= Cascajal =

- Ward
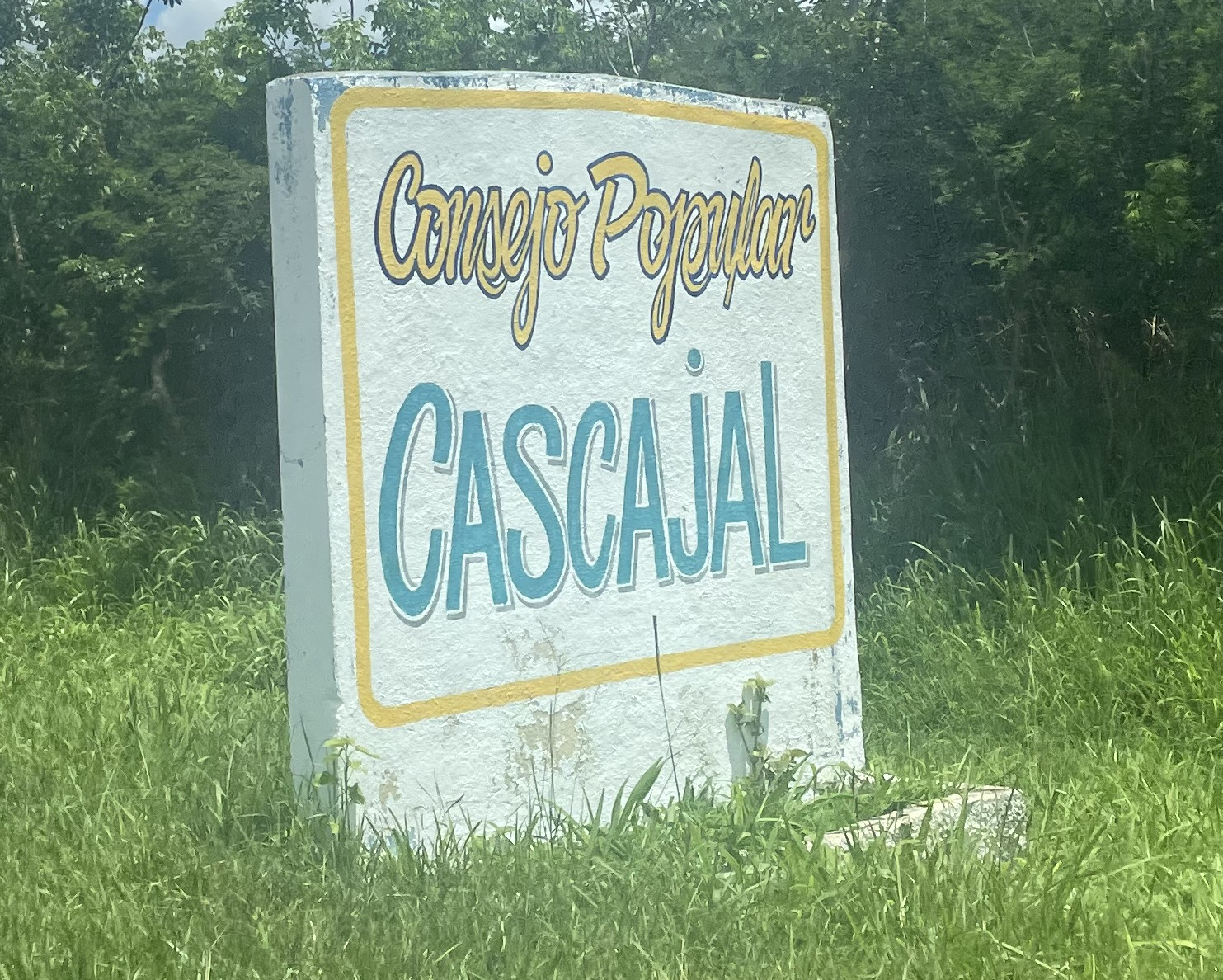
- sign of the Consejo popular of Cascajal

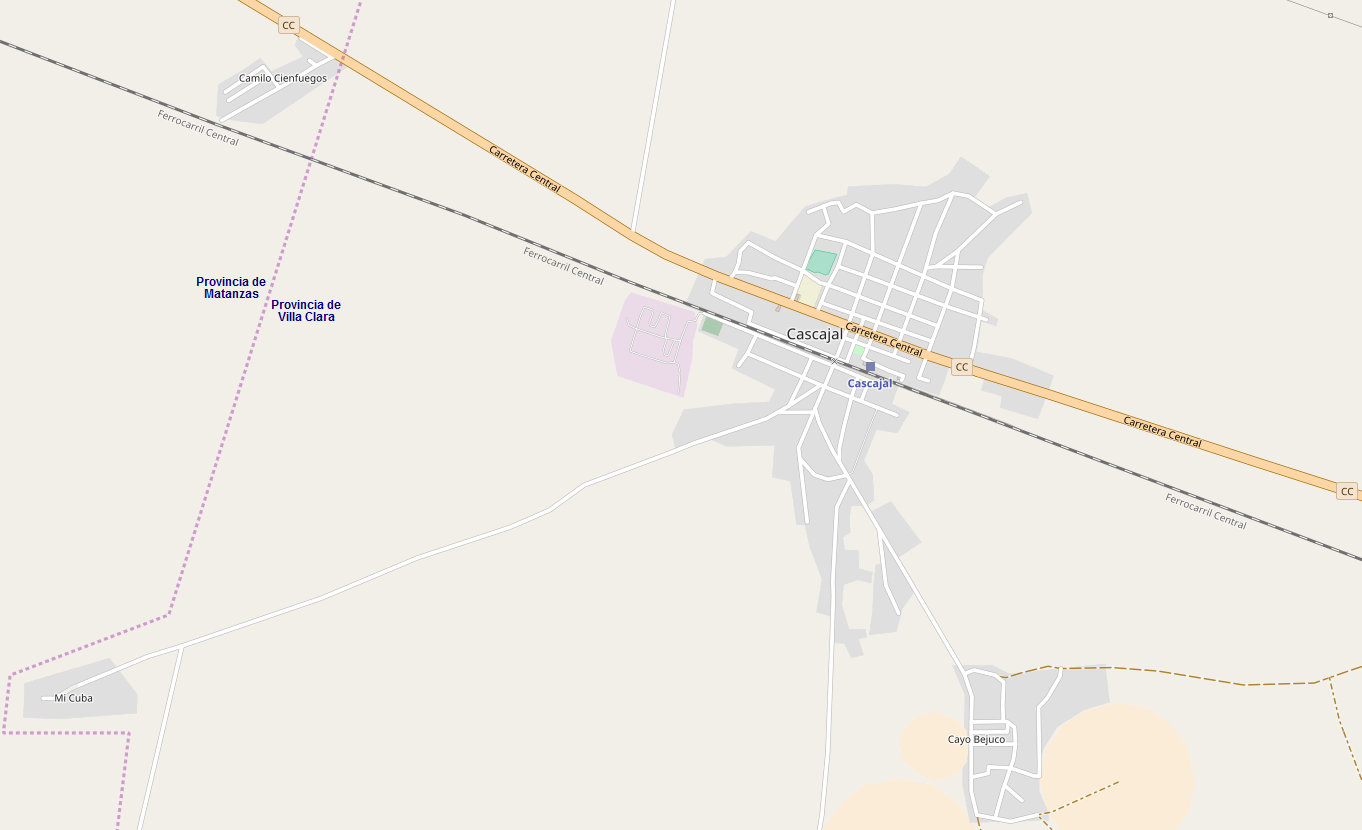
- OSM map showing Cascajal and the surrounding villages

- Location of Cascajal in Cuba
- Coordinates: 22°40′09.0″N 80°31′46.8″W
- Country: Cuba
- Province: Villa Clara
- Municipality: Santo Domingo
- Founded: 1847
- Elevation: 50 m (160 ft)

Population (2012)
  - Total: 5,915
- Time zone: UTC-5 (EST)
- Area code: +53-422

Cascajal is a Cuban village and consejo popular (ward) of the municipality of Santo Domingo, in Villa Clara Province. With a 2012 population of 5,915, it is the most populated municipal settlement after Santo Domingo.

== History ==
The village was founded in 1847, during the construction of the Central Railway (Ferrocarril Central), connecting Havana to Santiago de Cuba.

== Geography ==
Cascajal lies west of its province, at the borders with the municipality of Los Arabos, in Matanzas Province, between Mayabón (7 km west) and Mordazo (9 km east). Nearest villages are Cayo Bejuco, 1 km southeast of it, and the little localities of Camilo Cienfuegos, Orbeta (both in Los Arabos) and Mi Cuba.

The village is 21 km far from Los Arabos and Manacas, 32 from Santo Domingo, 40 from Colón, 71 from Santa Clara, 96 from Cárdenas and 126 from Matanzas.

== Transport ==
The village is crossed in the middle by the "Carretera Central" (CC) state highway, the longest one in the island. It counts a train station, served by regional trains, on the central Havana-Santa Clara-Camagüey-Santiago line.

== See also ==
- Municipalities of Cuba
- List of cities in Cuba
