= Popular council =

- Popular assembly
- Consejo popular
