= Colón, Cuba =

Colón
- Municipality
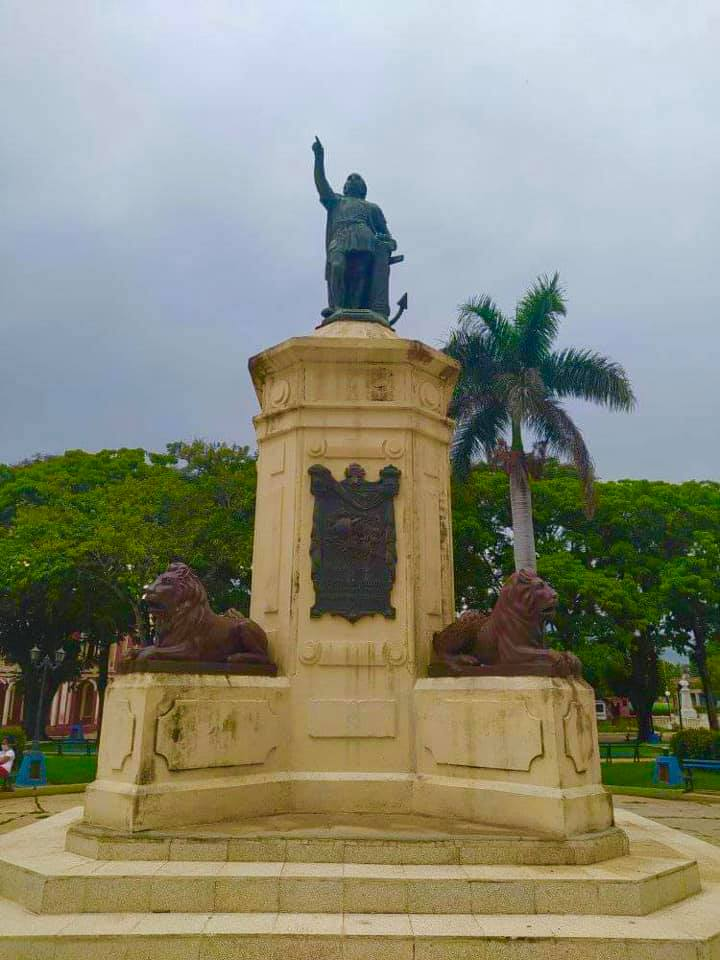
- Christopher Columbus statue in Colón, Matanzas

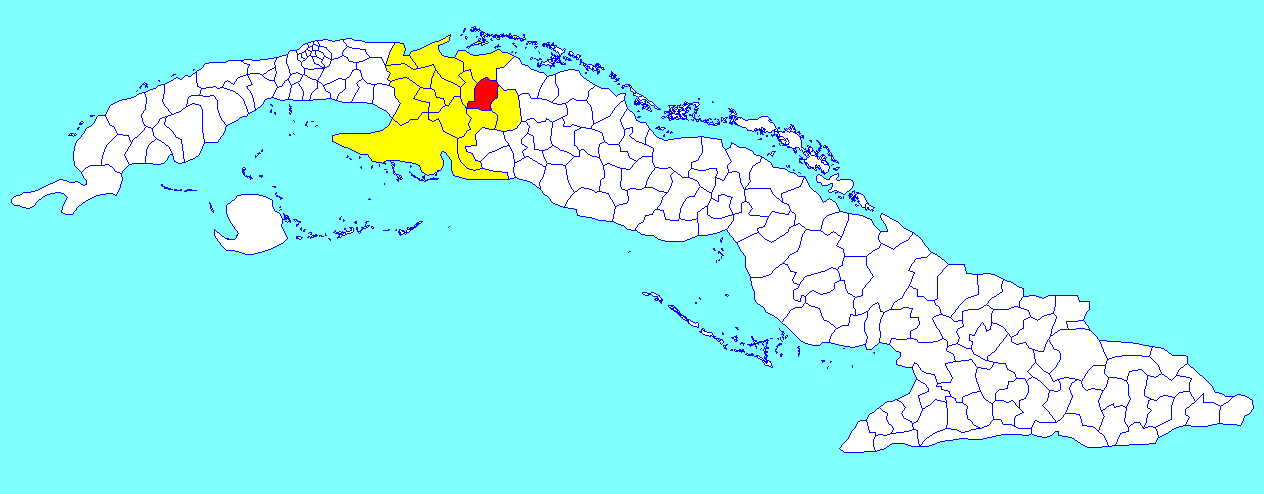
- Colón municipality (red) within Matanzas Province (yellow) and Cuba
- Coordinates: 22°43′21″N 80°54′24″W
- Country: Cuba
- Province: Matanzas
- Founded: 1846
- Established: 1859 (Villa)

Area
  - Total: 597 km^{2} (231 sq mi)
- Elevation: 60 m (200 ft)

Population (2022)
  - Total: 68,021
  - Density: 114/km^{2} (295/sq mi)
- Demonym: Colombino
- Time zone: UTC-5 (EST)

Colón is a municipality and city in the Matanzas Province of Cuba. The municipality has an area of 547 km^{2} (211 sq mi) and a population of about 68,021. The city proper, with a population of about 44,000, is the third-largest of its province.

== History ==
Colón was founded in 1836 under the name Nueva Bermeja. The deed to establish the town was signed in that year in the city of Matanzas. Don Martín José Zozaya founded the town in the former hacienda named La Bermeja. Don Martín set apart land at that time for a cemetery and a church.

The railroad arrived near the town in 1843 and reached it in 1851. In 1852, Fernando Diago, the owner of the sugar mill Ponina, inaugurated the first public school in the town. The town achieved the status of villa ('town') in 1859, named Colón, after the name of Christopher Columbus (Cristóbal Colón in Spanish).

Until the 1977 administrative reform, the municipality was divided into the campos of Agüica, Este, Guareiras, Jacán, Laguna Grande, Oeste and Palmillas.

== Geography ==
Colón borders the municipalities of Corralillo (in Villa Clara Province), Los Arabos, Calimete, Jagüey Grande, Perico and Martí. Its territory includes the villages of Agüica, Banaguises, Guareiras, La Panchita, México, René Fraga, Río Piedras, San José de los Ramos, Santa Gertrudis, Segio González and other minor rural localities.

== Demographics ==
In 2022, the municipality of Colón had a population of 68,021. With a total area of 597 km^{2} (231 sq mi), it has a population density of 110/km^{2} (280/sq mi).

== Architecture ==
The city of Colón since its founding has gone through different architectural styles, some of them on specific buildings and others that were emblematic in different stages, but which left a very strong imprint that identifies the villa. Styles range from Neoclassicism to balloon-frame construction, eclecticism, Art Nouveau, Art Deco, and Rationalism. Different styles of buildings can be seen along the streets. The peak of Neoclassicism can be admired in the Catholic church (founded on December 8, 1872) and the town hall. In the late 1880s, the atypical Quinta de Tirso Mesa was built, an irrefutable example of the introduction of balloon-frame construction and different cultural influences in the city's architecture. The building no longer exists, but has left a mark on the population and is still remembered for its beauty.

The introduction of Eclecticism to the city's architecture took place with the construction of the School of Arts and Crafts, built between October 16, 1911, and November 28, 1912, although it does not reject some Neoclassical aspects. In the same style are other buildings such as Ferrolana and Provincial Agricultural College (now Mario Muñoz Polytechnic Institute of Health). The period 1930–1959 was important to the city for two main reasons: the opening in 1930 of the section of the Carretera Central highway between Havana and Santa Clara, and the rise to mayor of José Manuel Gutiérrez Planes (1927–1933), under whose mandate several notable buildings appeared, such as the Hotel Nuevo Continental (1937), resulting in a new architectural style in the city, Art Deco, with the Teatro Canal as its finest example. Between 1948 and 1959, Rationalism made its entrance in the city, and the best examples can be seen in the Santiago-Havana and Gran Caridad hotels.

== Economy ==
Colón's economy is centered around agriculture (sugarcane, tobacco, citrus fruit, honey), industry (spaghetti factory), and livestock raising. It is also an important railway center.

== Gallery ==
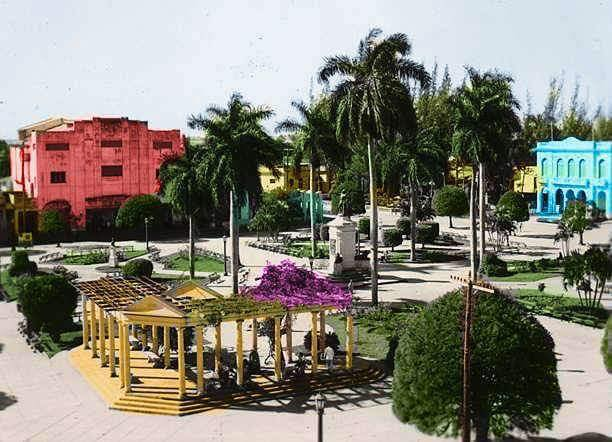
Colón Liberty Park, founded in 1892

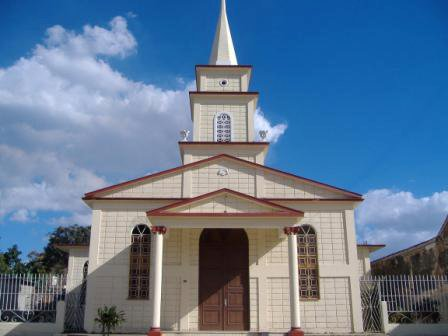
Iglesia Bautista de Colón

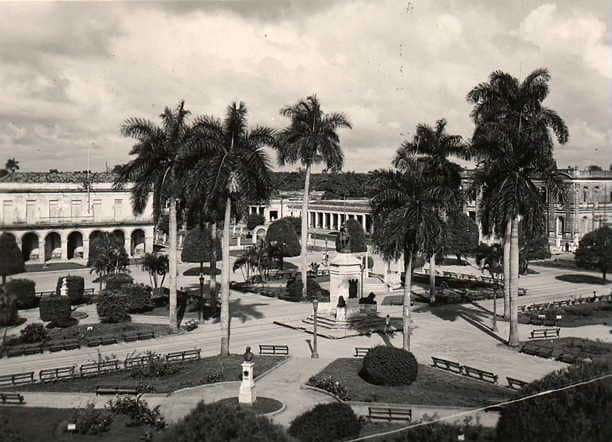
Liberty Park, circa 1940

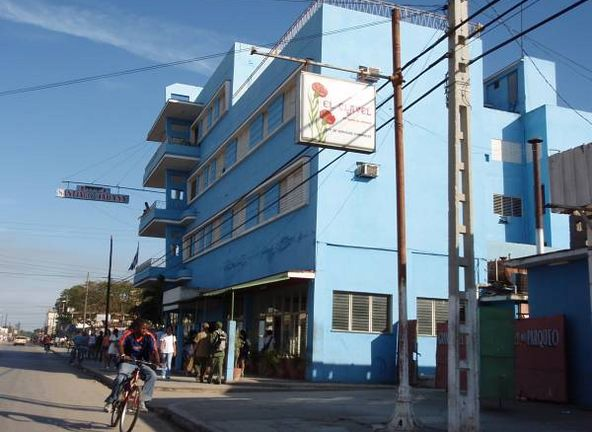
Santiago-Havana Hotel

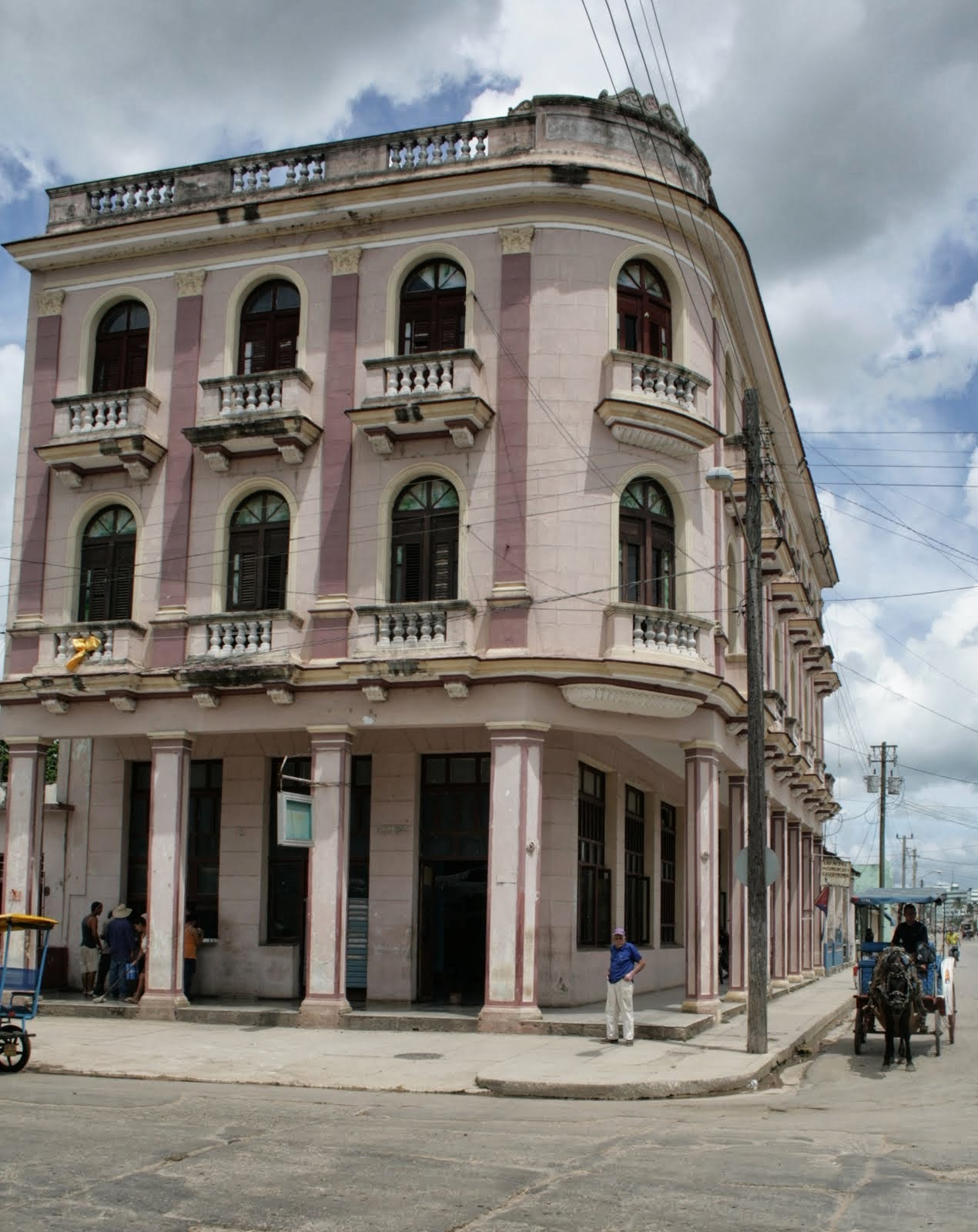
Hotel Nuevo Continental, European-style building

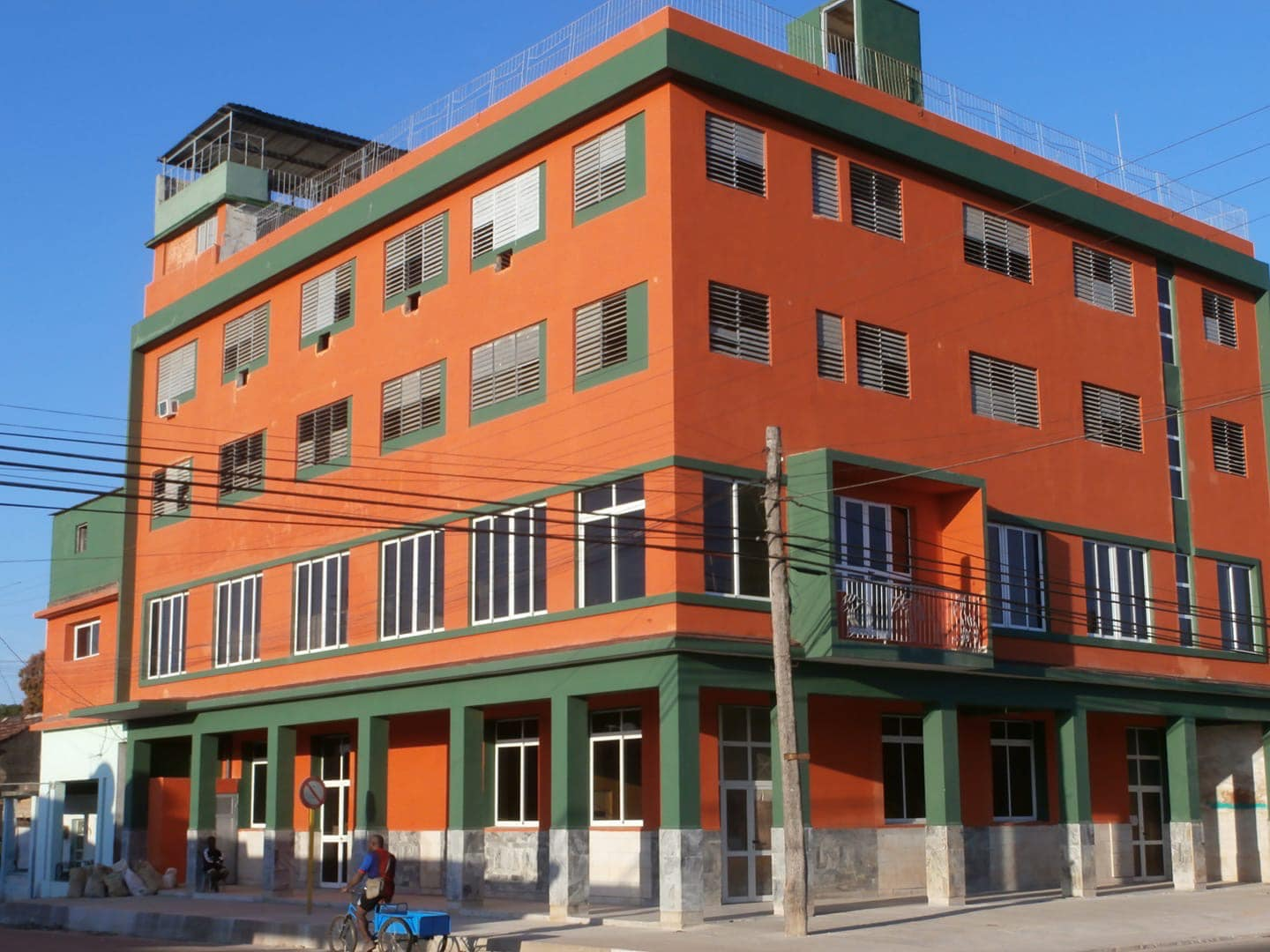
Caridad Hotel

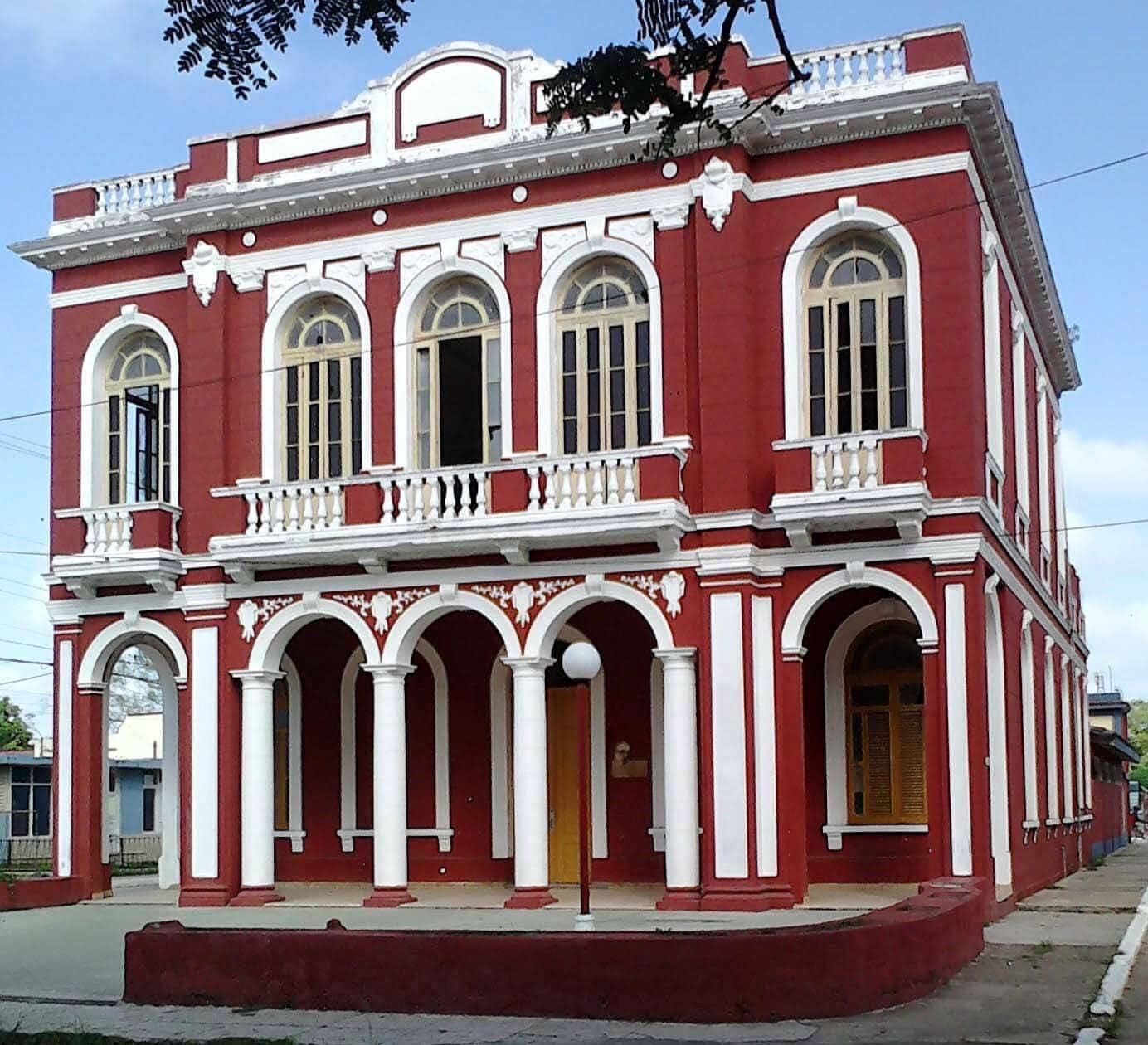
Cuban Lyceum on Ricardo Trujillo Street. Founded in 1926.

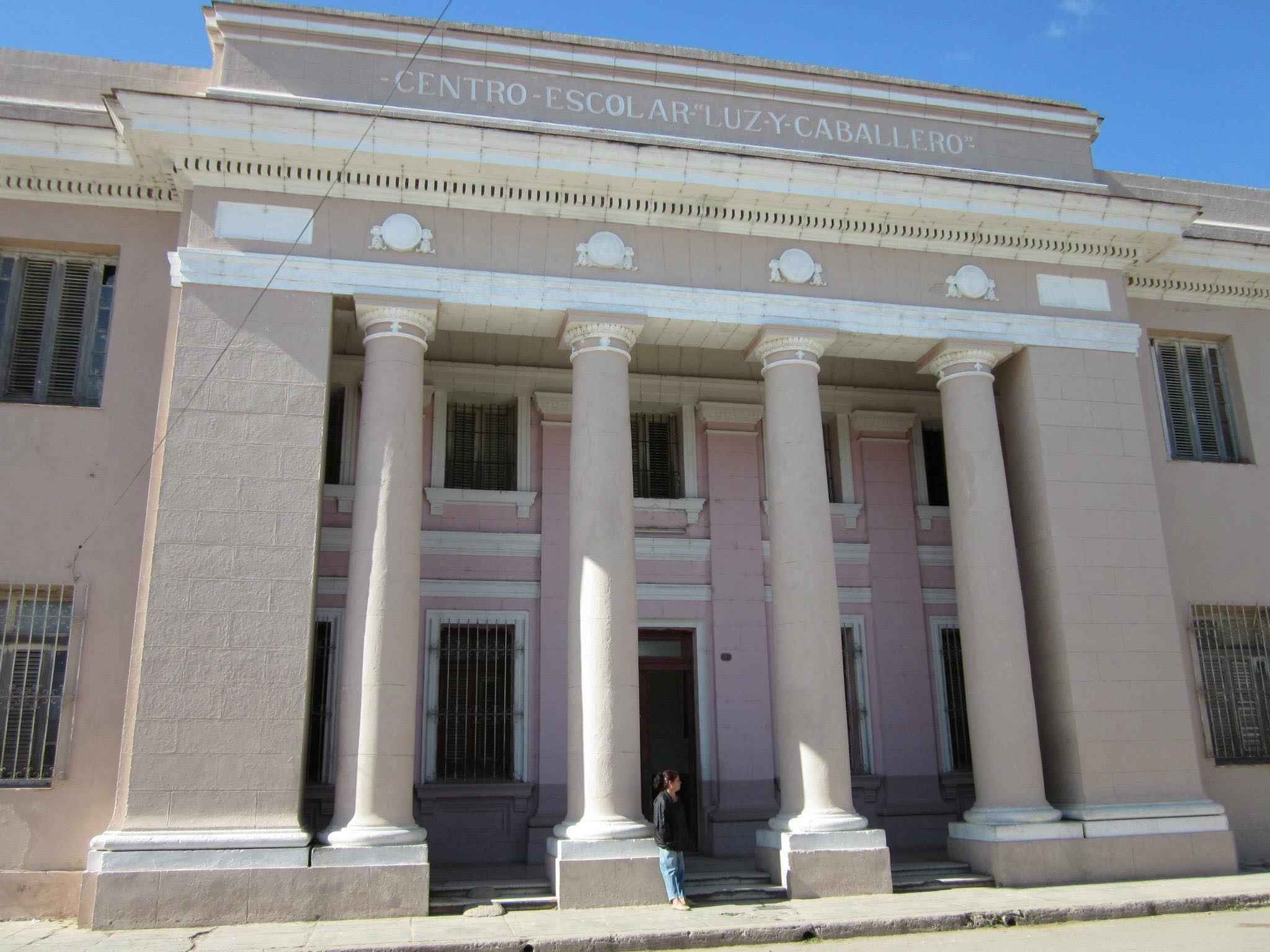
Escuela Luz y Caballero in Calixto García

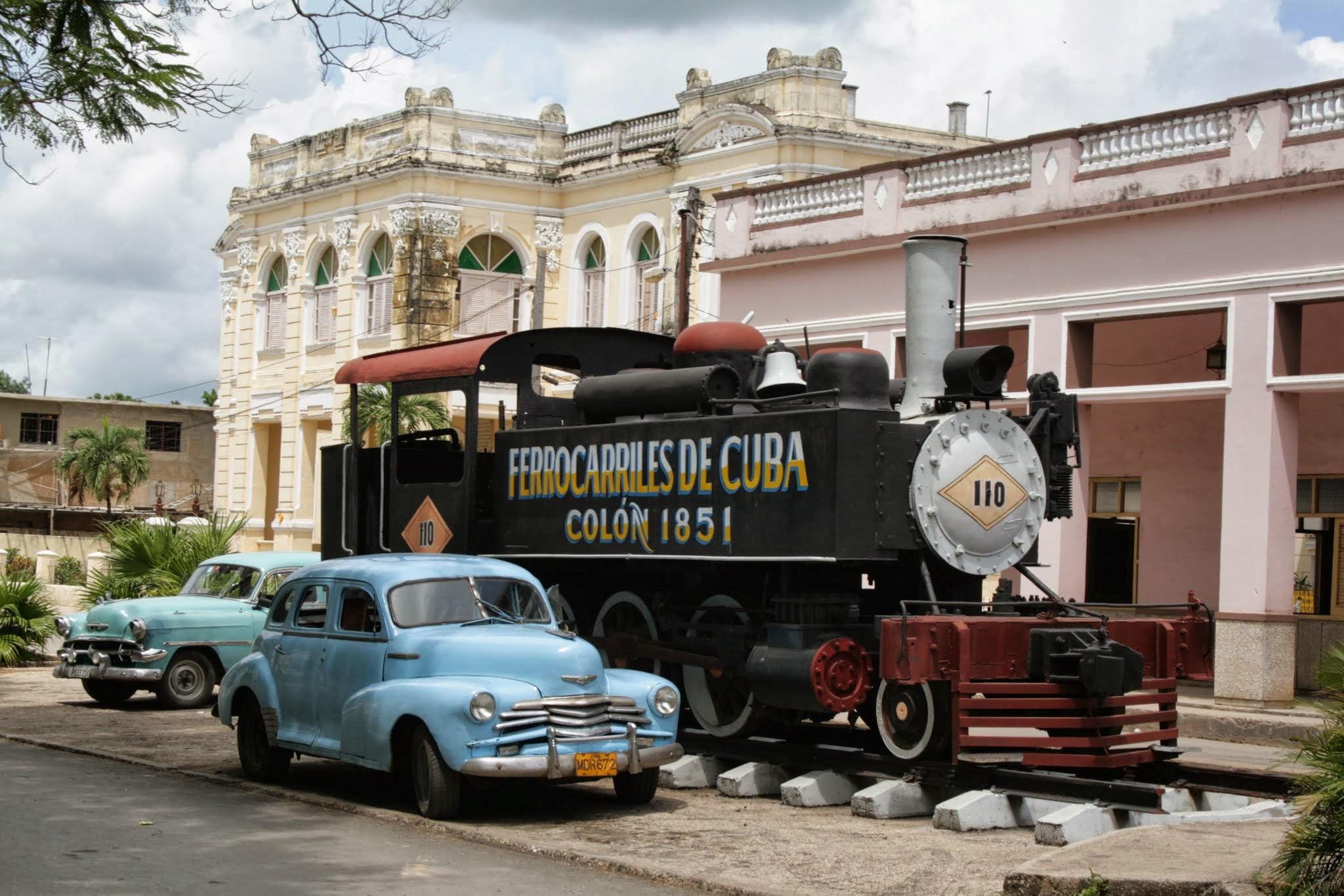
Colón train display model at Gonzalo de Quesada Street

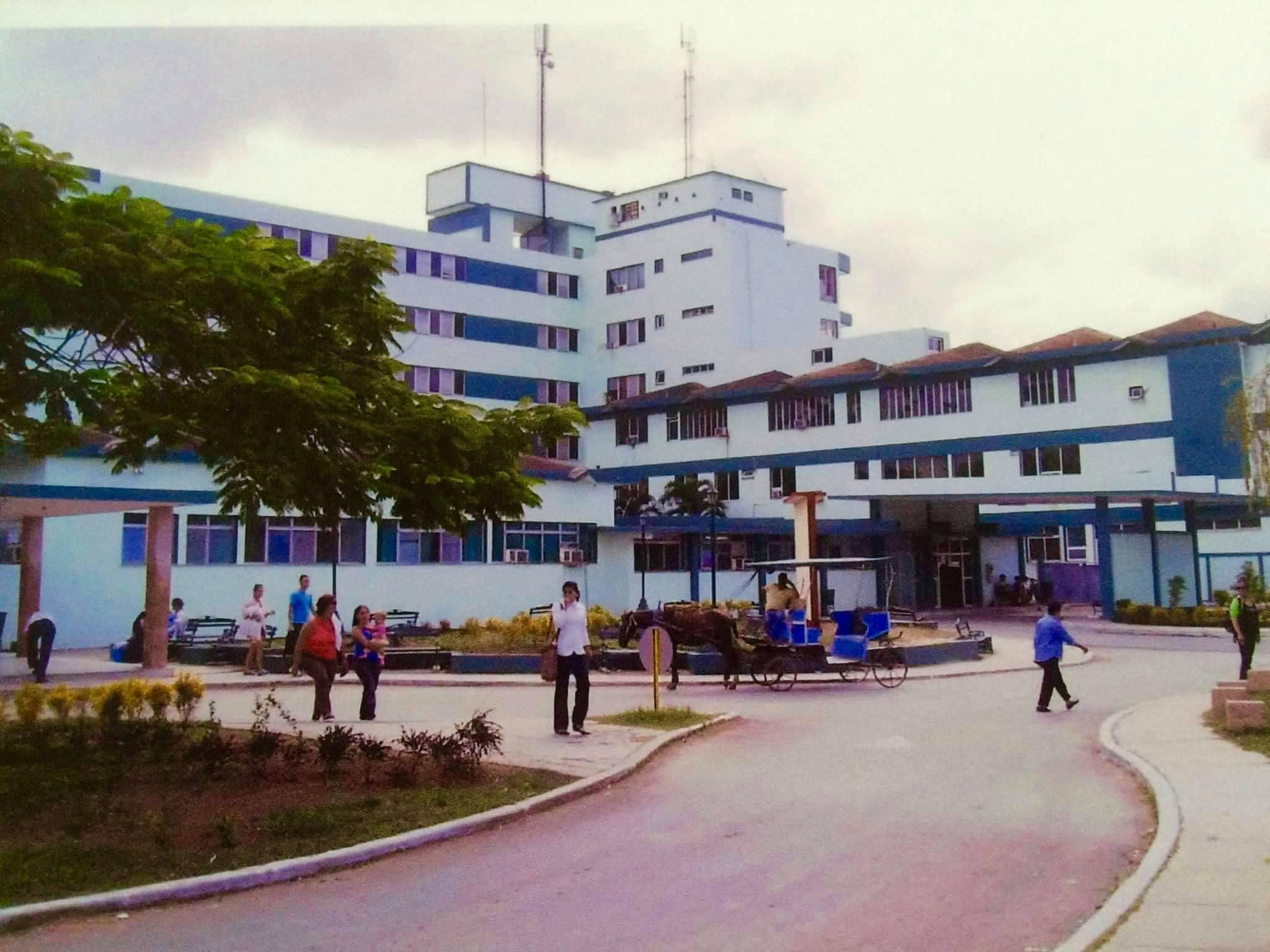
Hospital Docente Regional Mario Muñoz

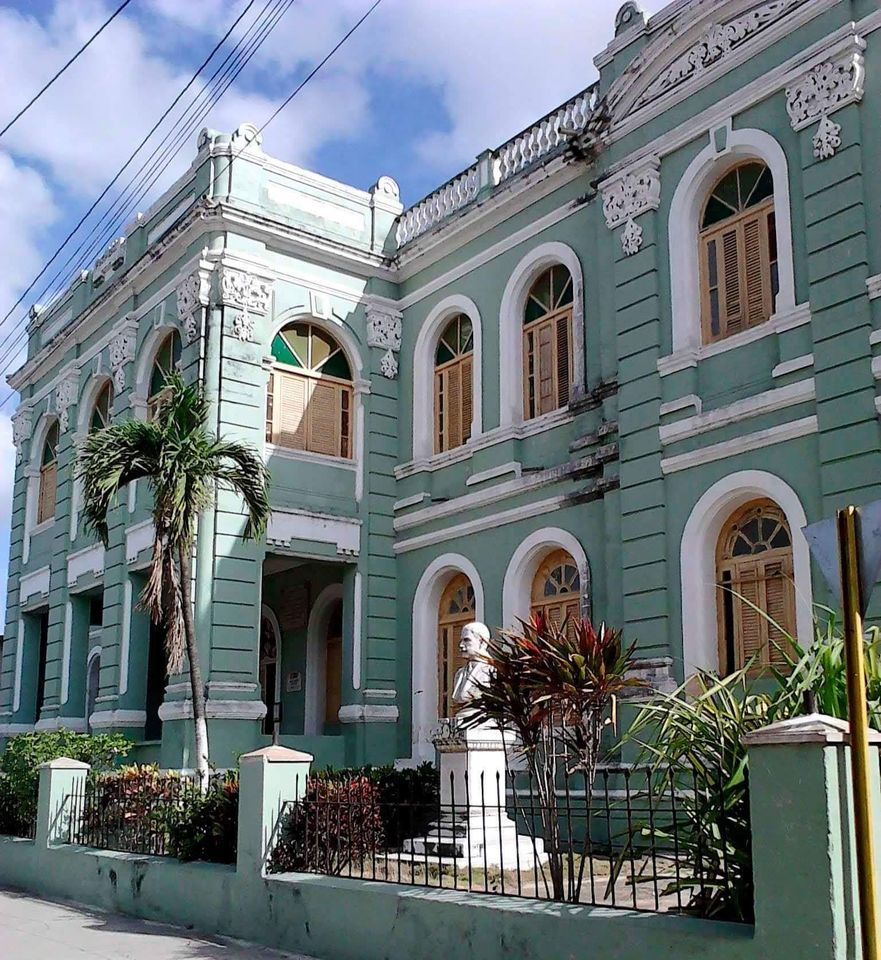
School of Arts and Trade on Gonzalo de Quesada Street

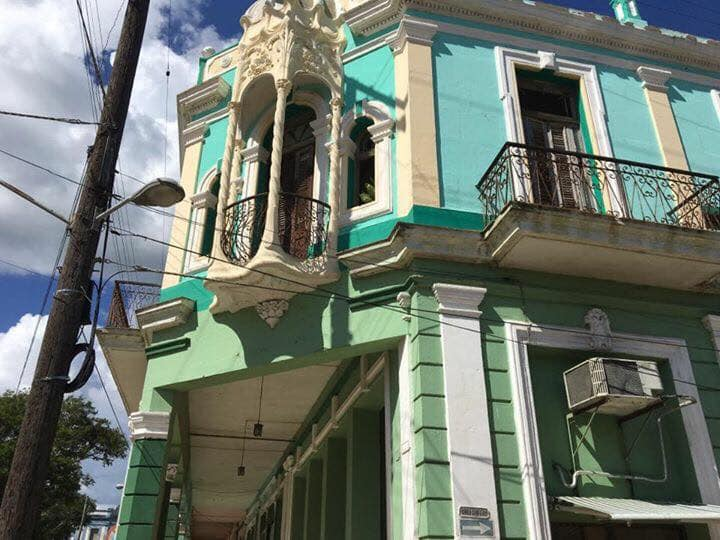
Areces Bank on Real and Camilo Cienfuegos Street – Art Nouveau balcony

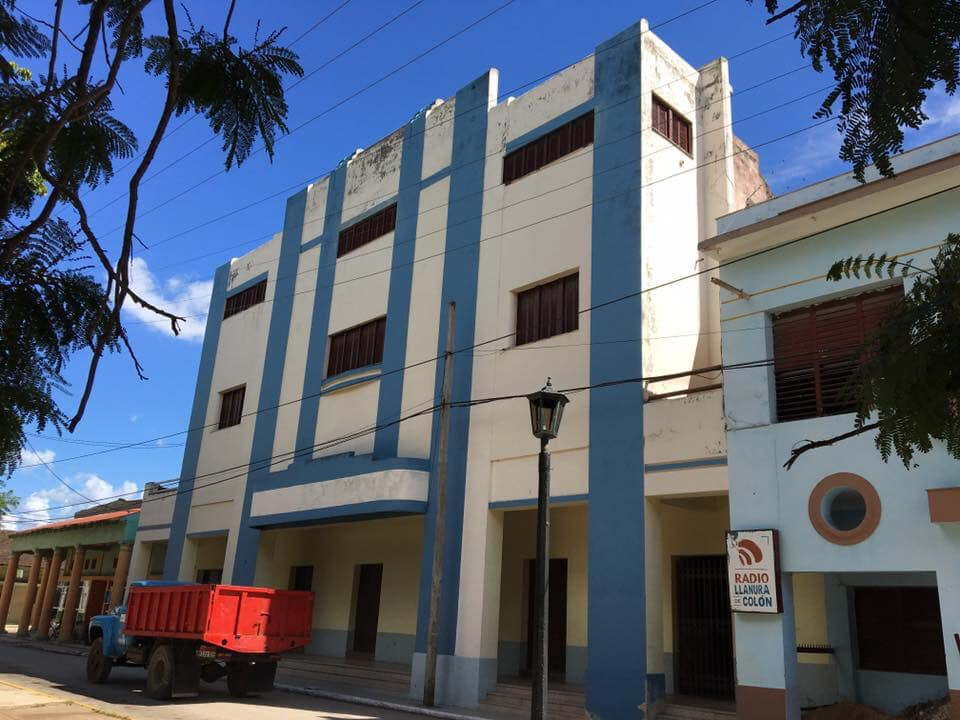
Canal Theatre

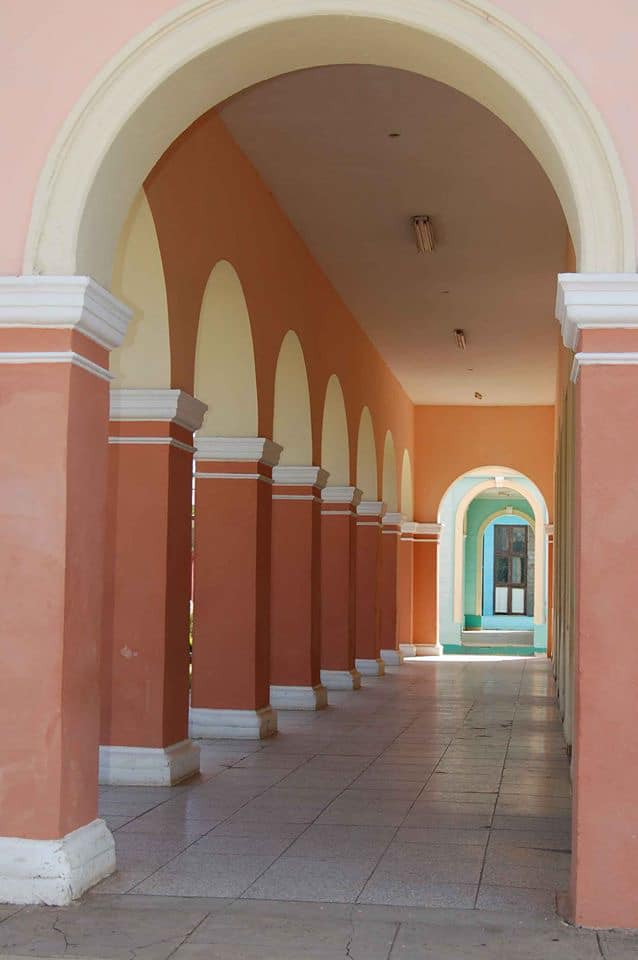
Municipal government building

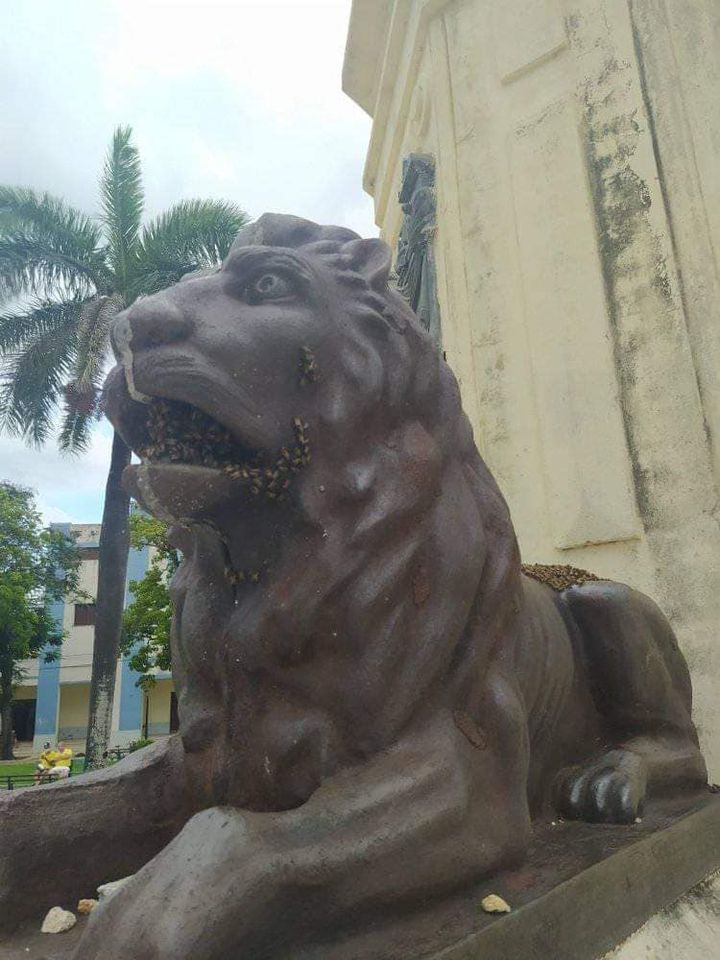
Bronze lion statue

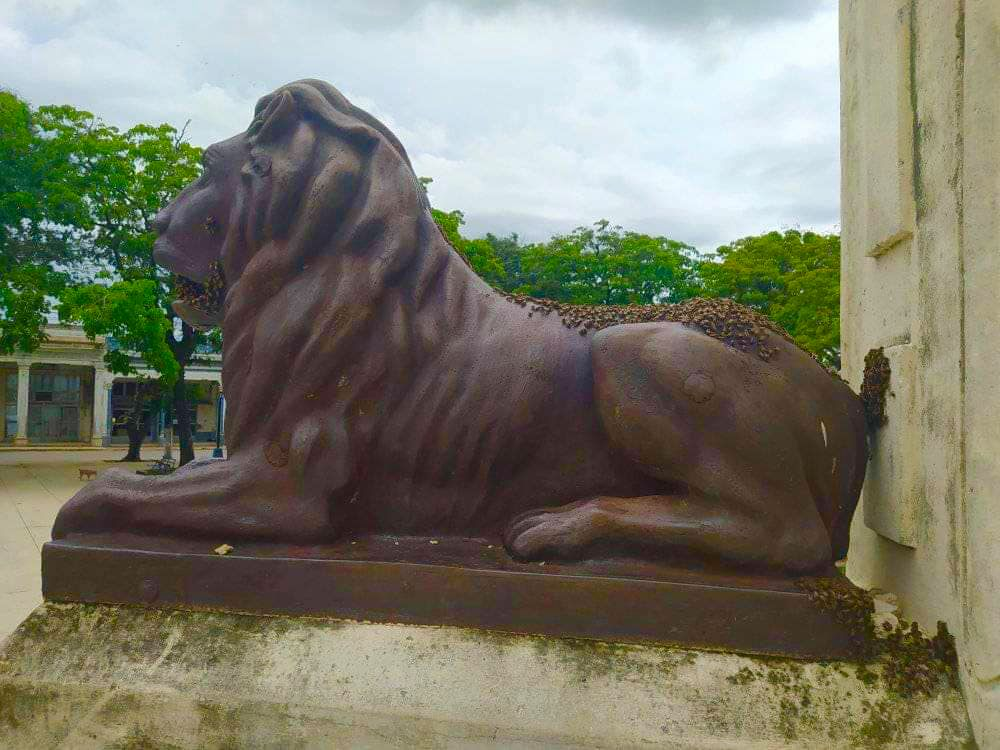
Bronze lion statue and part of Christopher Columbus monument

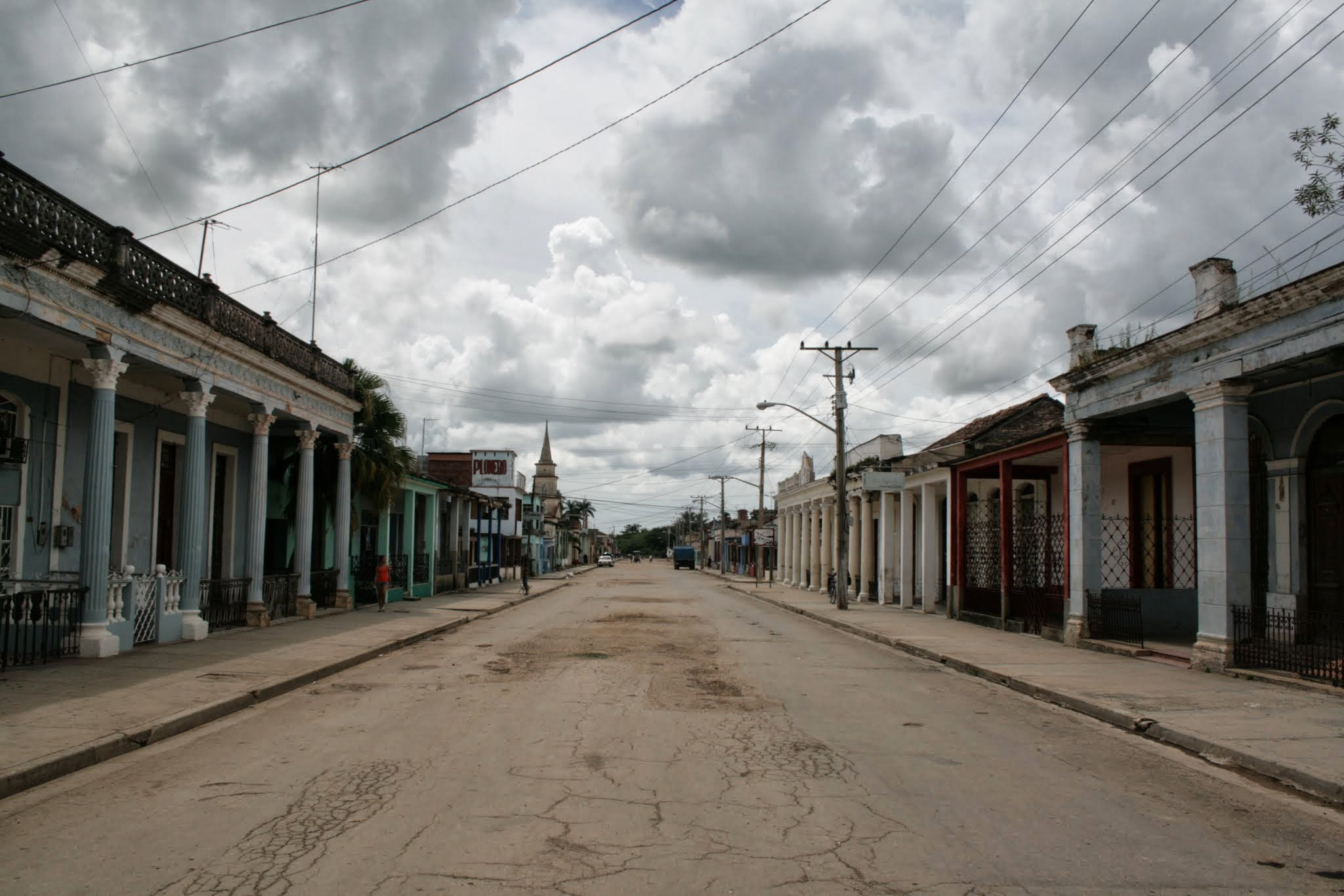
Diago Street

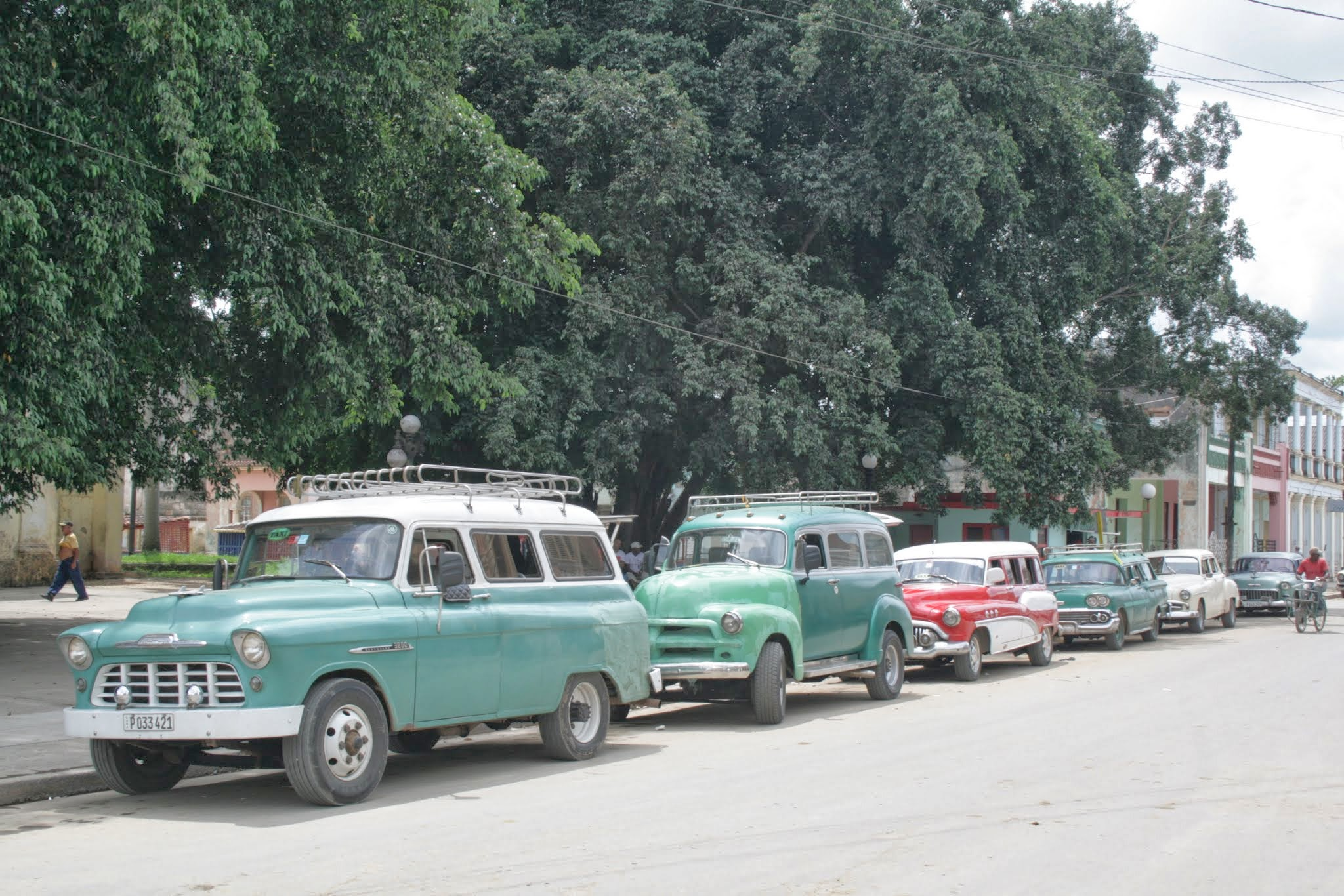
Classic automobiles in Colón

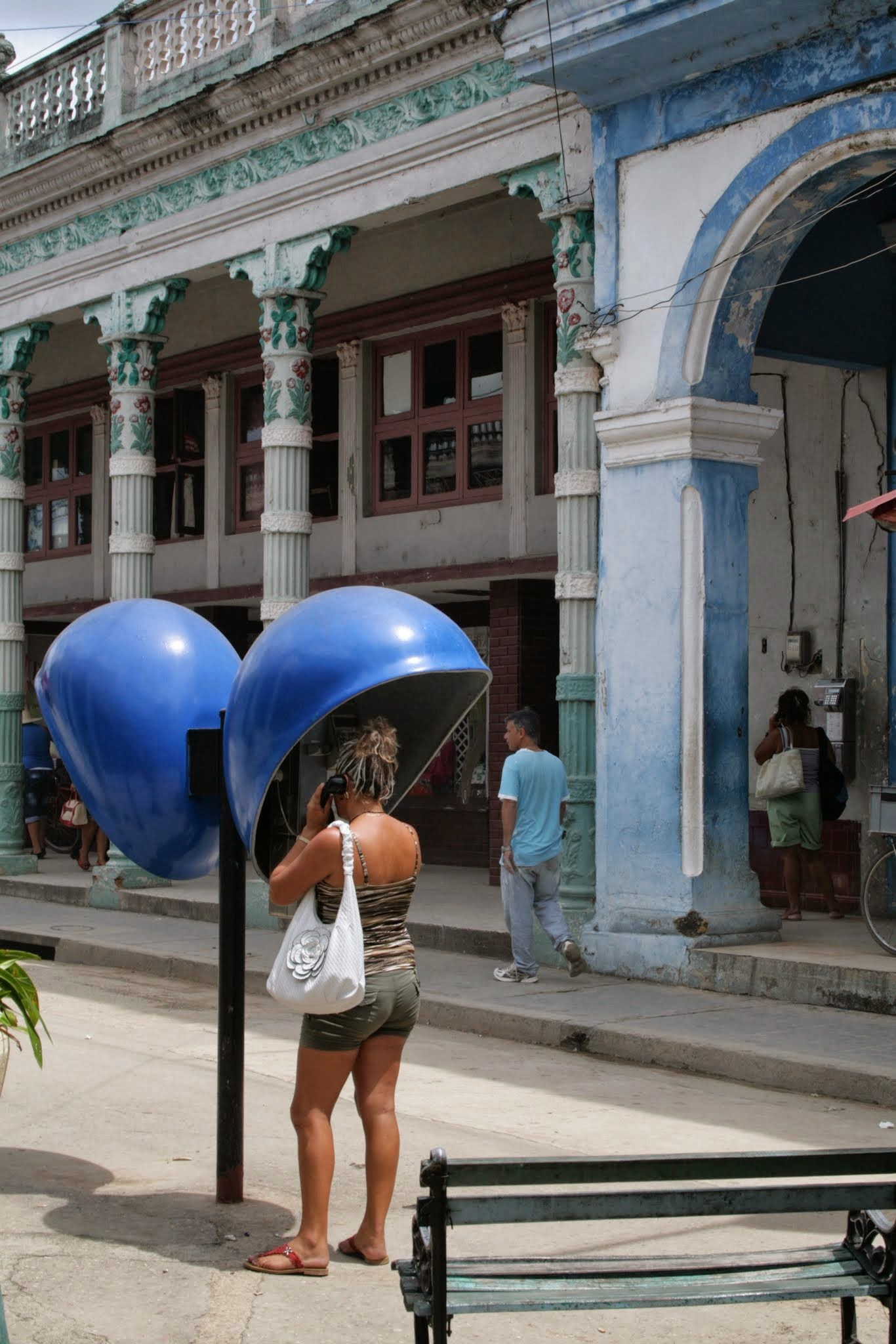
José Martí Street

== Notable people ==
- Paul Casanova (1941–2017), baseball player
- María Elena Cruz Varela (born 1953), poet and activist
- José Miguel Fernández (born 1988), baseball player
- Oscar Nunez (born 1958), Cuban-American actor and comedian
- Mario Quintero (1924–2017), basketball player
- Félix Ramos y Duarte (1848–1924), educator and writer

== See also ==
- Municipalities of Cuba
- List of cities in Cuba
