= George Washington, Cuba =

George Washington
- Consejo popular
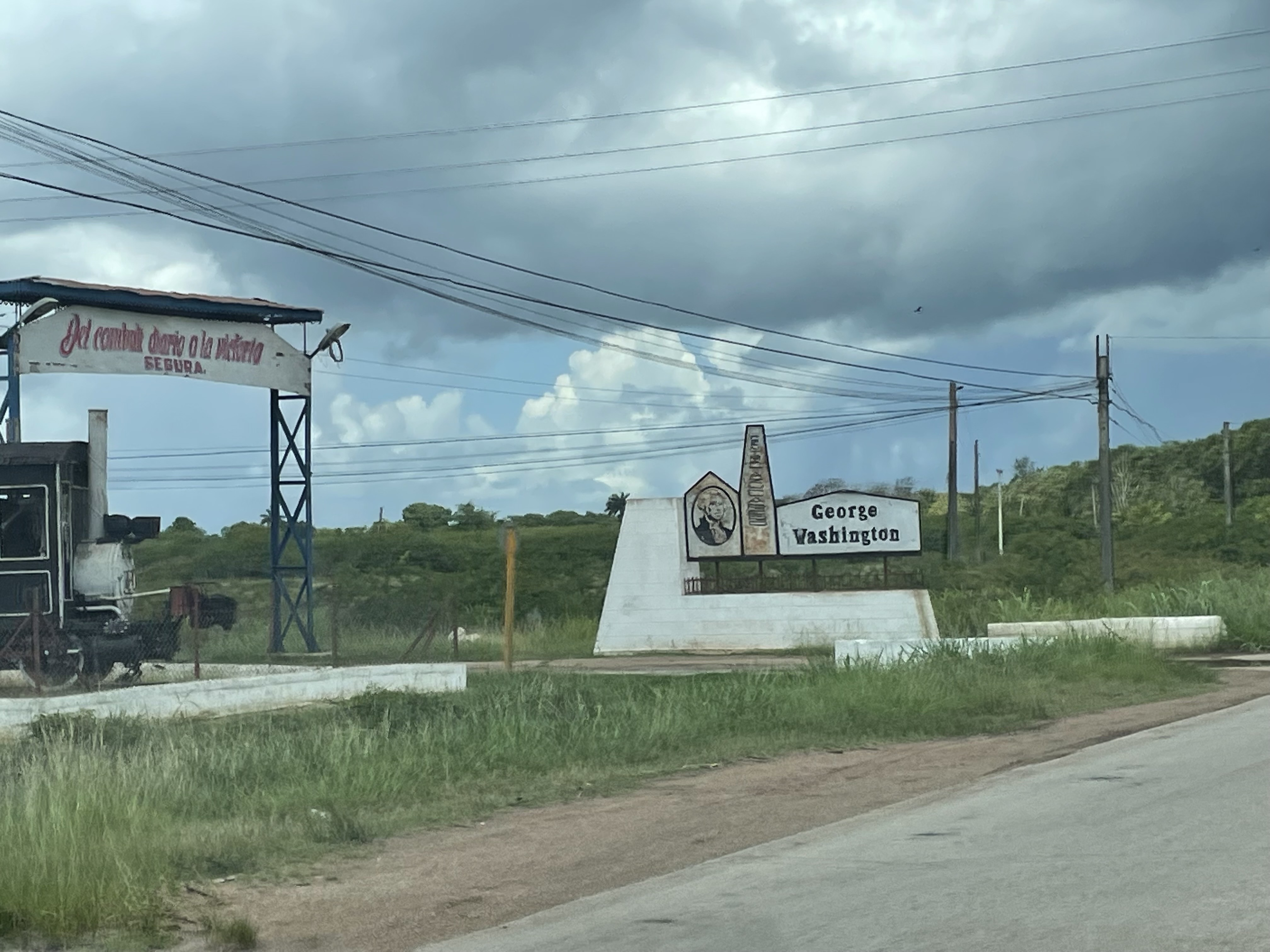
- The entrance to the sugar mill in George Washington, in 2023.

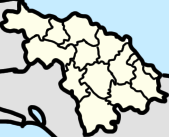
- Location within Cuba Location within Villa Clara Province
- Coordinates: 22°35′35.99″N 80°18′57.99″W
- Country: Cuba
- Province: Villa Clara
- Municipality: Santo Domingo

Population (2012)
  - Total: 2,023
- Time zone: UTC-5 (EST)
- Area code: +53-422

George Washington, also known as Washington, is a village and ward in Villa Clara Province, Cuba, located in the municipality of Santo Domingo. In 2012, it was inhabited by 2,023 people. It is located along the Carretera Central, directly to the east of Manacas, and to the west of the municipal seat of Santo Domingo, both located in the same municipality.

== Name ==
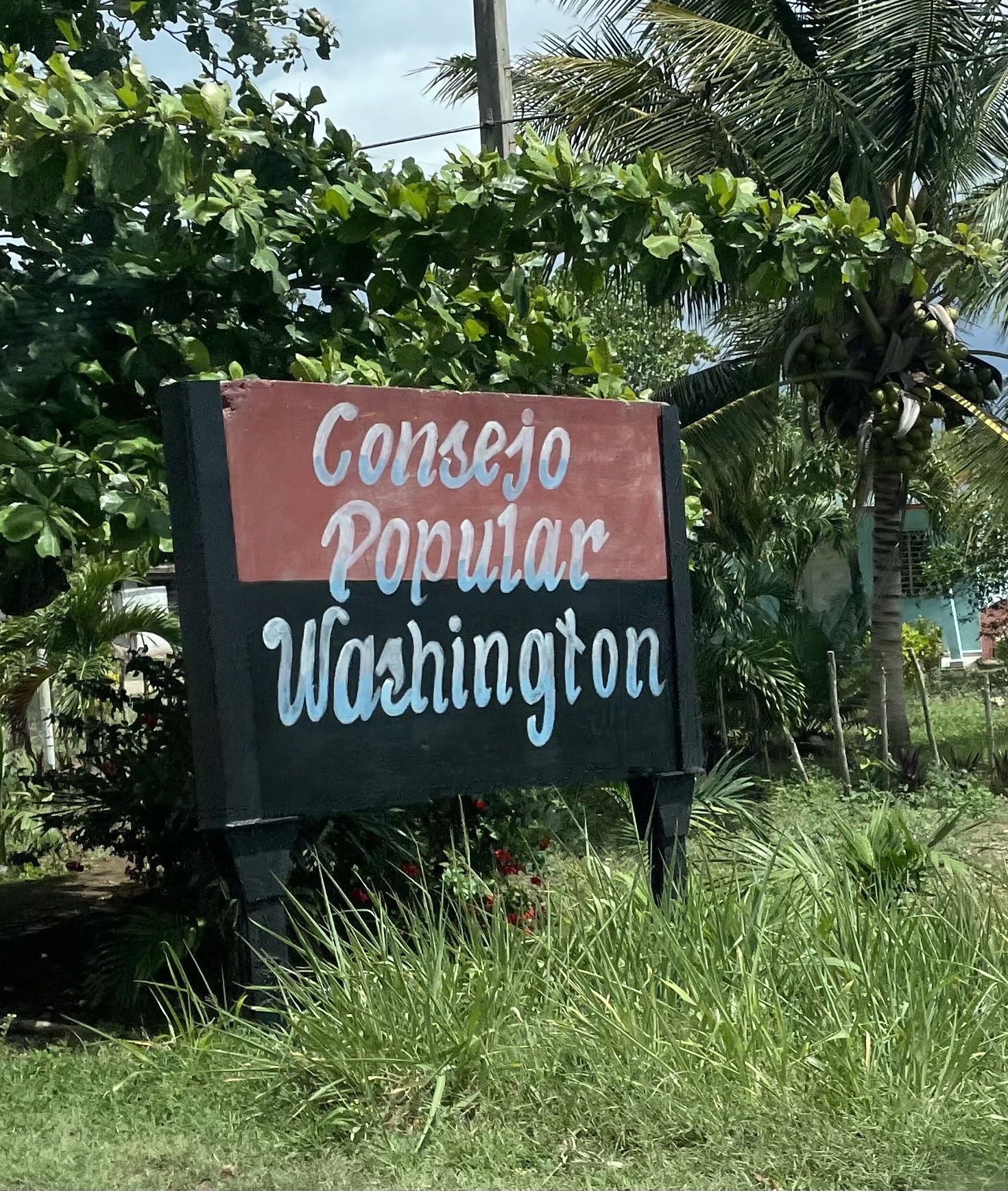
The sign at the entrance to George Washington, in 2023.

The village was named after George Washington, a Founding Father and first president of the United States. The official name of the ward is “Consejo Popular George Washington”.

== Geography ==
George Washington is one of ten wards (electoral subdivision) of the municipality of Santo Domingo.

== Economy ==
George Washington is one of local centres of tobacco and a sugarcane production.
