= Mario Quintero =

Cuban basketball player

Mario Cesar Quintero Padron
Personal information
- Born: January 10, 1924 San Luis, Cuba
- Died: January 26, 2017 (aged 92) Colón, Cuba
- Listed height: 5 ft 8 in (1.73 m)

Mario Cesar Quintero Padron (10 January 1924 – 26 January 2017) was a Cuban basketball player who competed in the 1948 Summer Olympics and in the 1952 Summer Olympics.

== Career ==
Quintero coached the national team at the 1959 Pan American Games and 1967 Pan American Games, as well as qualified for the 1968 Summer Olympics. He became an international referee in 1953.

Quintero died in Colón on 26 January 2017.
