= Los Arabos =

- Municipality
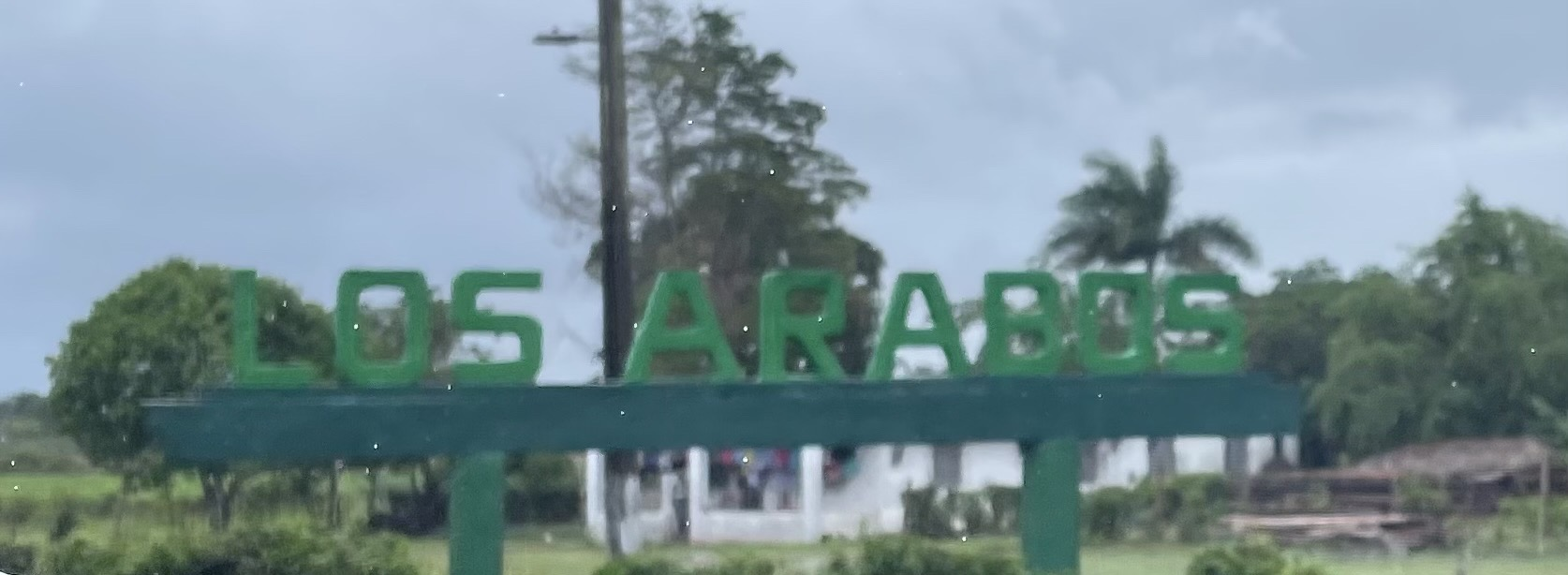
- Sign seen when entering the municipality from Santo Domingo

- Coat of arms

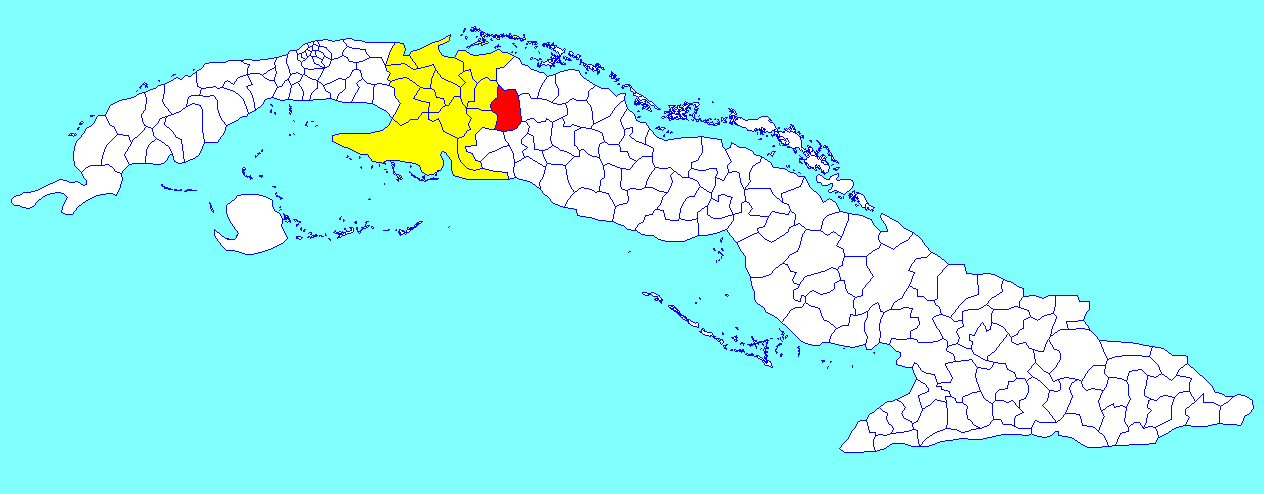
- Los Arabos municipality (red) within Matanzas Province (yellow) and Cuba
- Coordinates: 22°44′24″N 80°42′58″W
- Country: Cuba
- Province: Matanzas
- Established: 1876

Area
  - Total: 762 km^{2} (294 sq mi)
- Elevation: 75 m (246 ft)

Population (2022)
  - Total: 23,111
  - Density: 30.3/km^{2} (78.6/sq mi)
- Time zone: UTC-5 (EST)
- Area code: +53-52

Los Arabos is a municipality and town in the Matanzas Province of Cuba. It is located in the eastern part of the province, bordering the province of Villa Clara.

== History ==
The municipality was divided into the barrios of Cabecera (municipal seat), Macagua, Monte Alto and San Pedro de Mayabón.

== Demographics ==
In 2022, the municipality of Los Arabos had a population of 25,702. With a total area of 762 km^{2} (294 sq mi), it has a population density of 30/km^{2} (78/sq mi).

== See also ==
- Municipalities of Cuba
- List of cities in Cuba
