= San José de los Ramos =

- Village
- Location of San José de los Ramos in Cuba
- Coordinates: 22°48′00″N 80°46′00″W
- Country: Cuba
- Province: Matanzas
- Municipality: Colón
- Elevation: 60 m (200 ft)

Population (2011)
  - Total: 5,746
- Time zone: UTC-5 (EST)
- Area code: +53-52

San José de los Ramos is a former town in the east of the Cuban province of Matanzas. It now forms part of Colón, Cuba. It is located some 17 km (11 mi) to the north east of the centre of Colón and 189 km (117 mi) east of Havana. The municipal district measured 56 square miles (150 km^{2}) and had a population of 9,206 in 1943.

== History ==
San José de los Ramos was founded in 1844 when the first houses were built near the Júcaro railway. At the centre was the church or chapel of the same name. The original name of the community was Cunagua, a native word which is now one of the neighbourhoods. In 1527, it was sold to Andrés Recio and took the name Las Ciegas (The Blind Women) before becoming San José de los Ramos. In 1879, San José became a municipality (ayuntamiento). In 1902, it was annexed to Colón but was separated again in 1910. In 1940, it became an integral part of the judicial and fiscal district of Colón. In 1943, it consisted of the districts of Banagüises (also Managüises) with a population of 4,103, Cunagua, population 1,187, and San José de los Ramos, population 3,916. In the War of Independence, more than a hundred of its citizens took up arms against Spain.

== Geography ==
The community lies on flat land extending from Colón. It is watered by the rivers Palmillias, Piedras, Las Ciegas and Jigüe. The La Palma River which enjoys considerable flow is fed by three streams, the first from the Lake of Banagüises, the second, known as the Piedra River originating in the Nueva Bermeja and Palmillas and fed by the Jigüe, Macagosa and other streams, and the third the creek of Potrerillo. The La Palmas River flows 65 km (40 mi) from San José de los Ramos to its mouth in the Bay of Santa Clara. It can be navigated up to the landing stage known as La Palma.

== Economy ==
In 1957, the community consisted of 534 farms covering 22% of its territory or (4,300 ha (11,000 acres). The main crop was sugar cane, some fruit being grown for local consumption. In 1952, there were 10,700 head of cattle. The soil is rich in limestone and clay which is used for the manufacture of pottery and bricks.

== Famous citizen ==
Félix Ramos y Duarte (1848–1924), a philologist and educator, remembered above all for his Diccionario de mejicanismos (Dictionary of Mexican Spanish), was born in San José de Los Ramos.

== Bibliography ==
- Gannett, Henry (1902). A Gazetteer of Cuba (Public domain ed.). U.S. Government Printing Office. p. 96.
