= Antón Díaz =

- Ward
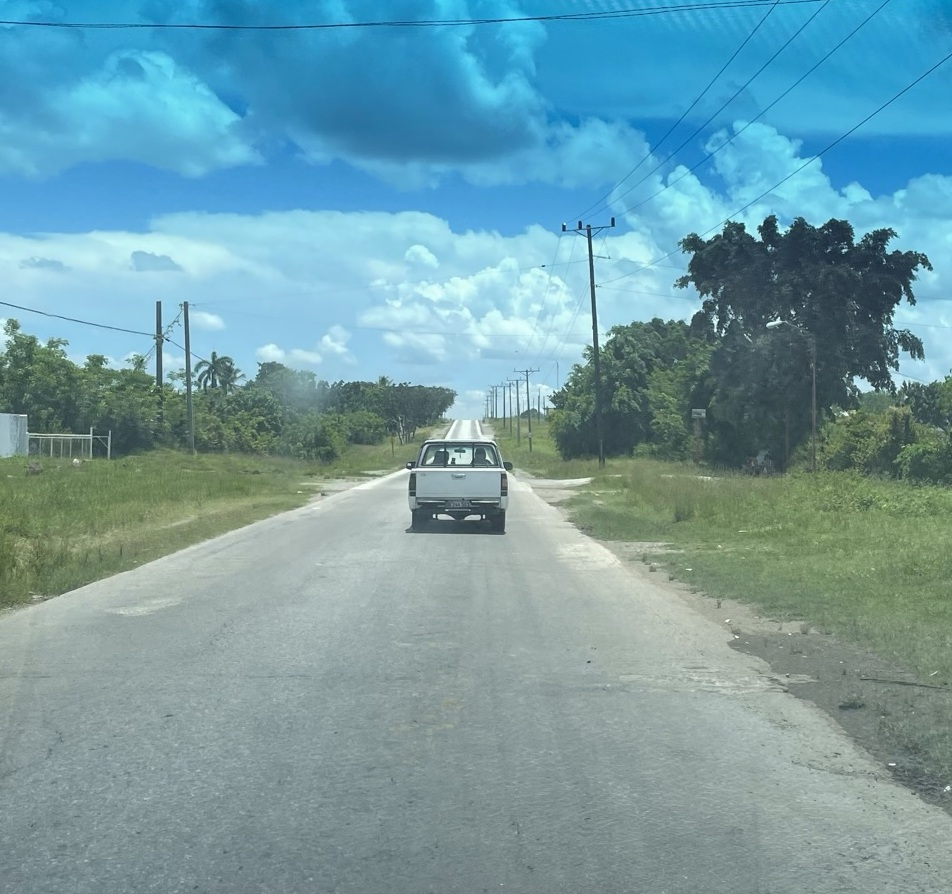
- the Carretera Central passing through the ward of Anton Diaz

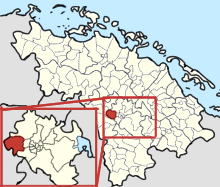
- Anton Diaz in Villa Clara

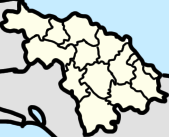
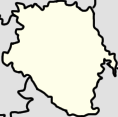
- Location within Cuba Location within Villa Clara Province Location within Santa Clara
- Coordinates: 22°24′45″N 80°02′22″W
- Country: Cuba
- Province: Villa Clara
- Municipality: Santa Clara

Area
  - Total: 34 km^{2} (13 sq mi)

Population
  - Total: 7,000 (approx.)
  - Density: 210/km^{2} (530/sq mi)

Antón Díaz is a ward (consejo popular) in Santa Clara, Cuba. It is located in the western part of Santa Clara.

== Geography ==
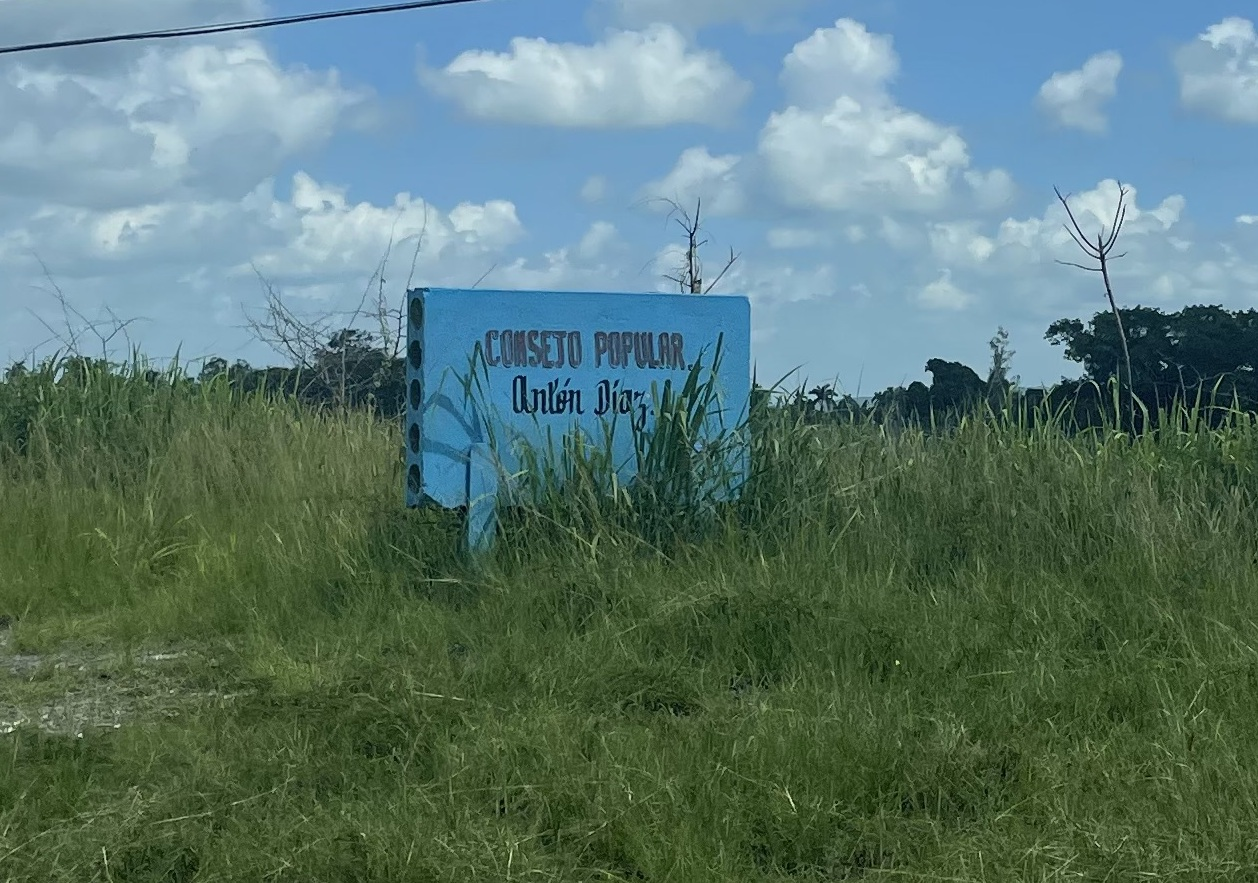
Ward (consejo popular) of Antón Díaz sign

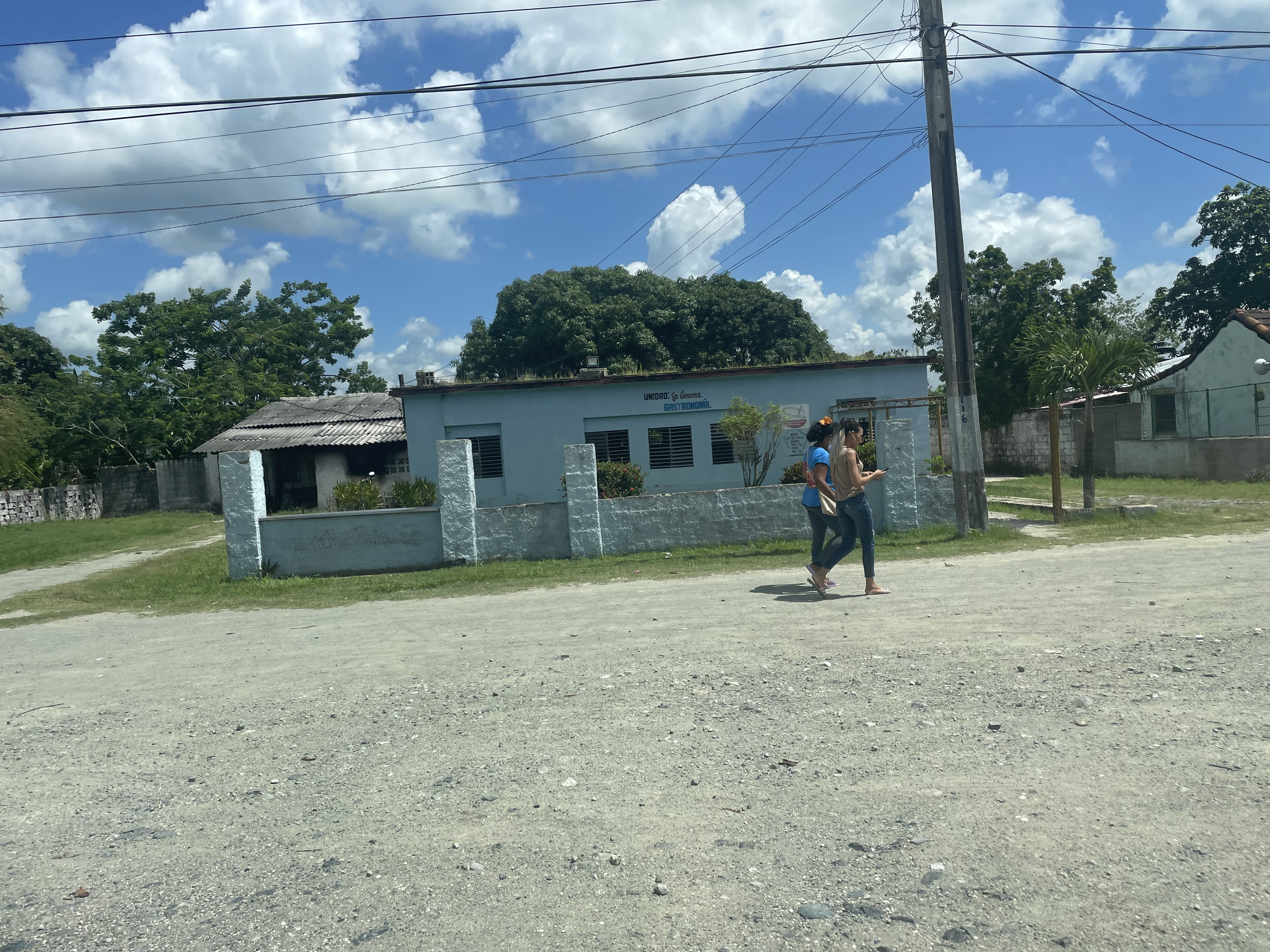
Building in La Gomera

Antón Díaz ward include the settlements of:

- Las Minas
- La Gomera
- La Pulga
- CCS "Rubén Martínez Villena"
