= Consejo popular =

Electoral ward of the National Assembly of People's Power of Cuba

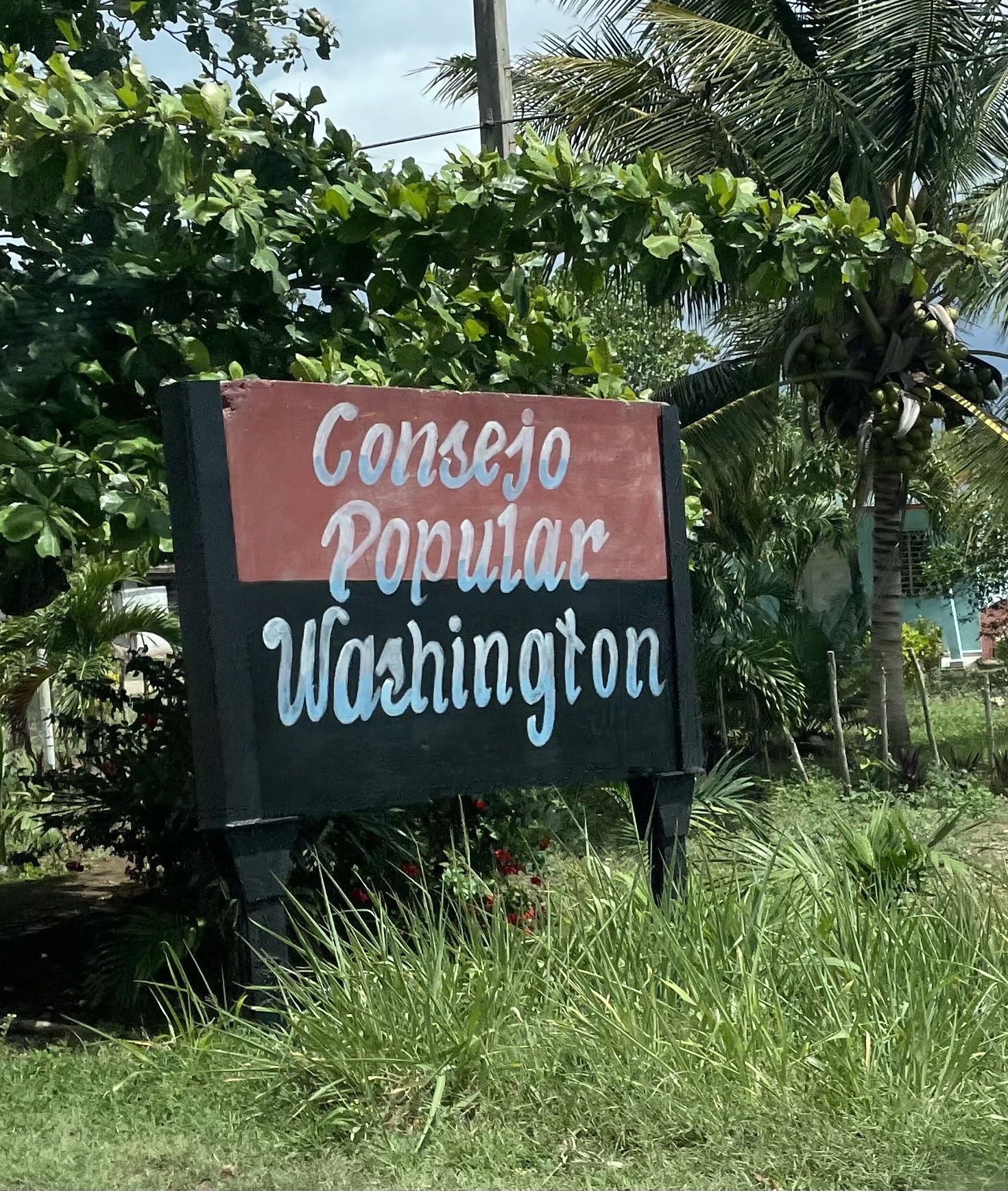
The consejo popular of George Washington, Cuba sign seen when entering the ward

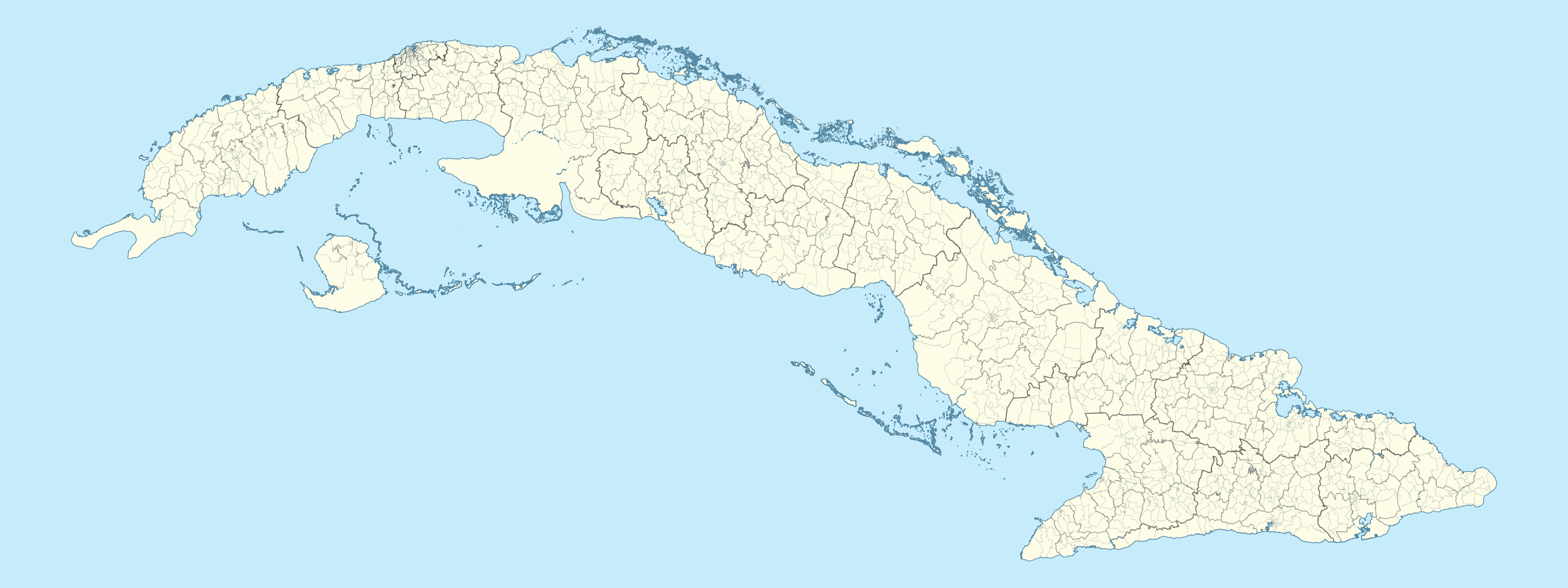
Map of consejos populares in Cuba

In Cuba, a consejo popular (Spanish pronunciation: [ˈkonsexo populaɾ]; lit. 'popular council' or 'people's council'; sometimes shortened to CP) is an electoral ward or political-administrative demarcation of the National Assembly of People's Power of Cuba.

They were created in 1988. 474 wards had been created as of 2023, with them changing frequently. They function as subdivisions, under municipalities.

Under the wards are districts. All wards have at least five districts, with urban areas having more and rural areas having less.

Most rural wards include one major town or village (usually with a population of 700-3,000 at least) with a few hamlets, while urban areas (usually municipal seat) are usually split into wards, named for the city with a I, II and sometimes III, and IV and so forth appended. Sometimes when only two wards are present in a city, they are split into "Norte" (or north) and "Sur" (or south).

== History ==
=== Barrios ===
Before the 1970s, instead of consejos populares, municipalities were divided into barrios. Some barrios did end up as consejos populares, but most did not. Instead of municipal seats of municipalities having consejos populares, only one barrio, which either adopted the name of the town, or named it centro (center) or cabecera (headtown).

== Constitution ==
The legal terms of a ward of Cuba as said in the Cuban Constitution:

=== Spanish ===
660: Sección Cuarta: Consejo Popular

661: Artículo 193. "El Consejo Popular es un órgano local del Poder Popular de carácter representativo, investido de la más alta autoridad para el desempeño de sus funciones y, sin constituir una instancia intermedia a los fines de la división político-administrativa, se organiza en ciudades, pueblos, barrios, poblados y zonas rurales, a partir de los delegados elegidos en las circunscripciones de su demarcación, los cuales deben elegir entre ellos quien lo presida."

662: "A las reuniones del Consejo Popular pueden invitarse, según los temas y asuntos a tratar, representantes de las organizaciones de masas y sociales, y de las entidades más importantes en la demarcación, con el objetivo principal de fortalecer la coordinación y el esfuerzo colectivo en beneficio de la comunidad, siempre desde las funciones propias que a cada cual corresponden."

663: Artículo 194. "El Consejo Popular representa a la población de la demarcación donde actúa y a la vez a la Asamblea Municipal del Poder Popular. Ejerce el control sobre las entidades de producción y servicios de incidencia local, y trabaja activamente para la satisfacción de las necesidades de la economía, de salud, asistenciales, educacionales, culturales, deportivas y recreativas, así como en las tareas de prevención y atención social, promoviendo la mayor participación de la población y las iniciativas locales para su consecución."

664: "La ley regula la organización y atribuciones del Consejo Popular."

=== English ===
660: Section Four: Popular Council

661: Article 193. "The Popular Council is a local body of the Popular Power of a representative nature, invested with the highest authority for the performance of its functions and, without constituting an intermediate instance for the purposes of the political-administrative division, it is organized in cities, towns, neighborhoods, towns and rural areas, from the delegates elected in the constituencies of their demarcation, who must choose among themselves who presides over it."

662: "Representatives of mass and social organizations, and of the most important entities in the demarcation, may be invited to the meetings of the Popular Council, with the main objective of strengthening coordination and collective effort for the benefit of the community, always from the proper functions that correspond to each one."

663: Article 194: "The Popular Council represents the population of the demarcation where it acts and at the same time the Municipal Assembly of Popular Power. Exercises control over production entities and local advocacy services, and works actively to meet the needs of the economy, health, care, education, culture, sports and recreation, as well as prevention and social care tasks, promoting the greater participation of the population and local initiatives for its achievement."

664: The law regulates the organization and powers of the Popular Council."

== Gallery ==
Signs/text in Cuba where it saids “Consejo Popular”

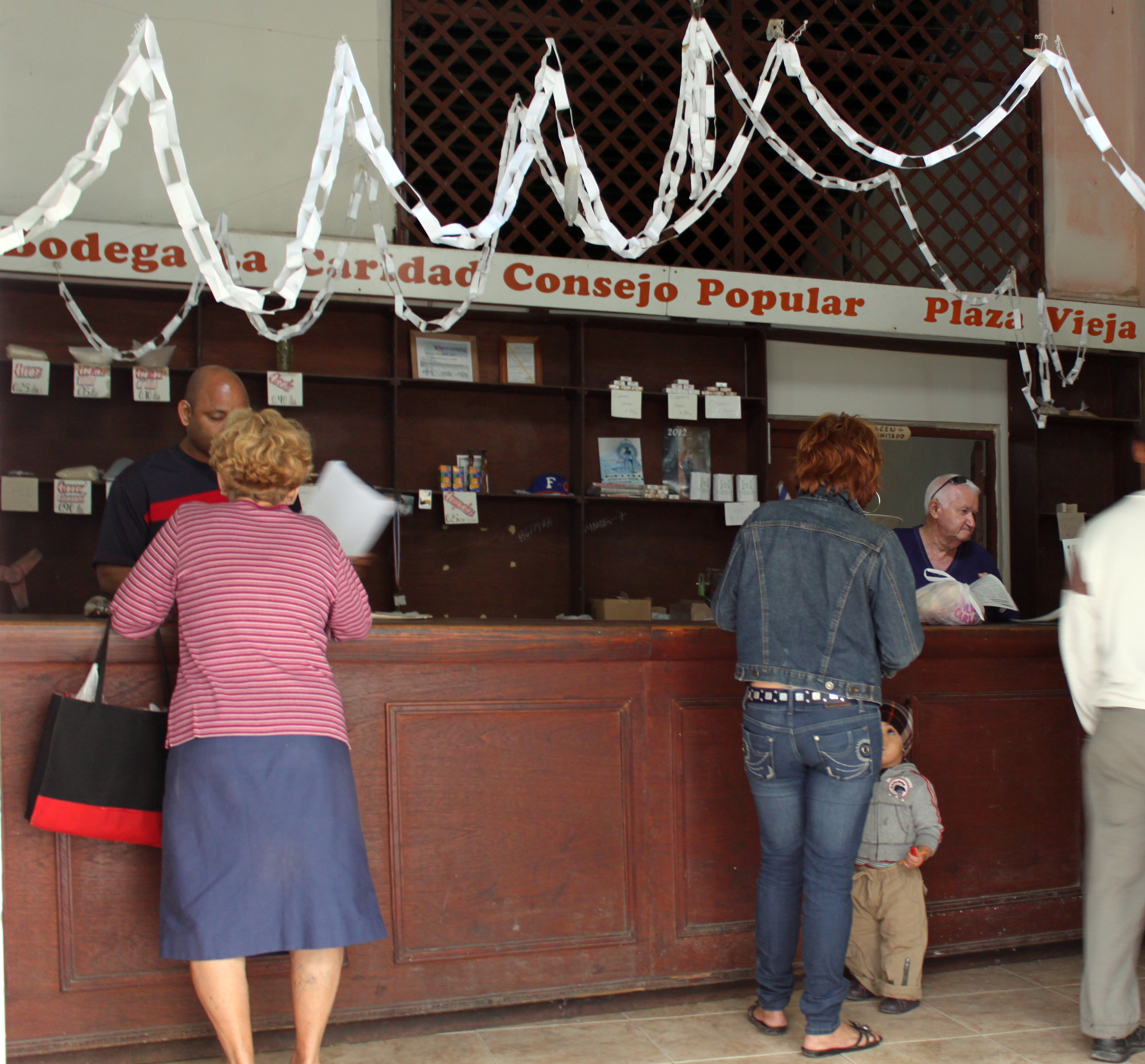
Plaza Vieja, Plaza de la Revolución, La Habana Province

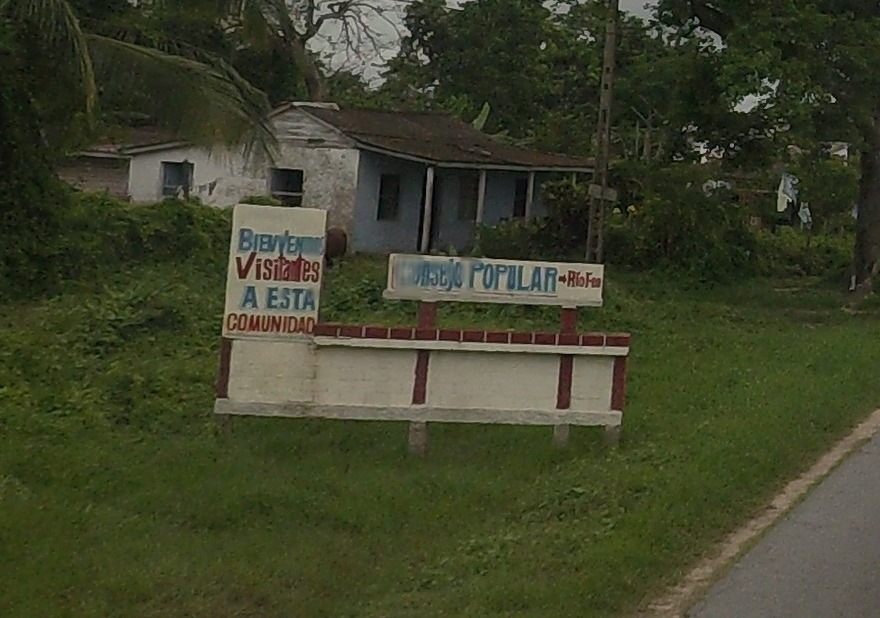
Río Feo, San Luis, Pinar del Río Province

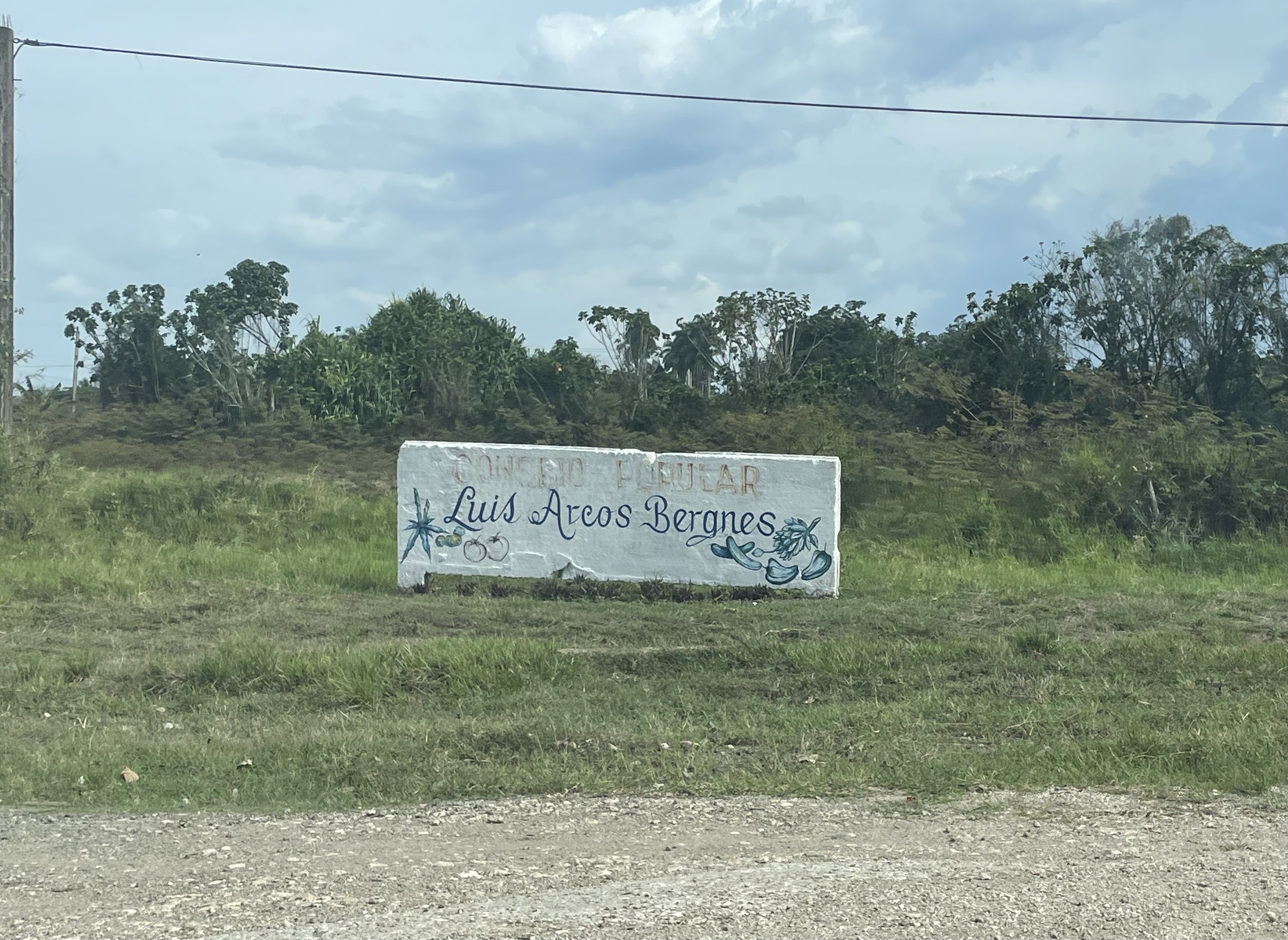
Luis Arcos Bergnes, Camajuaní, Villa Clara Province

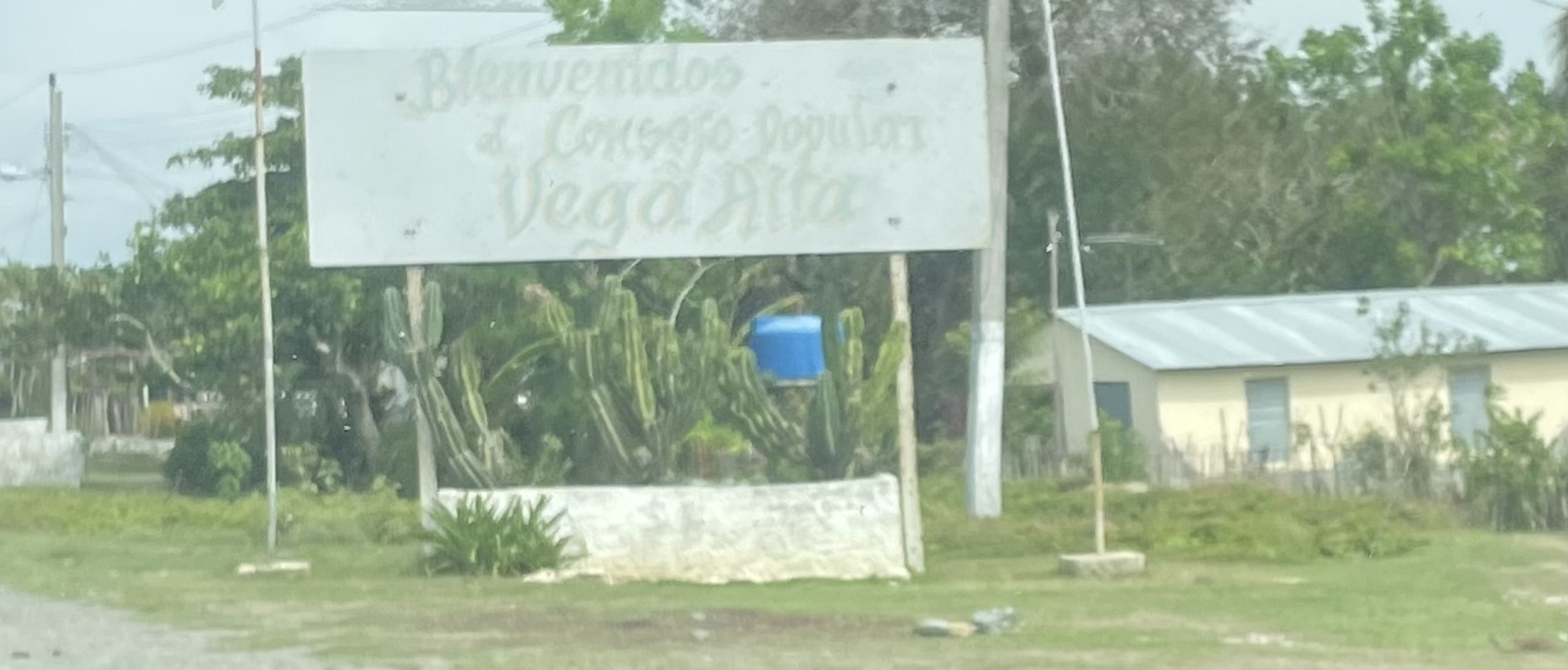
Vega Alta, Camajuaní, Villa Clara Province (a little faded)

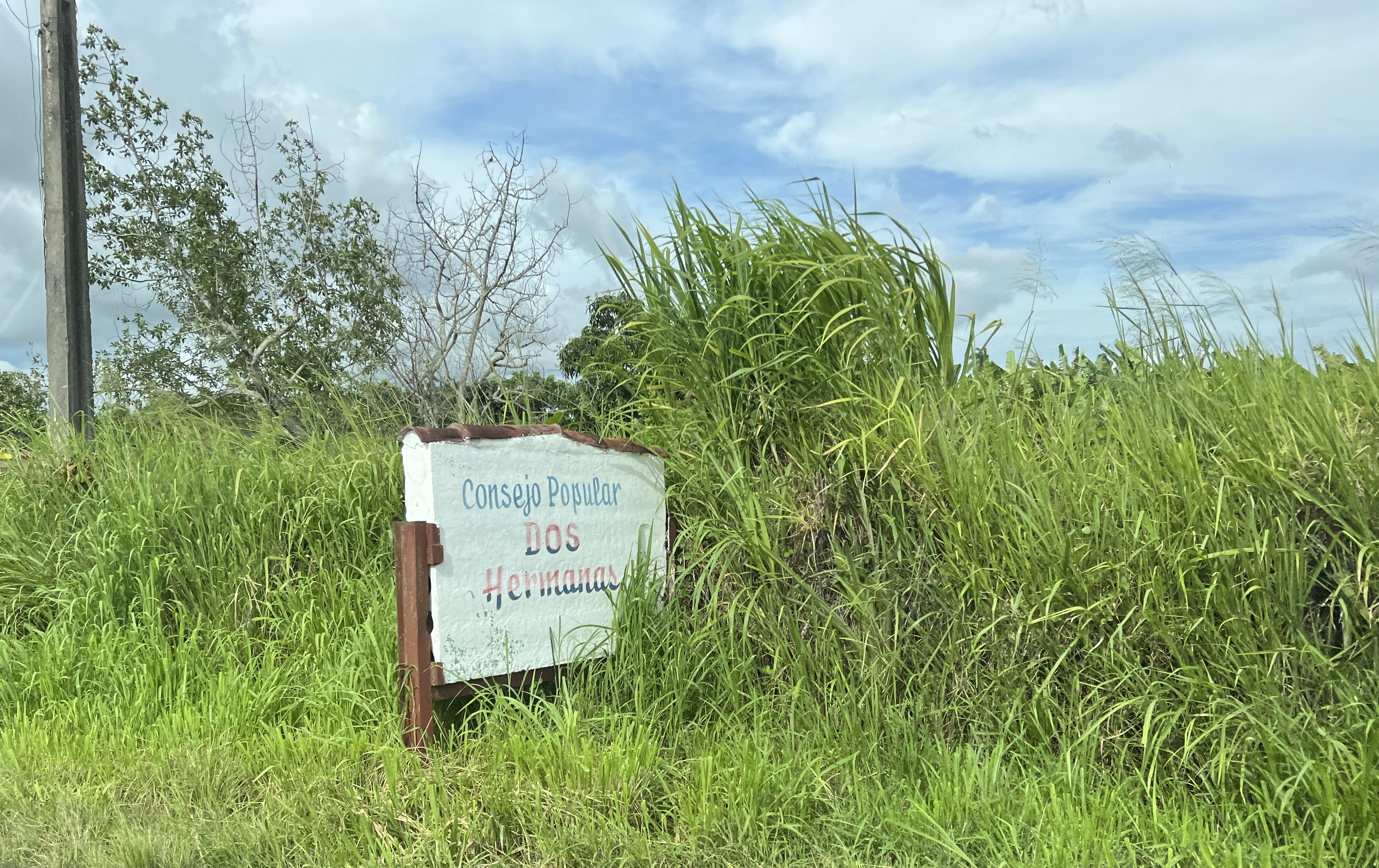
Dos Hermanas, Encrucijada, Villa Clara Province

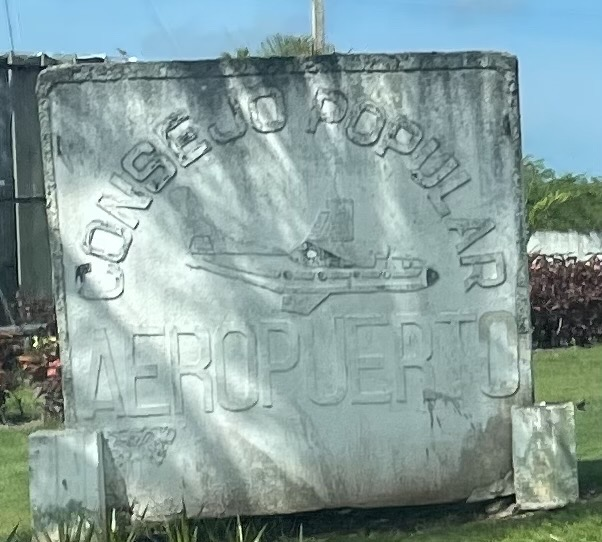
Aeropuerto, Santa Clara, Villa Clara Province

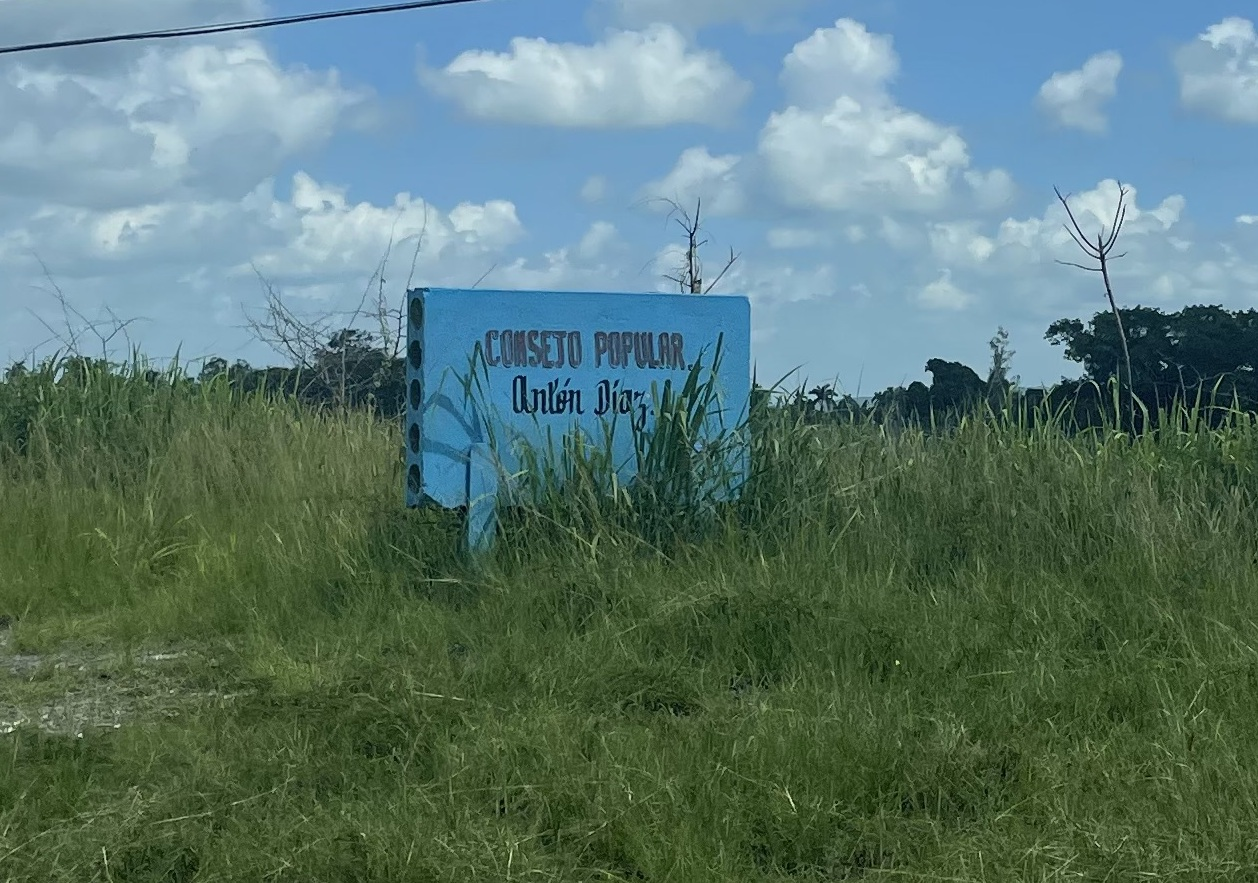
Anton Diaz, Santa Clara, Villa Clara Province

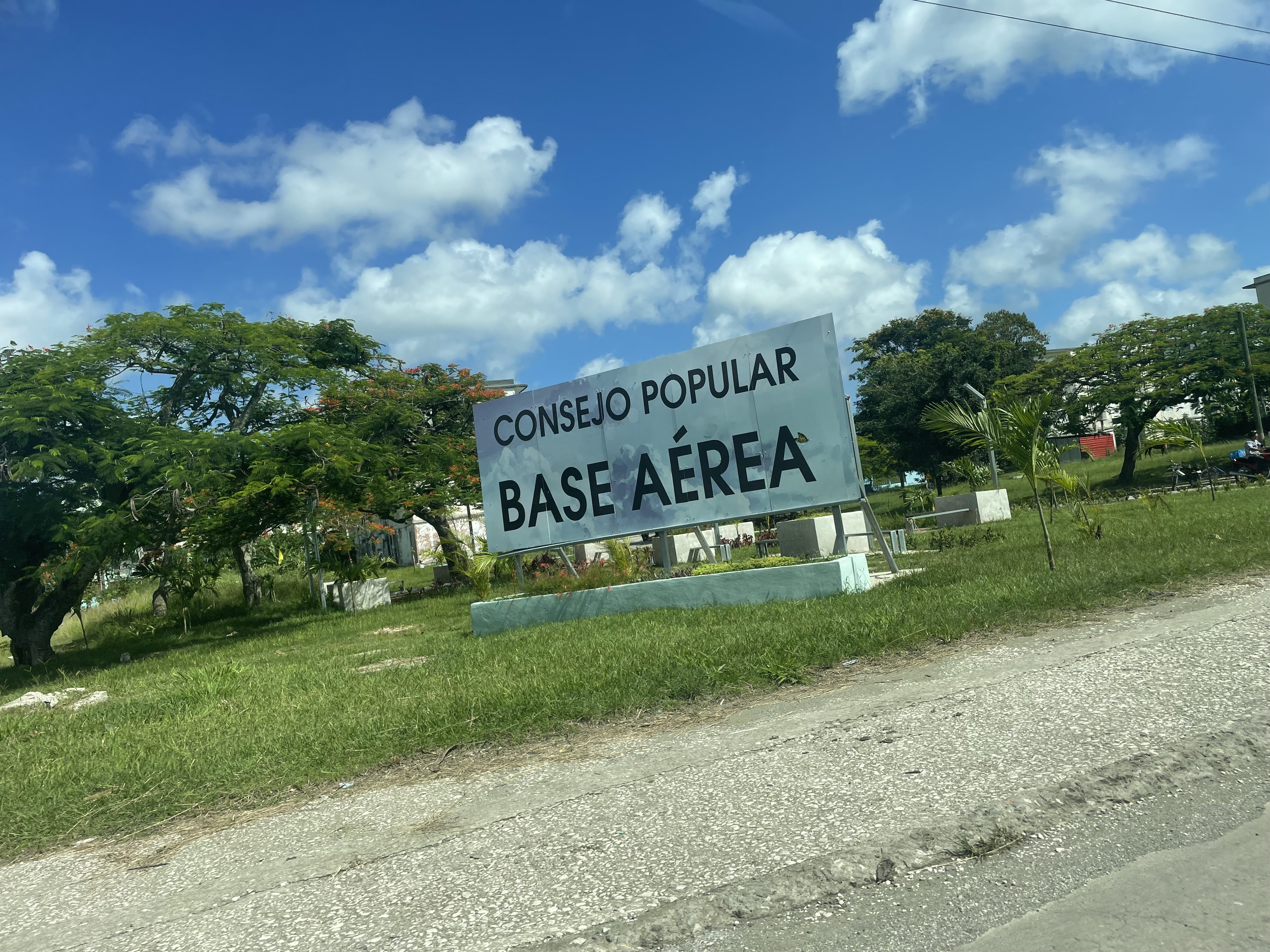
Base Aérea, Santa Clara, Villa Clara Province

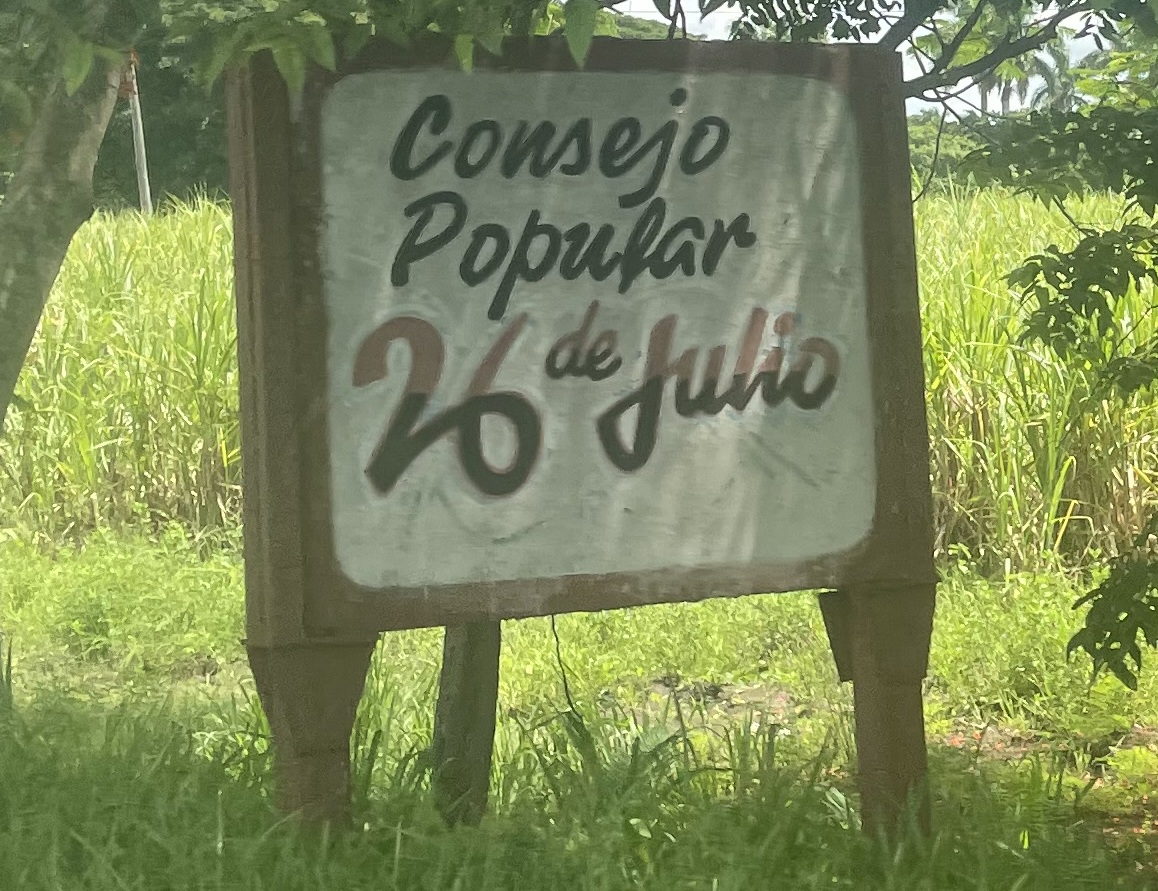
26 de Julio, Santo Domingo, Villa Clara

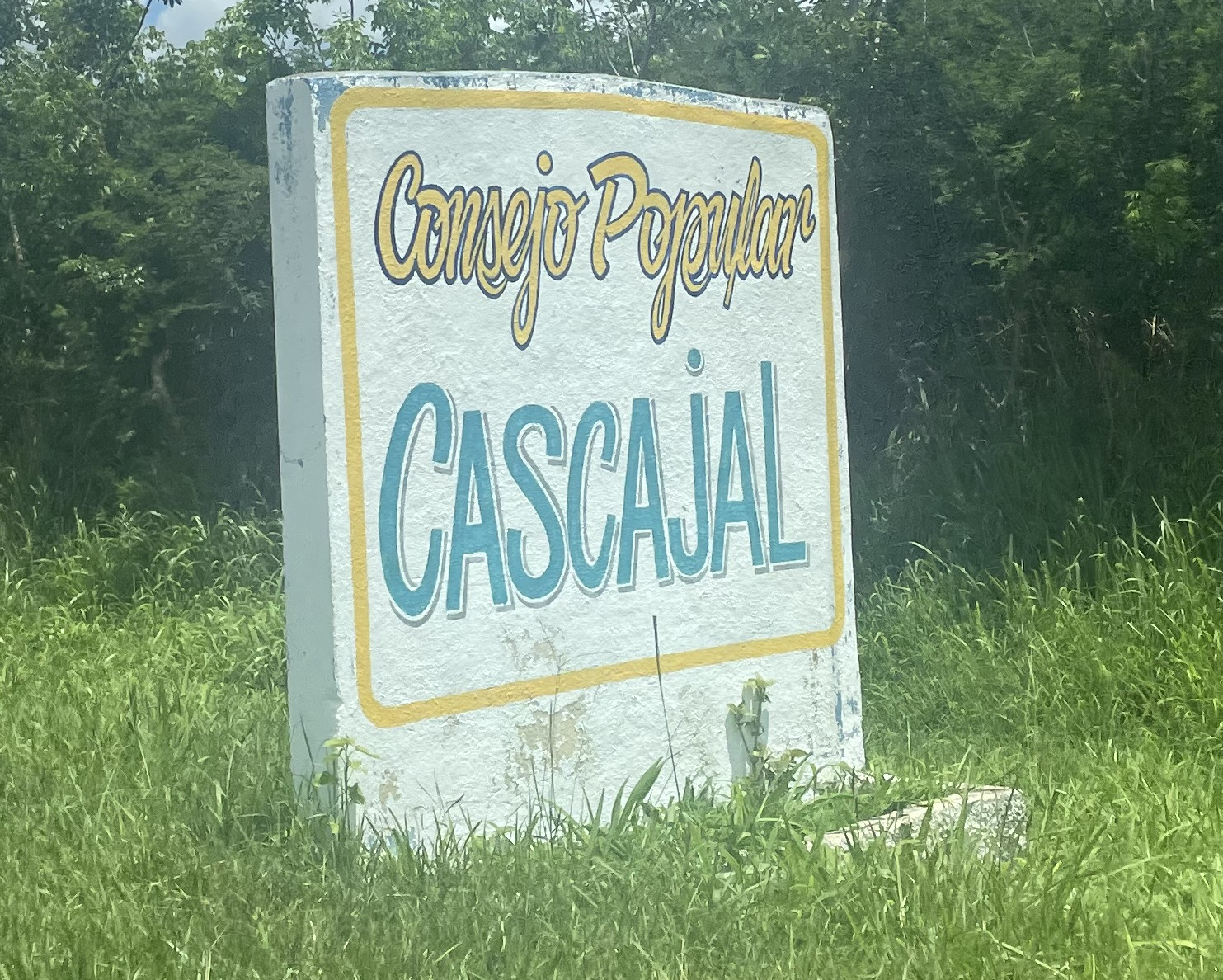
Cascajal, Santo Domingo, Villa Clara

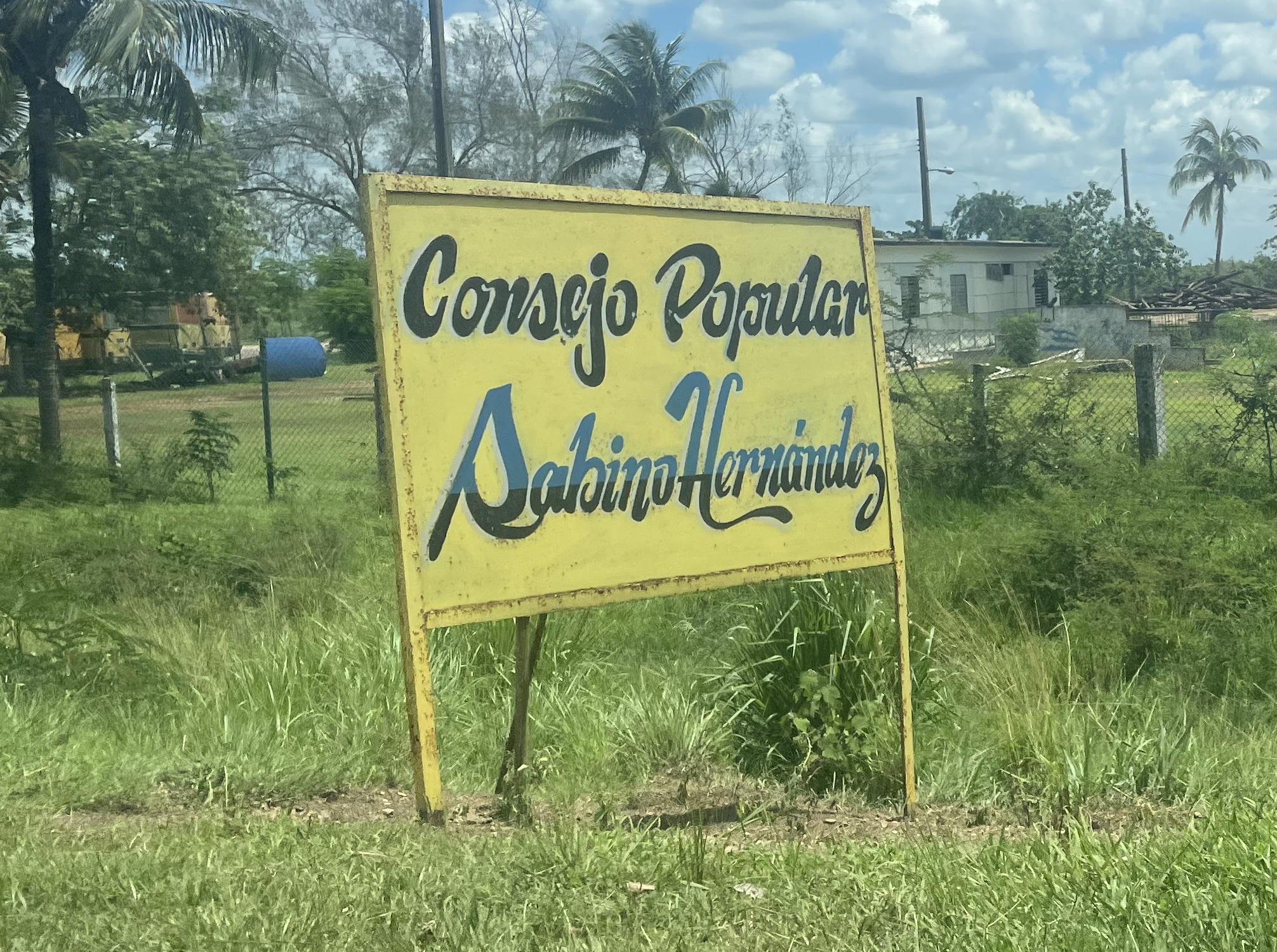
Sabino Hernández, Santo Domingo, Villa Clara
