= Félix Ramos y Duarte =

Cuban educator and writer (1848–1924)

- Born: 1848; San José de los Ramos, Captaincy General of Cuba, Spanish Empire
- Died: 1924 (aged 75–76); Havana, Cuba
- Occupations: Educator, writer
- Years active: 1868–1919
- Known for: Writing the first Mexican-Spanish dictionary

Félix Ramos y Duarte (1848–1924) was a Cuban educator and writer, who was exiled from Cuba in 1868. He moved to Yucatán, Mexico and later lived in Veracruz and Mexico City. He compiled the first dictionary of terms that were specifically "Mexican Spanish". Ramos returned to Cuba after it gained independence from Spain. He taught briefly and then served as President of the Teacher Examination Board. He published many textbooks and educational articles.

== Biography ==
Félix Ramos y Duarte was born in 1848 in San José de los Ramos, Matanzas Province, Cuba. Ramos was attending the Teachers Normal School in Cuba when he was accused of conspiracy and fled to Mexico.

=== Exile in Mexico ===
Arriving in Yucatán in 1868, he was one of the first arrivals from Cuba at the beginning of the Ten Years' War. Ramos began working as a primary school teacher in Yucatán and was one of the Cuban intellectuals who tutored Rita Cetina Gutiérrez.

Ramos' first employment was as a teacher of religion at the School of San Idelfonso but he began teaching as the Chair of line drawing at the State Literary Institute the following year. In 1879, he obtained his diploma for primary and higher education from the Normal School attached to the Institute.

In addition to teaching, Ramos published articles in educational journals including La Escuela Primaria (The Elementary School), El Pensamiento (Thinking), El Eco del Comercio (The Echo of Commerce), La Revista de Mérida (The Magazine of Mérida), as well as textbooks. In 1875, his mathematics textbook received official recognition as a text for schools and was reprinted into four editions. In 1879, a textbook he created on line drawing was also selected as an official text for Yucatán schools.

Ramos moved to Veracruz in 1881 and taught industrial design at the adult night school. In 1885 he worked at the Model School of Orizaba with German and Swiss teachers and earned the title Professor of Theoretical and Practical Education under the objective educational system on 20 July 1886. Ramos taught and published articles in Veracruz until he became ill and was forced to quit his job and move to Mexico City in 1888.

Recovered from his illness, in 1889, Ramos taught for three and a half years as Professor of literature, national history and Castilian grammar at the Presbyterian Theological Seminary and simultaneously worked as a Professor at the American Presbyterian School and the Methodist Normal School Daughters of Juarez. He continued with the Methodist School until 1894 and with the American Presbyterian school until 1896.

During this time frame, in 1895 Ramos published several more educational books, including the first Dictionary of Mexican Spanish (Diccionario de mejicanismos. Colección de locuciones i frases viciosas con sus correspondientes críticas i correcciones fundadas en autoridades de la lengua; máximas, refranes, provincialismos i retoques populares de todos los estados de la República Mejicana), which examined idioms, phrases, maxims and dialectic usages that were different from standard Castilian in an attempt to improve the use of the Spanish language in Mexico. In 1897, he published a treatise on teaching Castilian Spanish which was accepted as a textbook and in 1899 a collection of Mexican curiosities that was encyclopedic in nature.

=== Return to Cuba ===
On 20 September 1899, Ramos returned to Cuba and began working at a secondary school in the village of Güines. In March, 1900, he began serving as principal of the schools of San Lazaro and San Leopoldo in Havana. Over the summer break, in June, 1900, he and a group of teachers traveled to the US to study English at Harvard, but returning to Cuba after the course, Ramos found that he had been laid off. Juan Miguel Dihigo Mestre intervened on his behalf and was able to help Ramos secure a position as president of the board for teacher's examiners in Havana, for the years 1901–1903. Ramos continued publishing in Mexico while living in Cuba, but many of his works remain unpublished or are irretrievably lost. His masterwork, a Yucayo dictionary with 6,000 lexical items, handpainted watercolors, and broad historical, archaeological and geographical information of the origins of language in Cuba was completed in 1919 in Cuba, but not printed and may have been lost.

Ramos died in Havana in 1924.

== Selected works ==
- Tratado de educación cívica. Unpublished manuscript. (1889) (in Spanish) Located in the Biblioteca del Instituto de Literatura y Linguística y sede de la Sociedad Económica de Amigos del País (Library of the Institute of Literature and Linguistics at the headquarters of the Economic Society of Friends of the Country).
- Diccionario de mejicanismos. Printer Eduardo Dublán, Mexico. (1895) (in Spanish)
- Tratado de lenguaje castellano: Ó, guia para la enseçanza de la lengua materna. Printer Eduardo Dublán, Mexico. (1896) (in Spanish)
- Diccionario de curiosidades historicas, geograficas, hierograficas, crónologicas, etc. de la República Mejicana. Printer Eduardo Dublán, Mexico. (1899) (in Spanish)
- Tratado de onomatología o estudio sobre los nombres propios. Printer A. Carranza and Co., Mexico. (1906) (in Spanish)
- Diccionario de observaciones críticas sobre el lenguaje de escritores cubanos. Tipografía Guerreros Hernández, Mexico. (1912) (in Spanish)
- El Diccionario yucayo, 8 volumes. Unpublished manuscript. (1919)
