= Santo Domingo, Cuba =

Santo Domingo
- Municipality
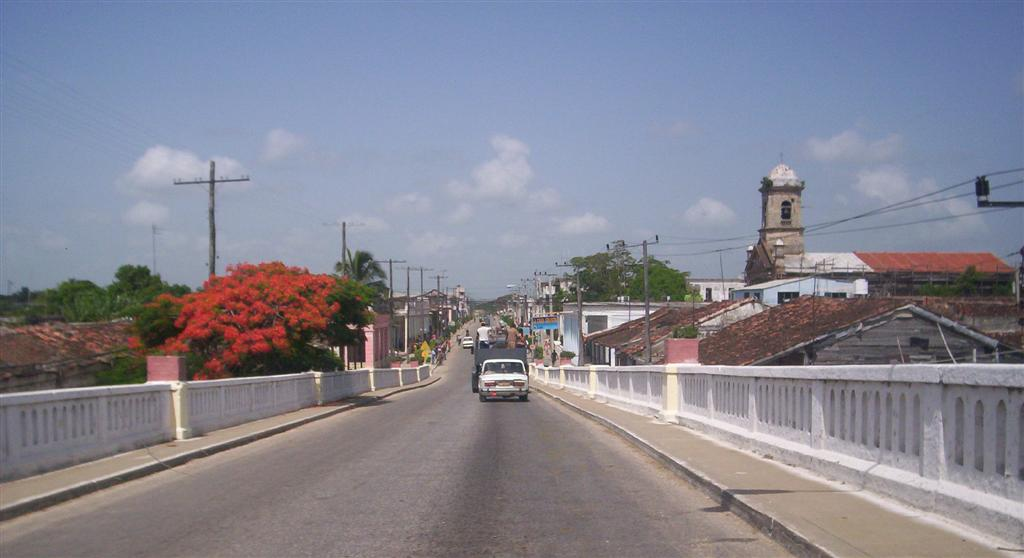
- The Carretera Central across Santo Domingo

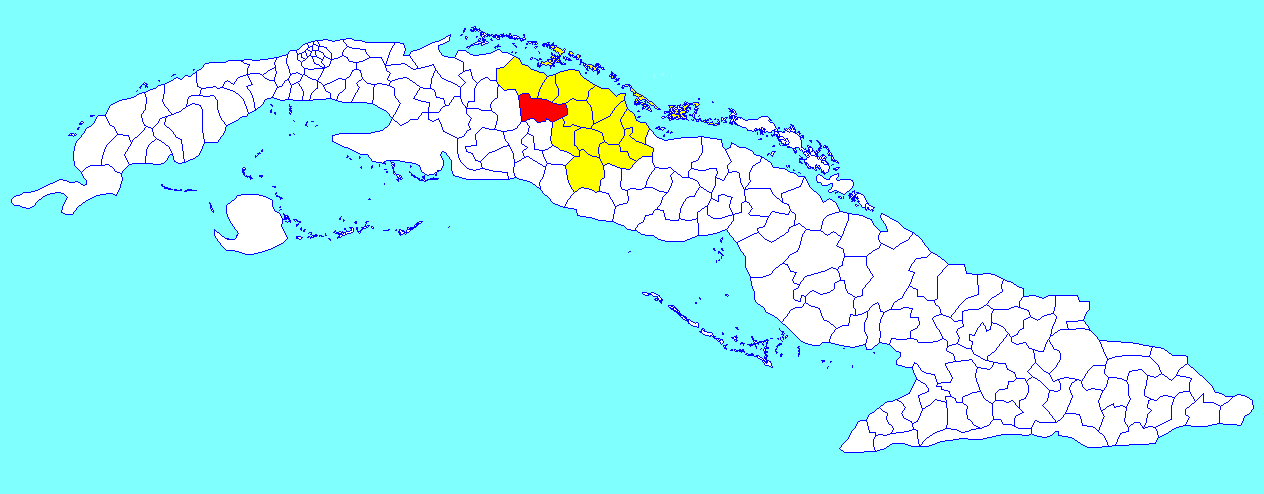
- Santo Domingo municipality (red) within Villa Clara Province (yellow) and Cuba
- Coordinates: 22°35′0″N 80°14′18″W
- Country: Cuba
- Province: Villa Clara
- Founded: 1819
- Established: 1879 (Municipality)

Area
  - Total: 883 km^{2} (341 sq mi)
- Elevation: 50 m (160 ft)

Population (2022)
  - Total: 46,984
  - Density: 53.2/km^{2} (138/sq mi)
- Time zone: UTC-5 (EST)
- Area code: +53-422

Santo Domingo is a municipality and town in the Villa Clara Province of Cuba.

It was founded in 1819 and established as a municipality in 1879.

== Geography ==
The town is divided into the wards (barrios) of Este (east) and Oeste (west). The municipality includes the villages of Álvarez, Amaro, Arenas, Baracaldo, Bermejal, Cascajal, Cayo Bejuco, Cerrito, George Washington, Jiquiabo, La Criolla, Las Casimbas, Manacas, Mordazo, Puerto Escondido, Río, Rodrigo, Sabino Hernández, San Bartolomé, San Juan de Amaro, San Marcos, Ulacia (Carlos Baliño), Ventiseis de Julio, Yabucito. Until the 1977 municipal reform, Santo Domingo included Jicotea too, nowadays part of Ranchuelo municipality.

The wards ("consejos populares" in spanish) of the municipality are Cascajal, Mordazo, Sabino Hernández, Manacas, Washington, La Palma y El Jardín (main town of Santo Domingo), 26 de Julio, Baliño, and Rodrigo-Amaro.

== Demographics ==
In 2022, the municipality of Santo Domingo had a population of 46,984. With a total area of 883 km^{2} (341 sq mi), it has a population density of 53/km^{2} (140/sq mi).

== See also ==
- Municipalities of Cuba
- List of cities in Cuba
