= Piedra (disambiguation) =

Piedra is a hair disease.

Piedra (Spanish for "rock") may also refer to:

- Piedra (Spain), a tributary of the river Jalón
- Piedra, California, a community in the United States
- Piedra River (Colorado), a tributary of the San Juan River, United States
- Piedra (Mexican cuisine), a stuffed corn dumpling
- Piedra, Camajuaní, an agricultural production cooperative in the Cuban province of Villa Clara

== See also ==
- Piedra Blanca, a city in the Dominican Republic
- Piedras Blancas, a town in Asturias, Spain
- Piedras Blancas Light, a lighthouse in the U.S. state of California
- Piedra del Águila Dam, in Patagonia, Argentina
- Piedras Negras, Coahuila, a city in Mexico
- Piedras Negras (Maya site), an archaeological site in Guatemala
- Piedra Guadalupe, a rock in the Farallon Islands, California, United States
