= Guerrero, Cuba =

Guerrero
- Rural Barrio
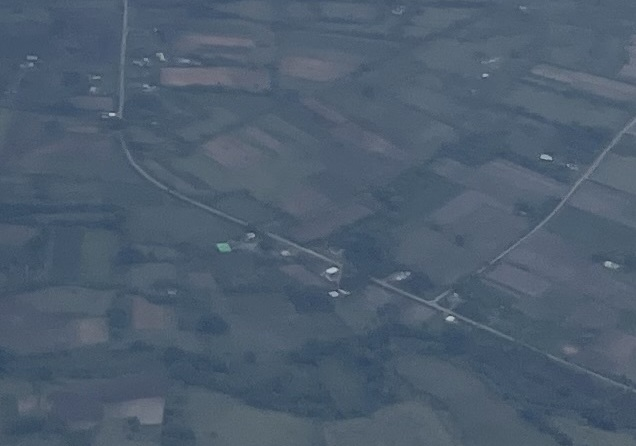
- Guerrero and Ibarra seen from above in 2023

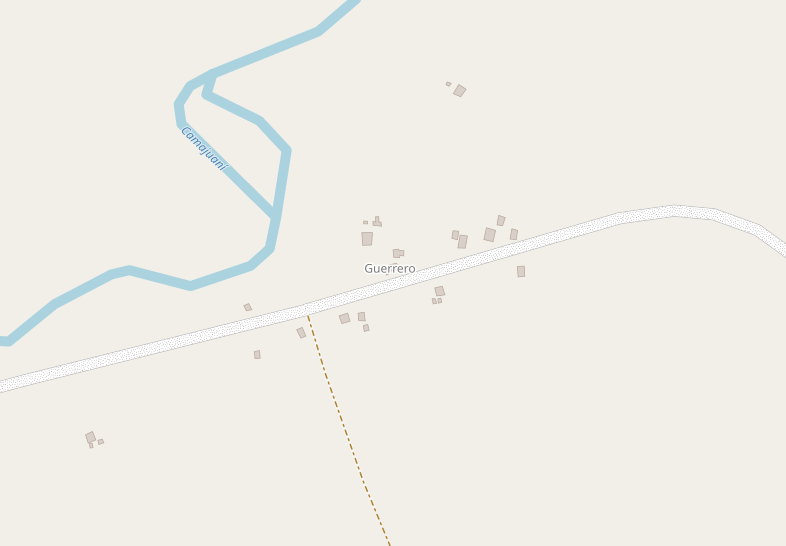
- Guerrero on OpenStreetMap

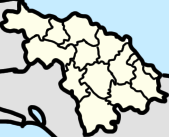
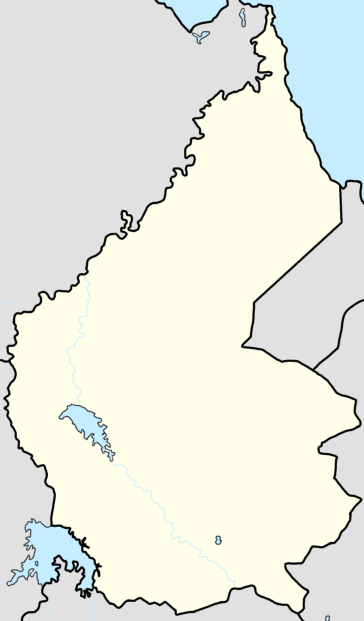
- Location within Cuba Location within Villa Clara Province Location within Camajuaní
- Coordinates: 22°32′43″N 79°46′54″W
- Country: Cuba
- Province: Villa Clara
- Municipality: Camajuaní
- Ward: Vega Alta

Population
  - Estimate: 39
- Demonym: Guerreros

Guerrero is a rural barrio in Camajuani, Cuba.

== Geography ==
Guerrero is located in the central area of Vueltas and Vega Alta. Guerrero is connected to Vega Alta by bridge in the Camajuaní River and to Vueltas by going through Ibarra and Piedra.

Guerrero has CCS Mártires de Vueltas.

=== Environmental issues ===
Due to its rural position, Guerrero constantly experiences severe transit disruptions. During periods of heavy rainfall, flooding of the bridge to Vega Alta and the road to Vueltas severely restricts travel and communication with nearby areas.

== History ==
On the 25th April 1895, a few hours after Juan Bruno Zayas’s departure from Vega Alta, he ended up in Guerrero.

In 2018, several settlements in Villa Clara were flooded, in Camajuaní these settlements included Rincón, Guajén, Sagua la Chica, Macagual, Guerrero, Floridano, Vega Alta, and Vega de Palma.

== Transportation ==
Guerrero is located on the unpaved road of Camino Guerrero (Guerrero Road), the path goes from the Camino La Luz - Vega Alta (La Luz - Vega Alta Road) to the Calle Maceo (Maceo Road) in Vueltas.

In the state public transportation of Camajuaní, there is a bus route going from Vueltas to Guerrero.

== Economy ==
According at the DMPF (Departamento de control de la Dirección Municipal de Planificación Física or Management Control Department Municipal Physical Planning in English) of Camajuani, Guerrero is a settlement not linked to any source of an economic or job development.
