= Sagua la Chica =

- Rural settlement
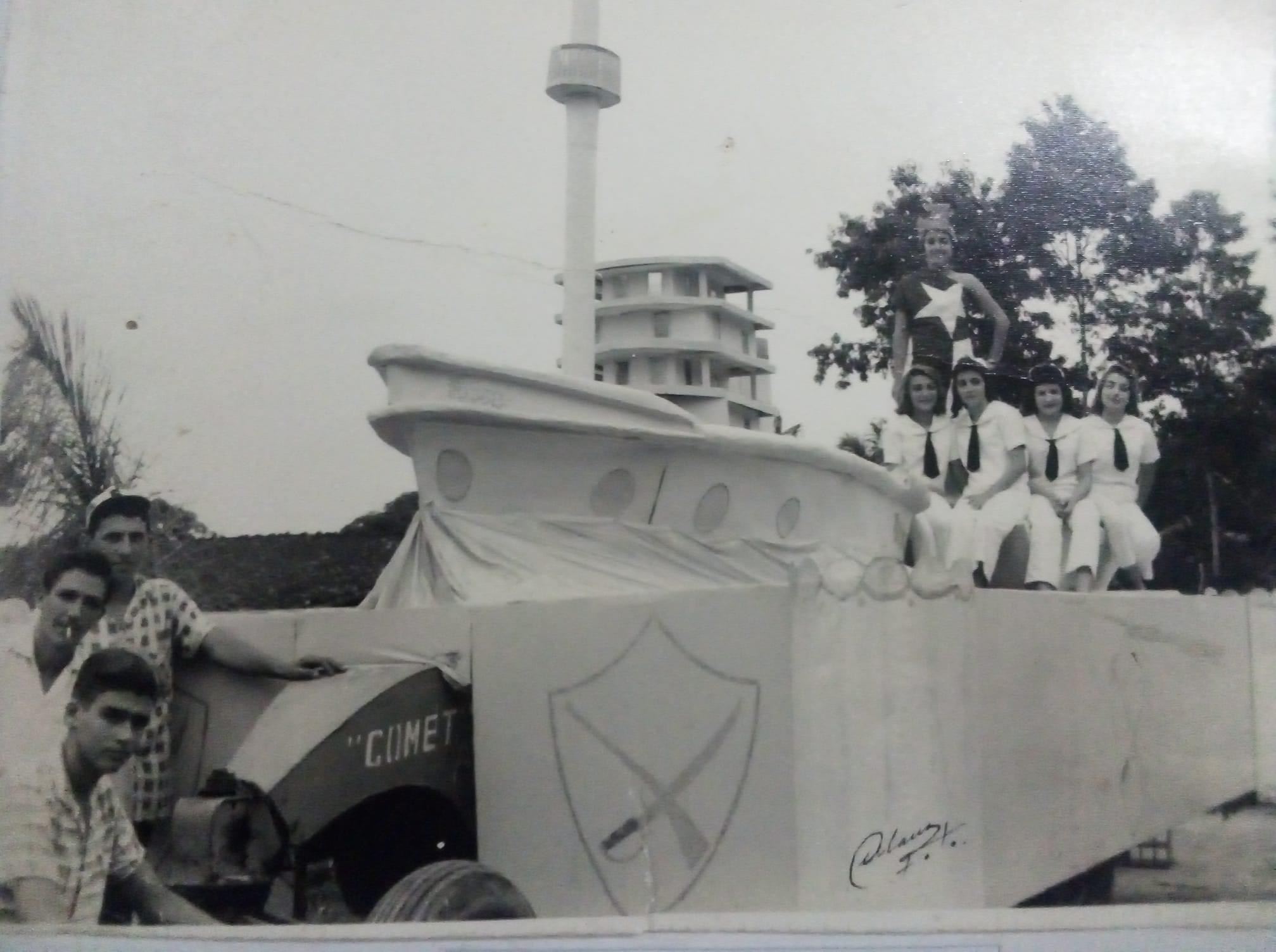
- Carriage of the Parrandas of the Barrio La Marina in Sagua La Chica, 1960

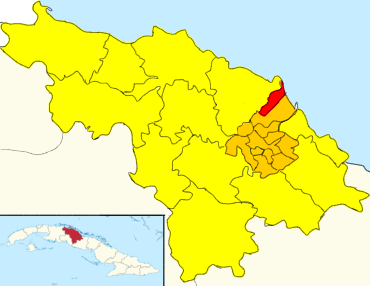
- Sagua la Chica (red) in Camajuaní (orange) in Villa Clara (yellow)

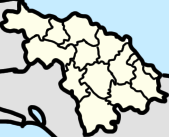
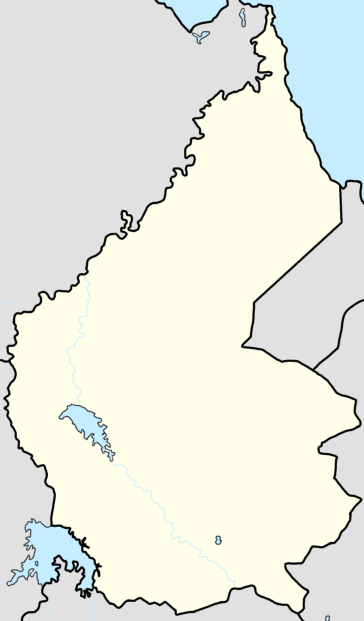
- Location in Cuba Sagua la Chica (Villa Clara Province) Sagua la Chica (Camajuaní)
- Coordinates: 22°41′22″N 79°41′44″W
- Country: Cuba
- Province: Villa Clara
- Municipality: Camajuani
- Ward: Batalla de Santa Clara

Area
  - Total: 0.4004 km^{2} (0.1546 sq mi)

Population
  - Total: 1,447
  - Density: 3,614/km^{2} (9,360/sq mi)
- Postal Code: 52400

Sagua la Chica also known as Sagua is a rural settlement in Camajuani, Cuba. It is located in the ward of Batalla de Santa Clara, in the north of Camajuaní, with the town having a population of 1,447 people. Sagua la Chica has the same name as the Sagua la Chica river and is 174 mi (or 280 km) away from the capital of Havana.

== Education ==
There is one school in the town, which is:

- Restituto Muñiz Primary

== Geography ==
Towns nearby Sagua la Chica include Resulta, Hermanos Toledo, Jumagua, Colonia Miguel del Sol (also known as Miguel del Sol), Jagüey, and Crucero Carolina (also known as just Carolina).

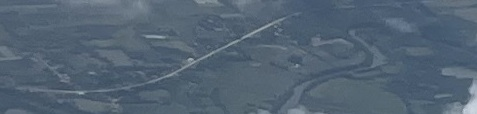
Town of Sagua La Chica next to the Sagua la Chica River, which divides Camajuaní and Encrucijada, seen from above

The town of Sagua la Chica borders the municipality of Encrucijada and is in the ward of Batalla de Santa Clara.

== Economy ==
According at the DMPF (Departamento de control de la Dirección Municipal de Planificación Física or Management Control Department Municipal Physical Planning in English) of Camajuani, Sagua la Chica is a settlement not linked to any source of an economic or job development but still are maintained.

== History ==
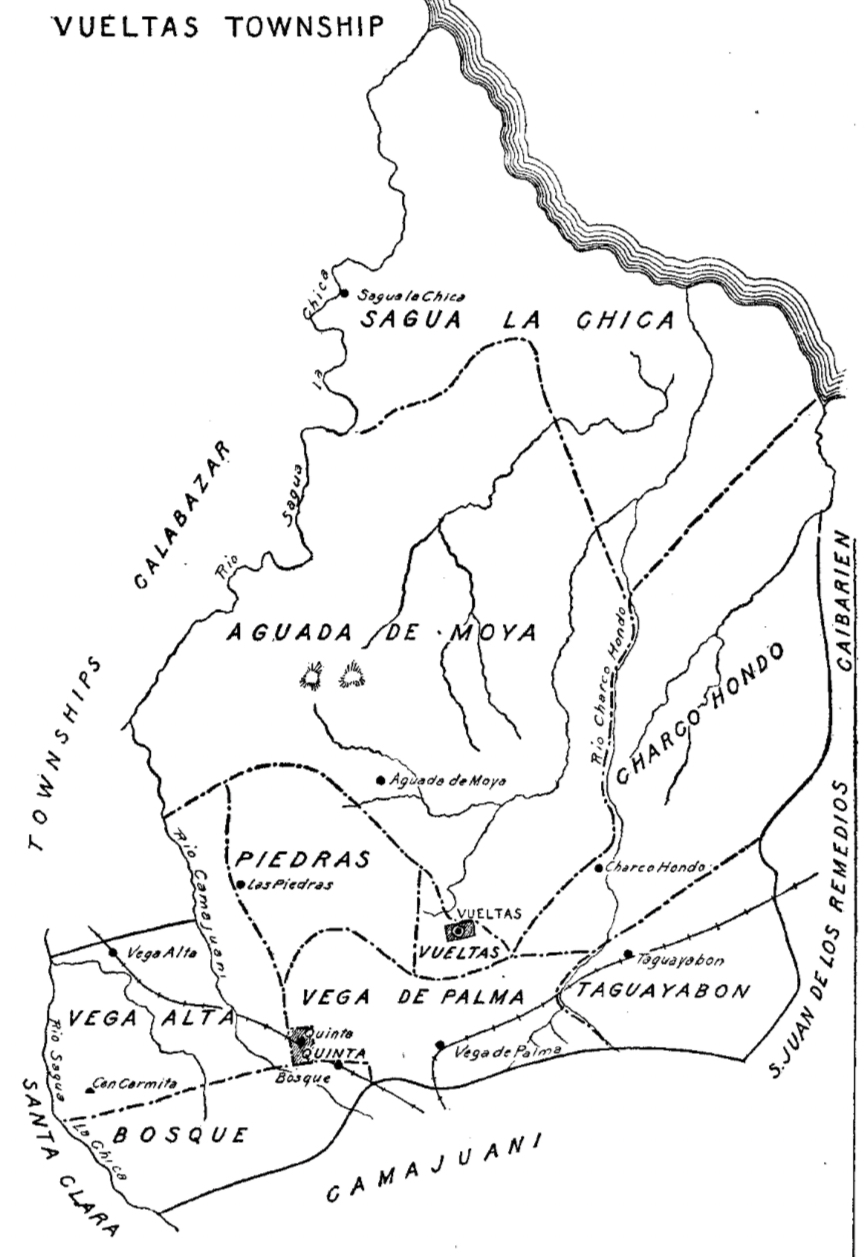
Map of Barrios of Vueltas in 1909

Until 1976 Sagua was a barrio of the former municipality of Vueltas.

In 2018, several settlements in Villa Clara were flooded, in Camajuaní these settlements included Rincón, Guajén, Sagua la Chica, Macagual, Guerrero, Floridano, Vega Alta, and Vega de Palma.

Until around 2019-2020 Sagua la Chica was a ward (consejo popular), before it became part of the ward of Batalla de Santa Clara.

== Resources ==
Vega Alta, Sagua la Chica, and Crecencio Valdés are the only towns in Camajuani that make clay.

== See also ==
- Sagua la Grande
- Santa Clara, Cuba
