= Quintas =

Quintas may refer to:

- Quintas (footballer), Portuguese player born 1965
- Quintas (conscription system), formerly used by the Spanish Armed Forces

== See also ==
- Quinta (disambiguation)
