= Rincón (Camajuaní) =

Halmet in Cuba

- Farm
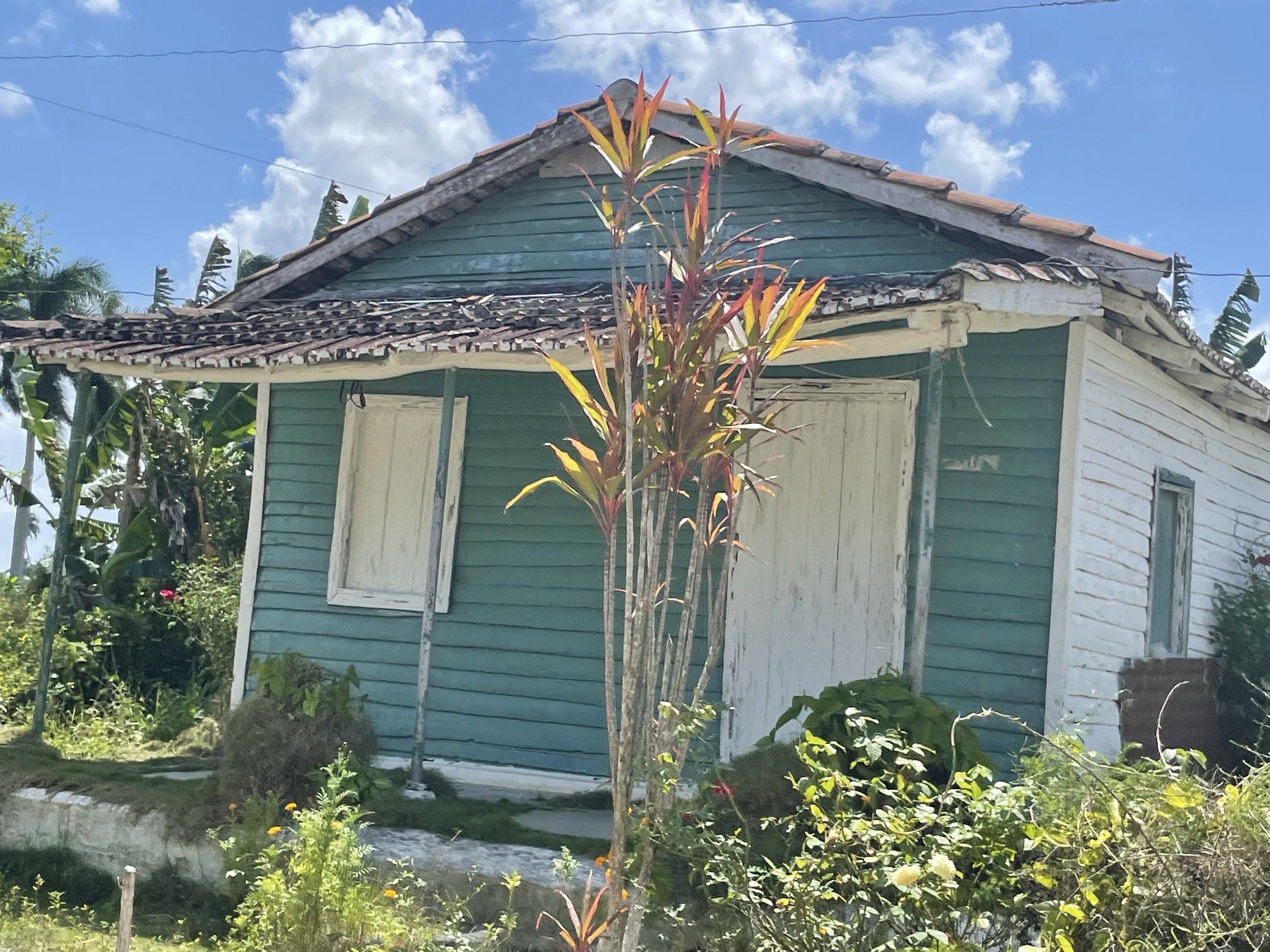
- A house in Rincón

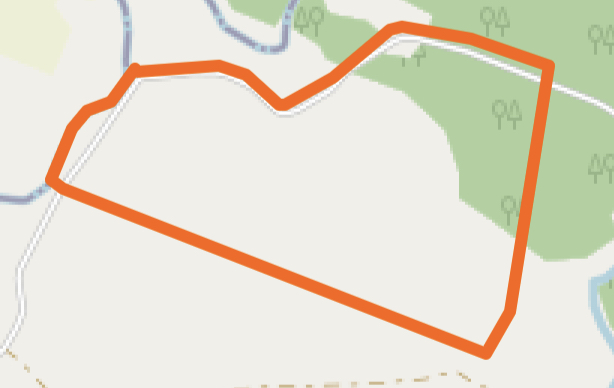
- Map of Rincón (unofficial borders, information is not exact, it is similar to the official border)

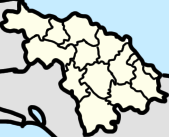
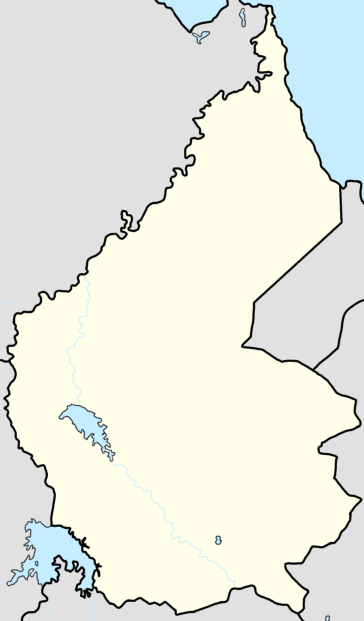
- Location within Cuba Location within Villa Clara Province Location within Camajuaní
- Coordinates: 22°34′12″N 79°48′02″W
- Country: Cuba
- Province: Villa Clara
- Municipality: Camajuaní
- Popular Council: Vega Alta

Population
  - Total: 102

Rincón also known as El Rincón, Finca Rincón, and Finca el Rincón is a settlement of the Cooperativa de Créditos y Servicios (CCS) Raul Torres Acosta. in Camajuaní, Villa Clara, Cuba. Nearby towns are La Lebisa, Guajén, Vega Alta, Canoa, CPA Benito Ramírez, La Luz, Guerrero, and El Perico.

The Saint Lazarus sanctuary is located in Rincón where many Cubans make an annual pilgrimage on December 17 to mark the feast day of San Lázaro.

== Geography ==
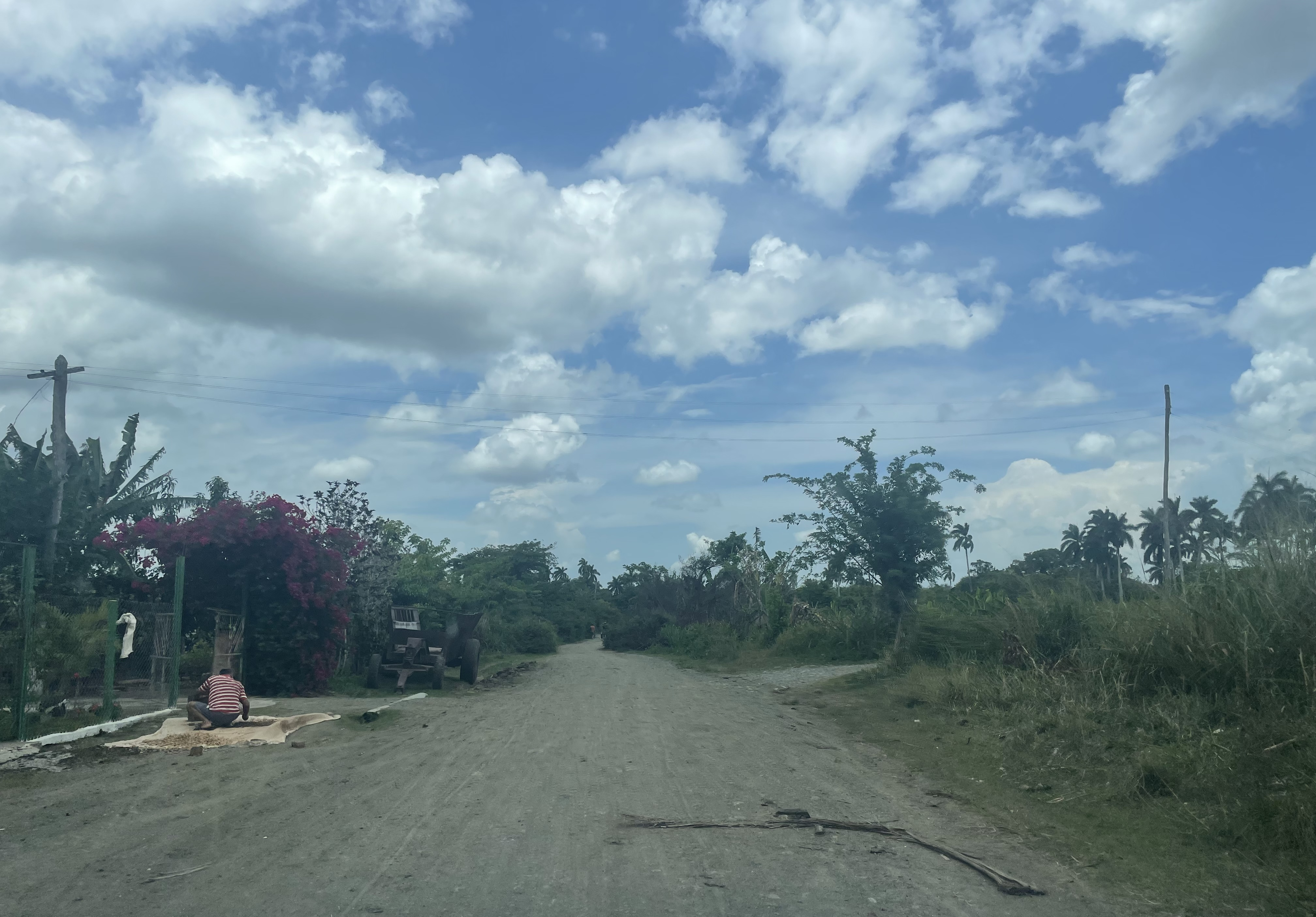
The Camino Vega Alta - El Rincón

The road that Rincón is on is called Camino Vega Alta - El Rincón, or in English Vega Alta - El Rincón Road, which is 6 km.

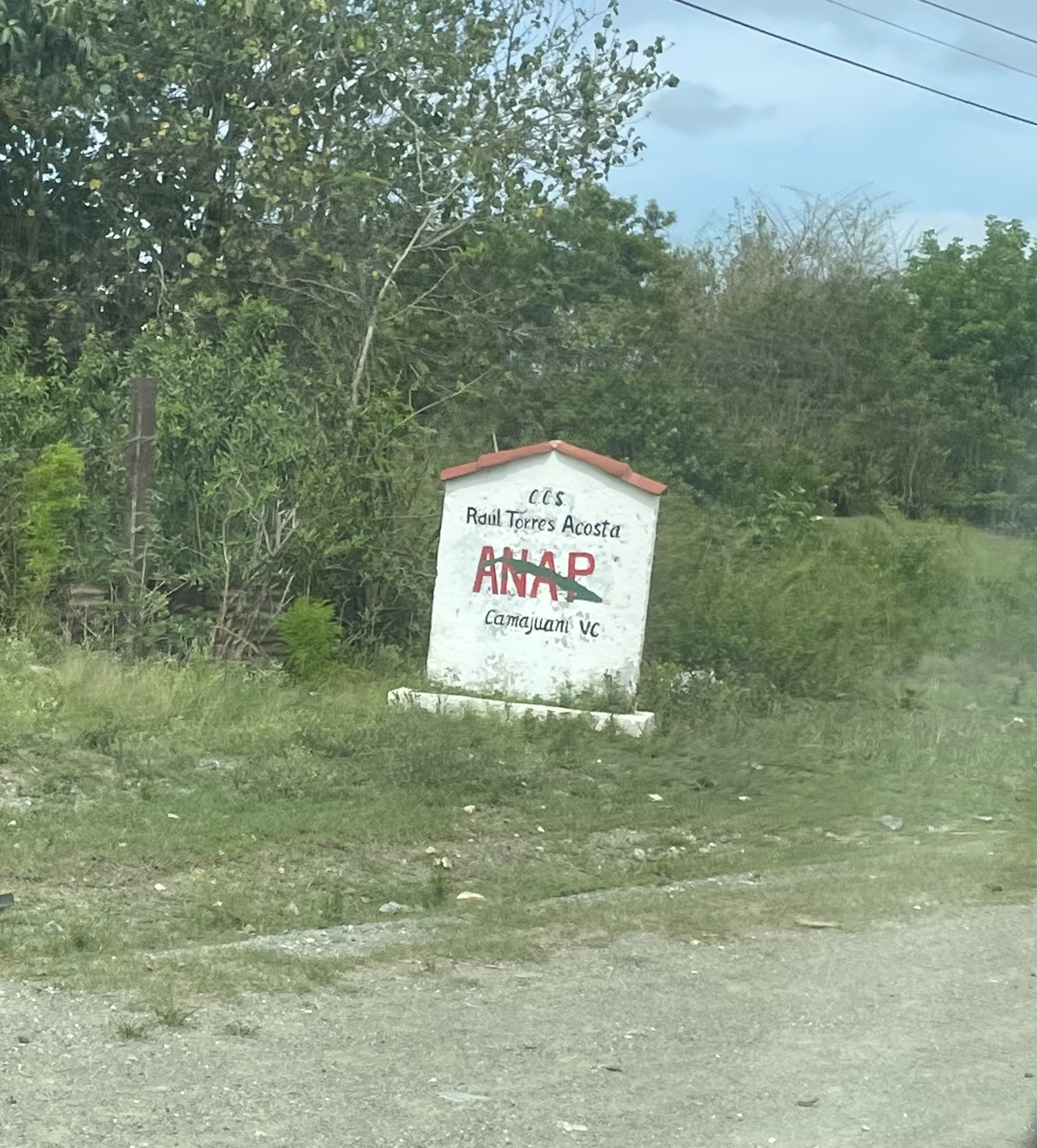
Sign of the CCS "Raúl Torres Acosta" in Rincón

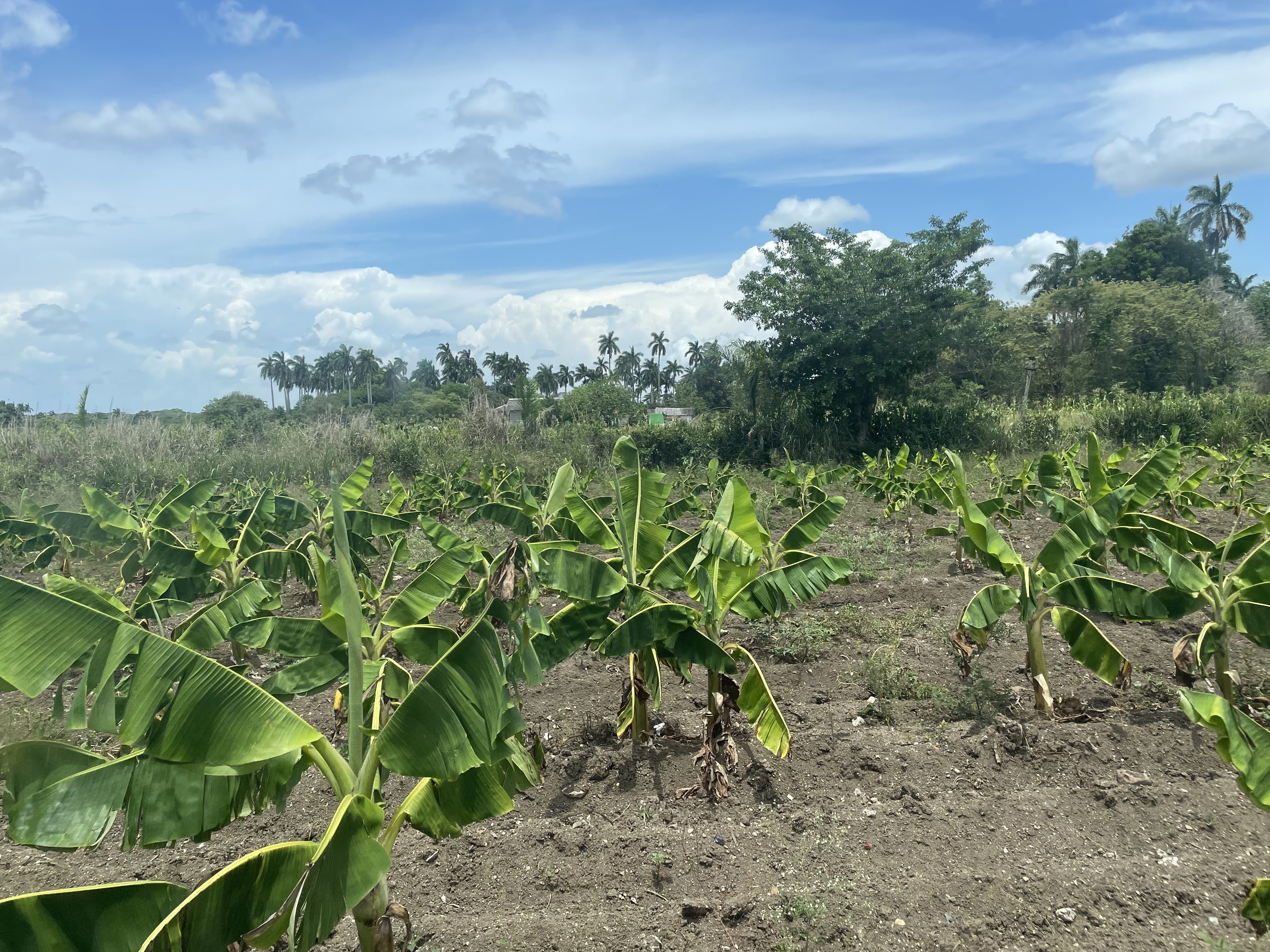
Farmland in El Rincón

Rincón includes the CCS of CCS Raúl Torres Acosta and CCS Juan Francisco Aro.

The Urocoptis villarensis can be found in Rincon.

== History ==
El Rincón used to be a part of the former barrio of Vega Alta, in the former municipality of Vueltas.

== In culture ==
Rincón is Recounted in:

- BOHEMIA Edición De La LIBERTAD, book written around 1959

== See also ==
- Luis Arcos Bergnes, Cuba
- La Quinta, Cuba
- Aguada de Moya, Cuba
