= La Quinta (disambiguation) =

La Quinta, California is a resort city in the United States.

La Quinta may also refer to:

- LaQuinta, a house listed on The National Register of Historic Places in Bartlesville, Oklahoma, United States
- La Quinta, Cuba, a small town in Villa Clara
- La Quinta Inns & Suites, a hotel chain
- La Quinta Formation, a geological formation in Venezuela and Colombia
- La Quinta Formation, Mexico, an amber-bearing Mexican formation

== See also ==
- Quinta (disambiguation)
