= Vega Alta, Cuba =

Vega Alta
- Ward and Urban Settlement
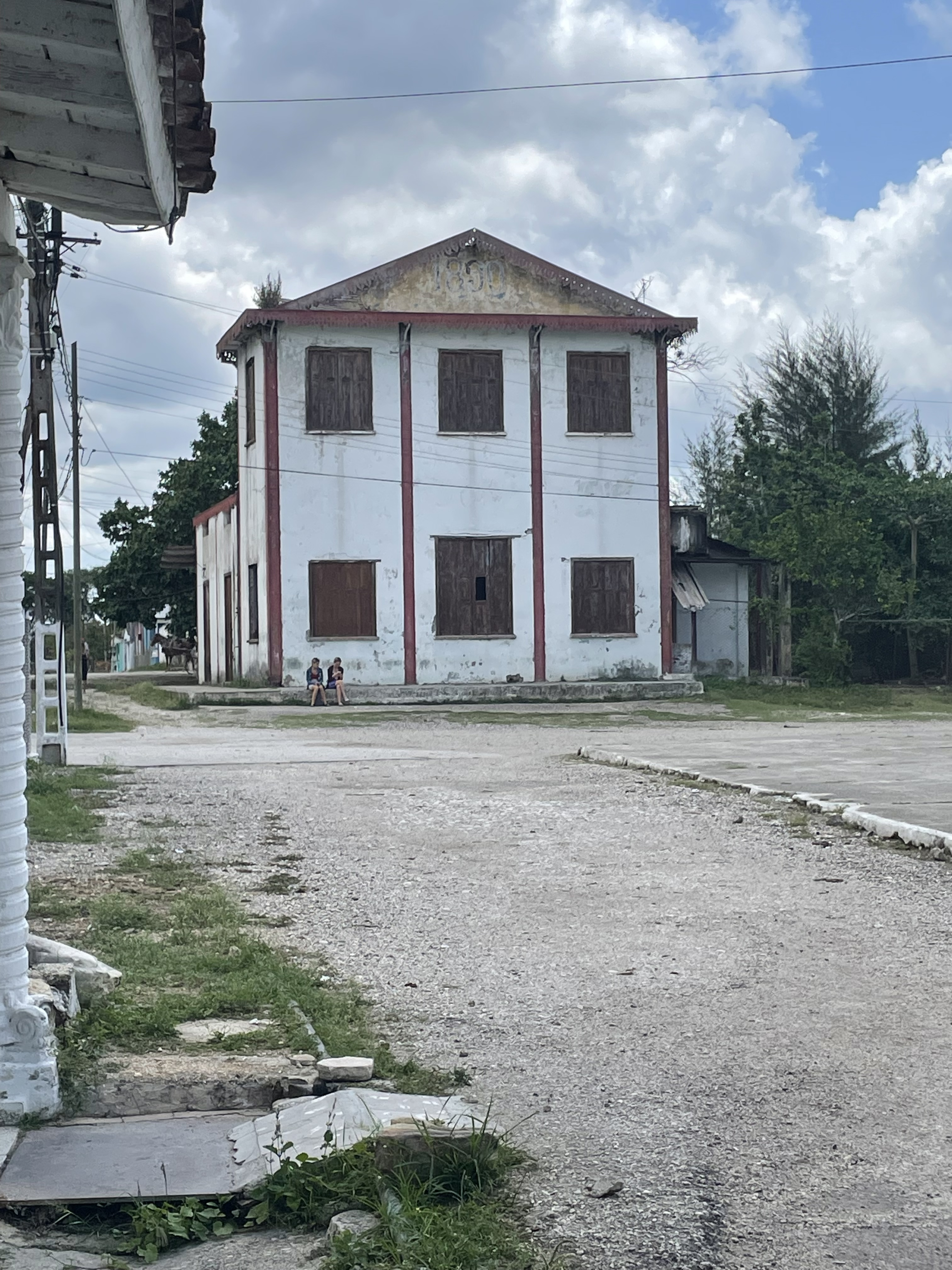
- The back of the Railstation in Vega Alta, 2023

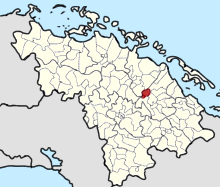
- Map of Vega Alta (Red) in Villa Clara

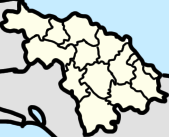
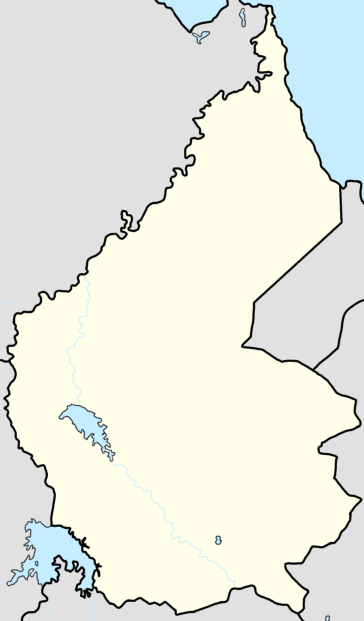
- Map of where Vega Alta is in Cuba Vega Alta (Villa Clara Province) Vega Alta (Camajuaní)
- Coordinates: 22°32′59″N 79°49′08″W
- Country: Cuba
- Province: Villa Clara
- Municipality: Camajuaní
- Foundation: 1876

Government
  - President: Fidel Fernández Mederos

Area
  - Total: 0.37 km^{2} (0.14 sq mi)

Population
  - Total: 1,061
  - Density: 2,900/km^{2} (7,400/sq mi)
- Demonym: Vegaltense
- Postal Code: 52500

Vega Alta is a ward (consejo popular) and an urban settlement in Camajuaní, Villa Clara, Cuba. It is in the vicinity of the Sagua la Chica River, and borders the wards of Constancia, Aguada de Moya, Carmita, and Batalla de Santa Clara.

”Vega Alta” translates to “high valley” in English, referring to the tobacco valleys in the region.

== Geography ==
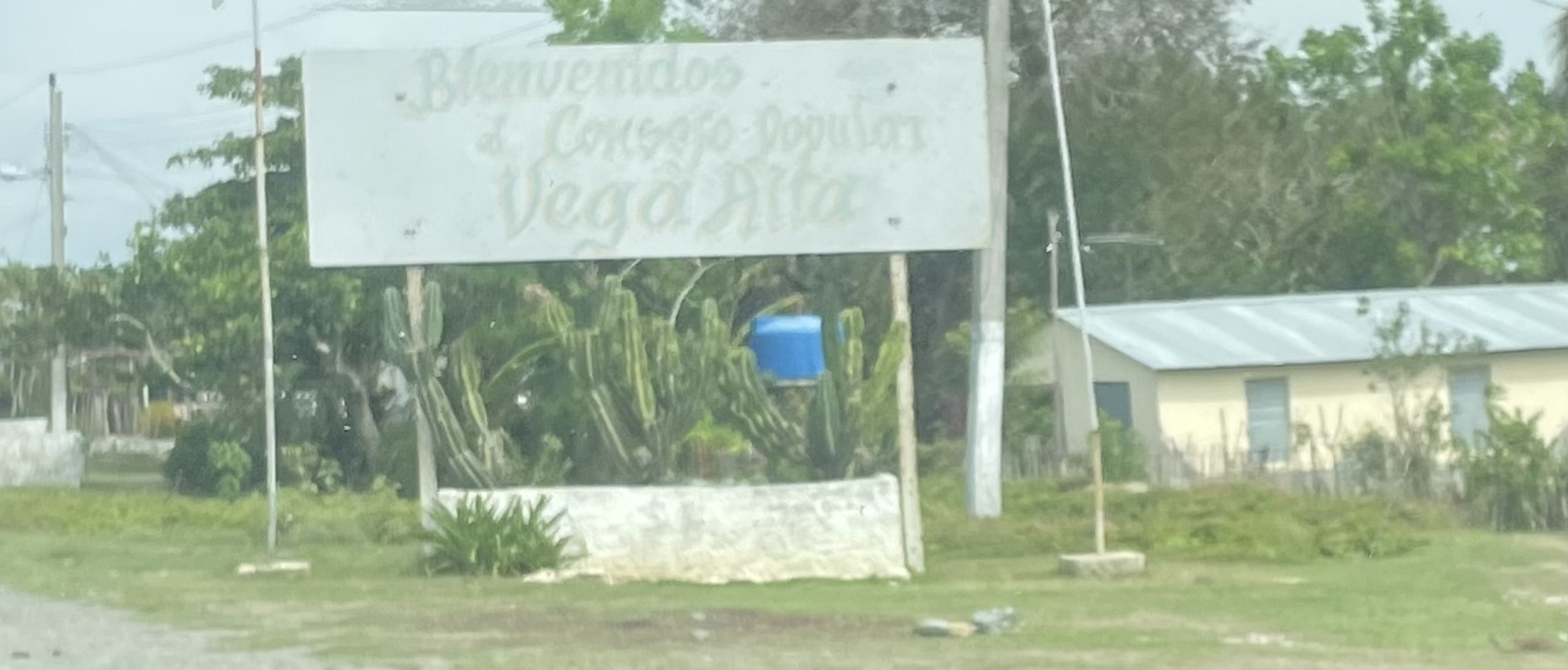
Sign welcoming you into the ward

=== Ward of Vega Alta ===
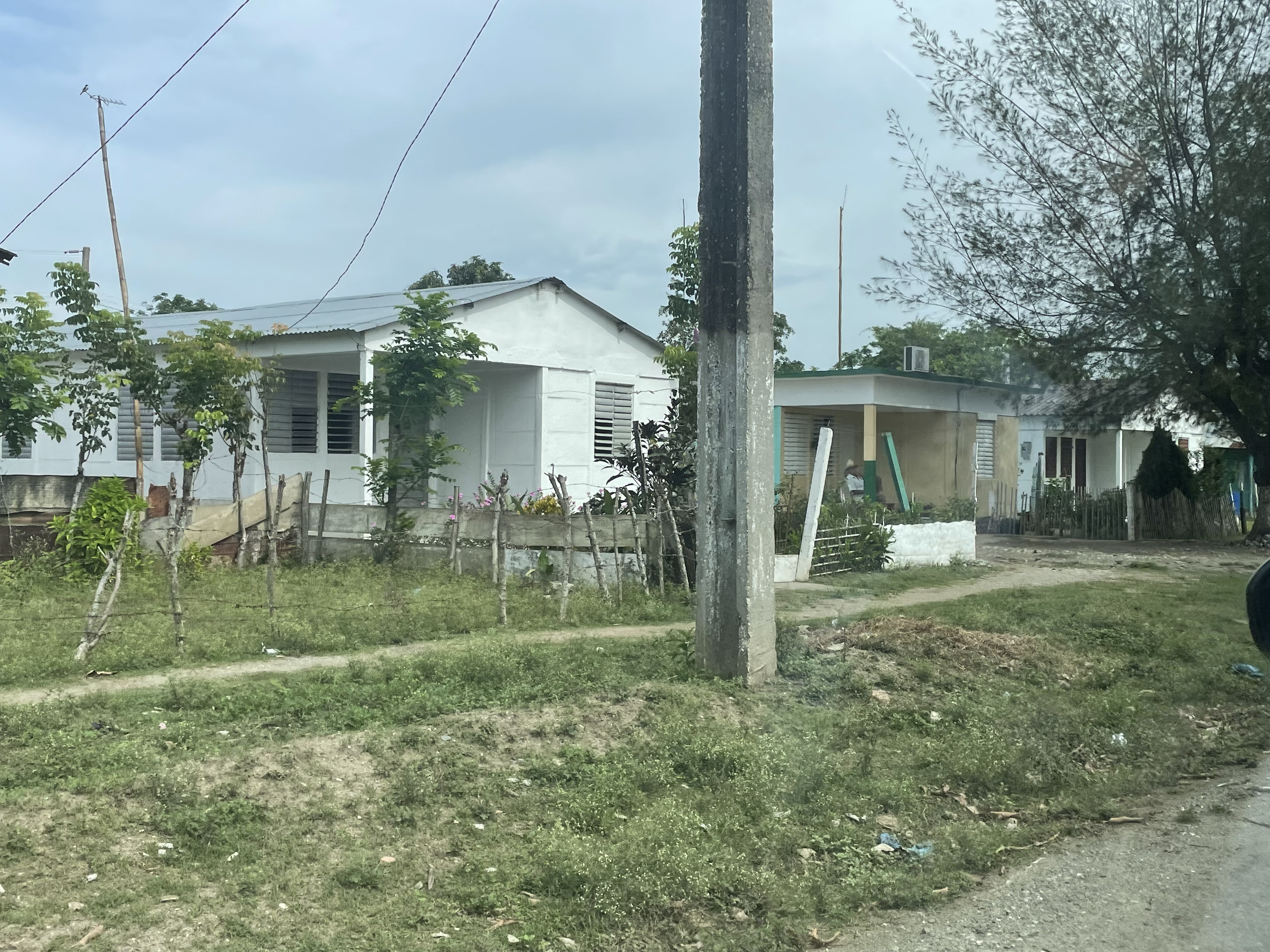
Houses in Benito Ramirez

Legally recognized settlements in the ward (consejo popular) include:

- Vega Alta (largest village)
- Benito Ramírez
- Guerrero
- Guajén (split with Aguada de Moya)
- Puente Pavón

Other smaller settlements in the ward include:

- El Rincón
- La Levisa
- El Cubano

=== Settlement ===
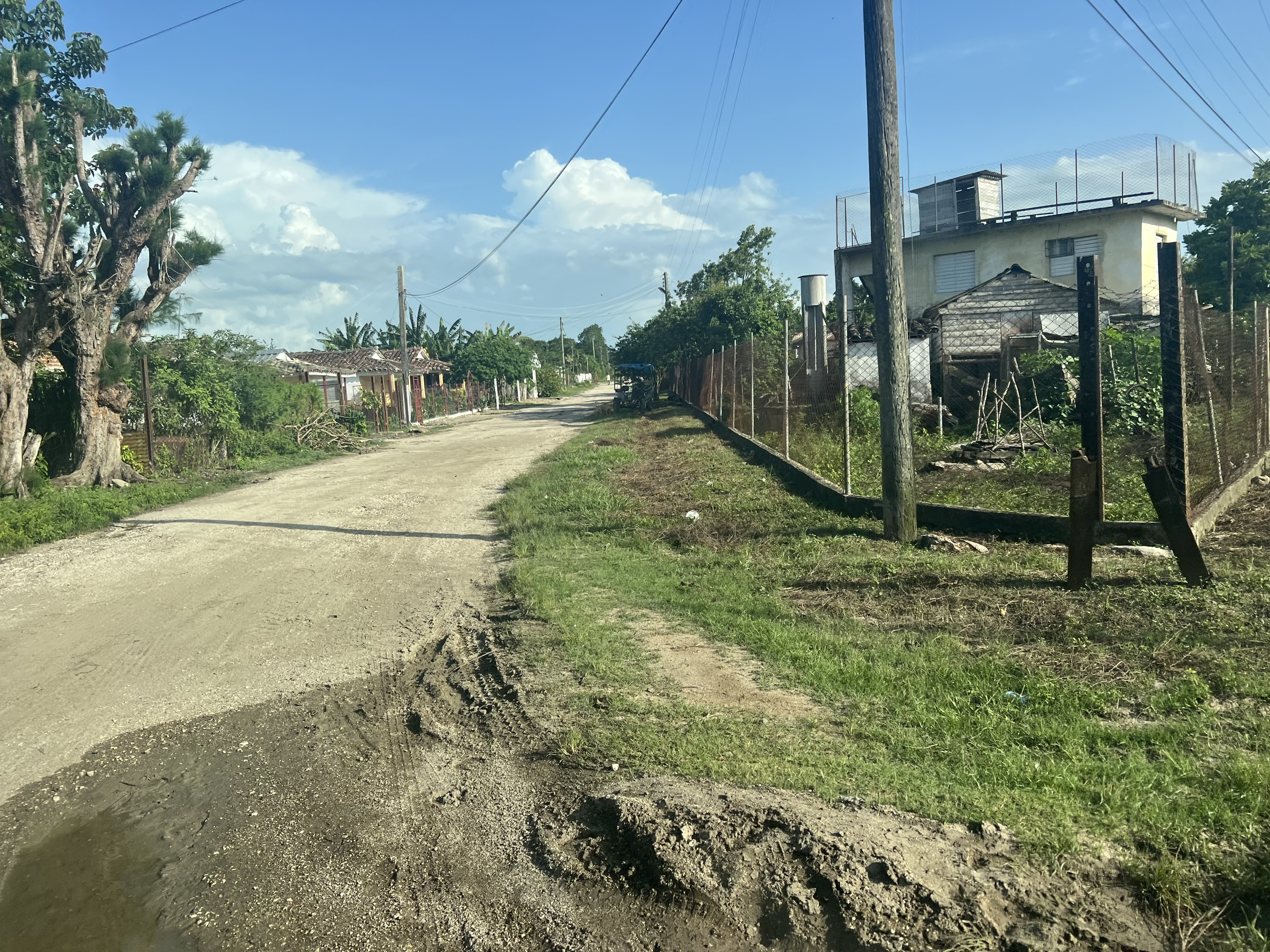
Calle Gloria in Vega Alta

The 3 main streets of the settlement of Vega Alta are the Calle Gloria (east), the Calle Juan Bruno Zayas (center), and the Calle Cornel Casallas (west). To the north of the main town is the Camino Vega Alta–El Rincón, which continues onto the Camino del Guajén, and goes to El Rincón and El Guajén. To the south is the Camino La Luz–Vega Alta to Benito Ramirez and La Luz, which has a junction with the Camino el Cubano, to El Cubano, and another junction which continues straight to Guerrero.

Nearby places that are north, northeast, east, southeast, south, southwest, west, and northwest of the town are:

Rincón
Canoa Rincón
Farmland Farmland
Farmland La Luz
Carmita

In 2018, Villa Clara was flooded throughout the entire province, in Camajuaní the places that were flooded were El Rincón, El Guajén, Sagua la Chica, Macagual, Guerrero, Floridano, Vega Alta, and Vega de Palma. During high tide, the Sagua la Chica River sometimes goes until the park located in Vega Alta on Calle Manuel Herrada, about 0.46 kilometres (0.29 mi) from the center of the river, and on low tide its normal for big trucks and cars to cross the river to get to Canoa and Encrucijada.

=== Park Vega Alta ===
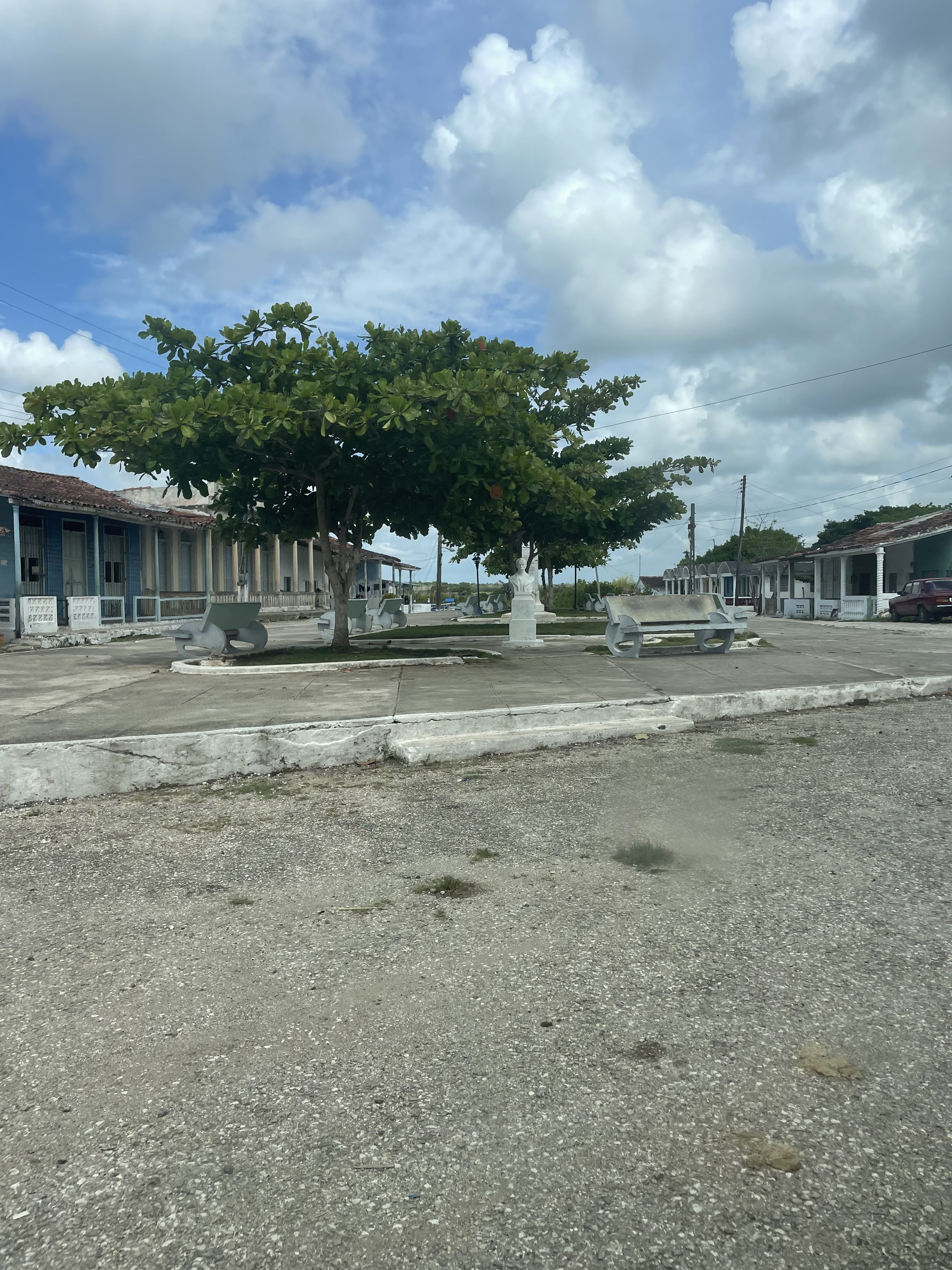
Park Vega Alta, 2023

The Park of the town of Vega Alta (Parque del poblado de Vega Alta) shorten to Park Vega Alta is the park of Vega Alta, is it about 850 m2, and it is one of 4 places in Camajuaní which has free WiFi.

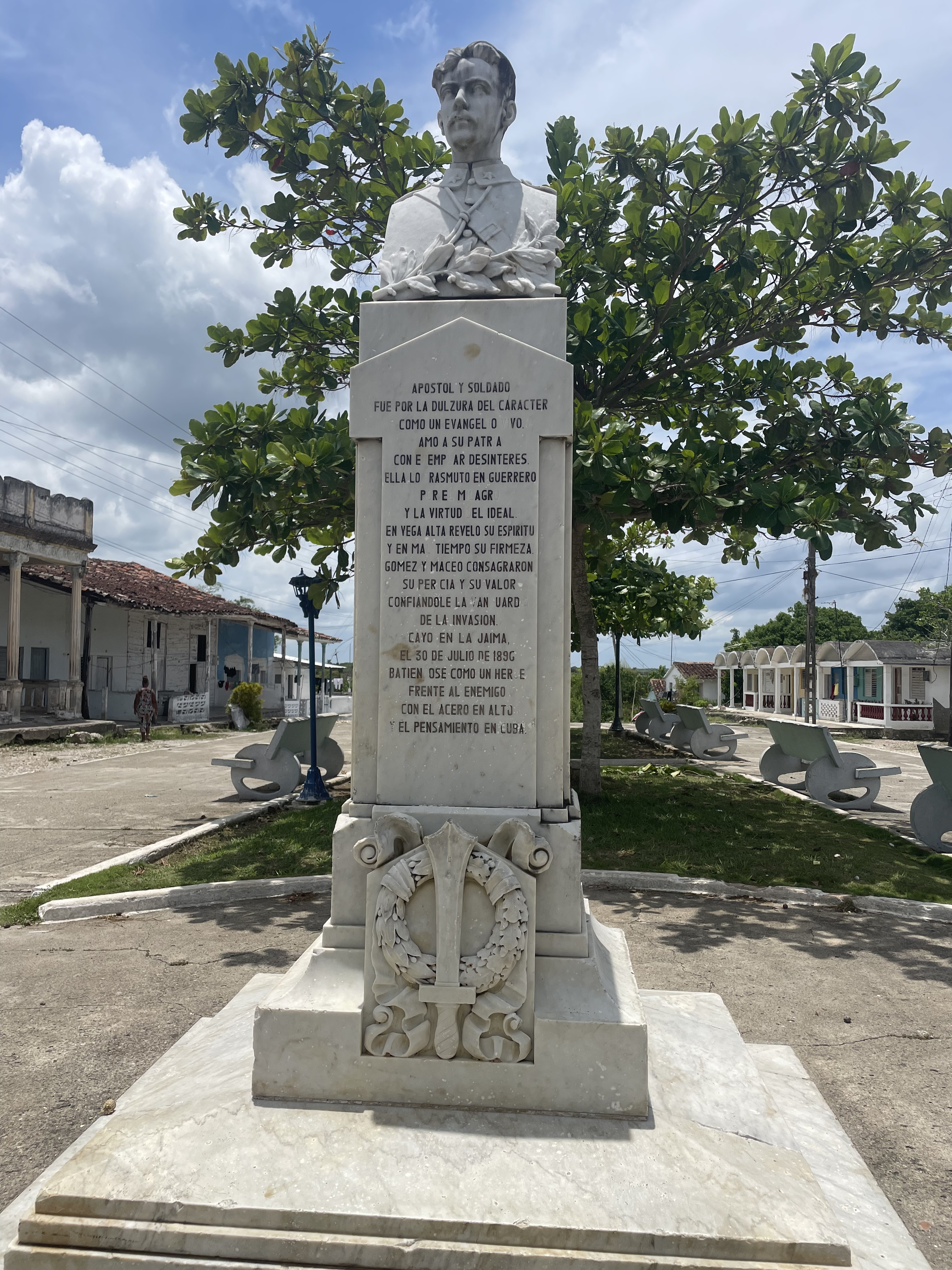
Statue of Juan Bruno Zayas

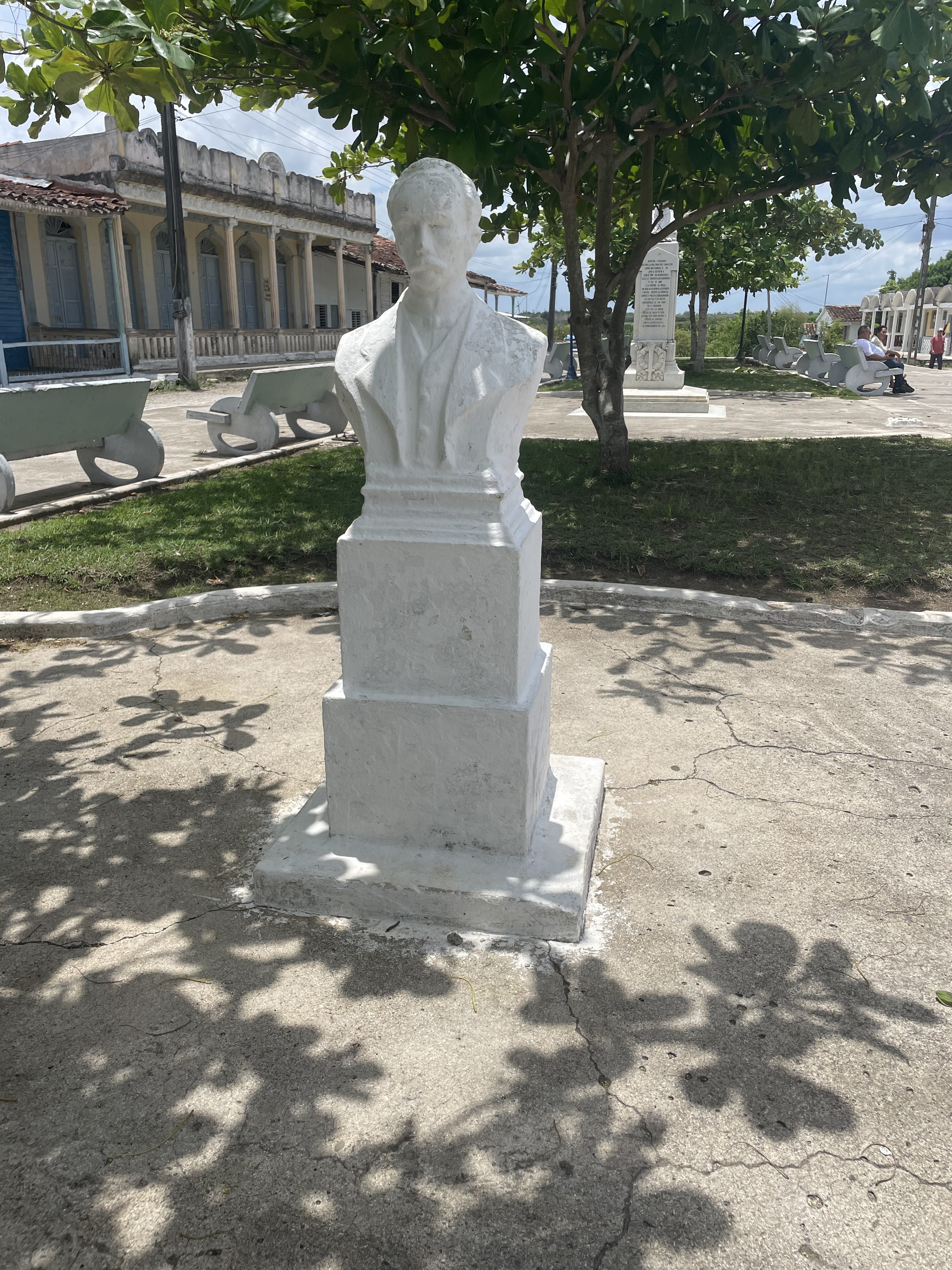
Statue of José Martí

The park contains a statue of José Martí at the front and a statue of Juan Bruno Zayas in the center.

=== El Cubano ===
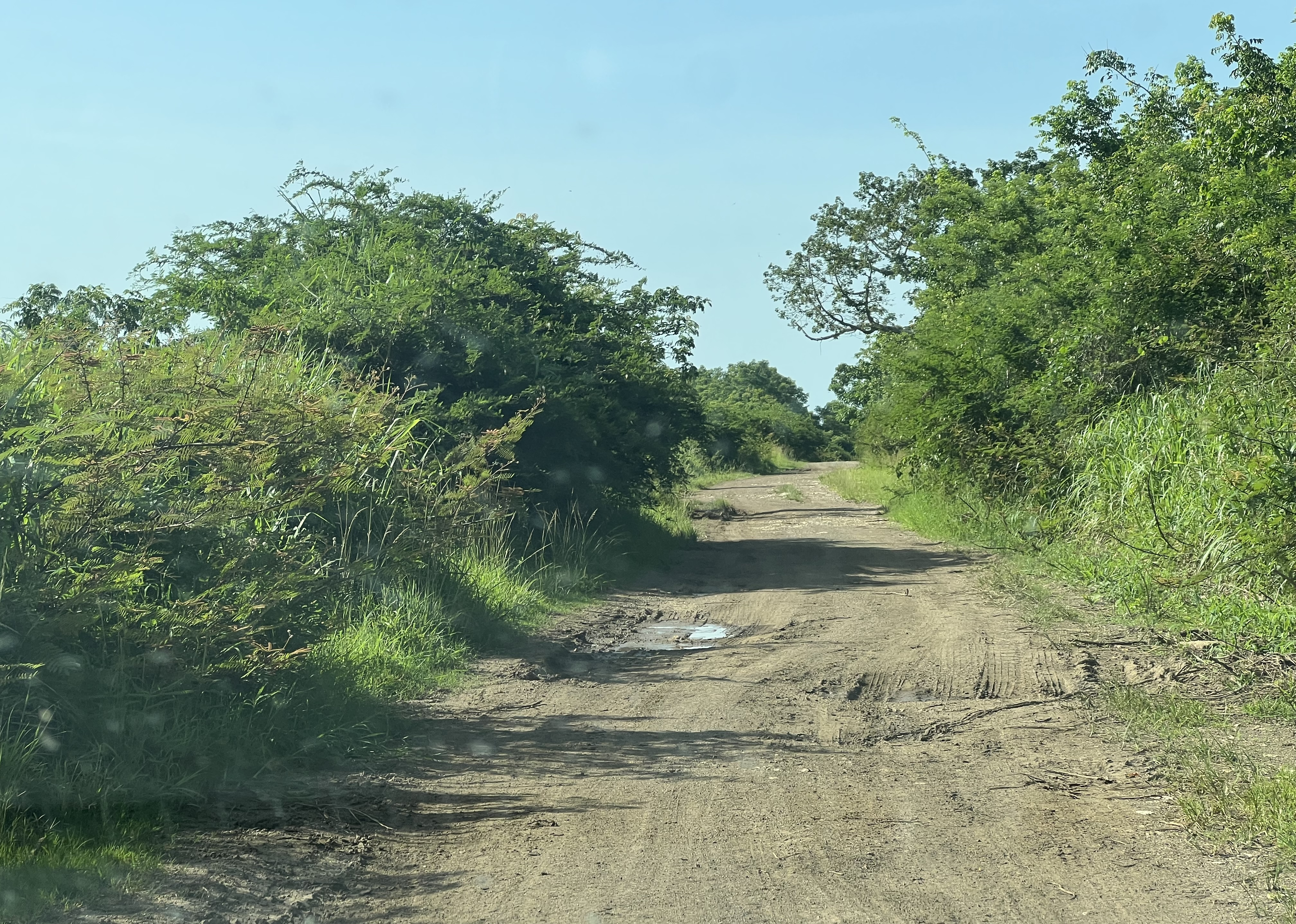
The Camino El Cubano, going to the hamlet

El Cubano is a hamlet (caseríos) in the ward of Vega Alta. El Cubano is located on the unpaved road of Camino del Cubano (Road of El Cubano), to the south is the settlement of Carmita, to the north is Vega Alta, to the west is the Sagua La Chica River and to the east is the Loma de Juan Ramón (hills of Juan Ramón) and after La Luz, which is connected by another unpaved road that passes through the sugar cane fields in the ward.

==== History ====
Three months after the Ten Years' War started fighting broke out in Remedios. On February 14, 1869, a Venezuelan named Salomé Hernández, who was working for Dos Hermanos de los Fusté Sugar Mill, got armed and took some slaves from the sugar mill. Salomé and her troops were aimed at burning sugar mills in El Cubano and other settlements nearby.

El Cubano used to be a part of the former barrio of Vega Alta, where it was called “Finca el Cubano” (Farm El Cubano).

In 2021, the Government of Camajuaní stated that it is pending to rearrange the Camino del Cubano in the Segundo Proceso de Rendición de cuenta del XVII Período de Mandato (Second Accountability Process of the XVII Mandate Period), but it appears to be the same as of 2023.

== Government ==
In Cuba, each ward has a list and number of Constituency Delegate (Delegado Circunscripción), the number are the numbers given to the municipality, Vega Alta's ward has: (as of April 5, 2023)

- Constituency Delegate #58 Isoel González Quintanal
- Constituency Delegate #59 Santos Rodríguez González
- Constituency Delegate #60 Rafael Gómez Rodriguez
- Constituency Delegate #61 Fidel Fernández Mederos (president of Vega Alta)
- Constituency Delegate #66 Luis Antonio Castillo Mesa

== Education ==
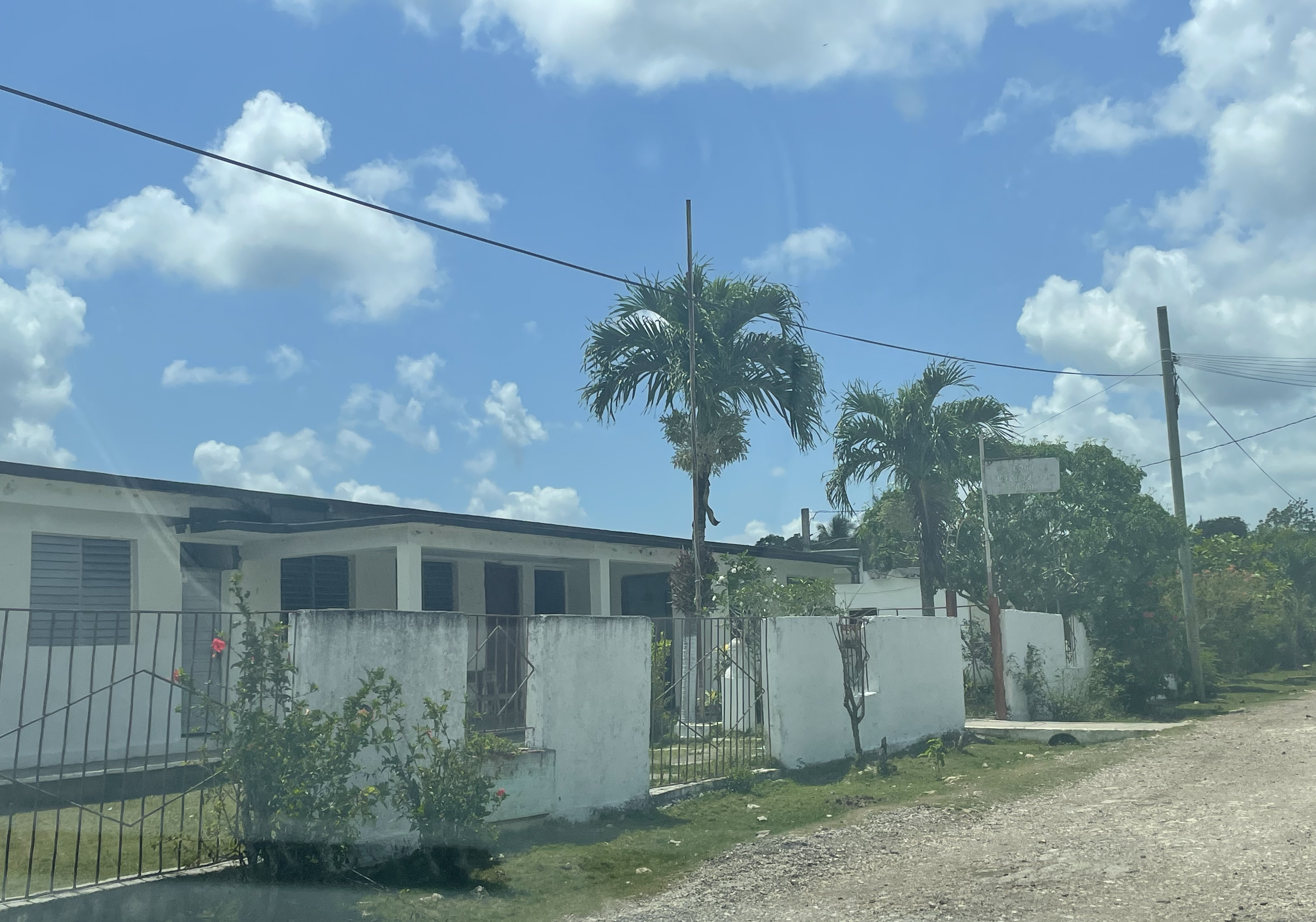
Wilfredo Cabrera Portal Secondary seen 2023

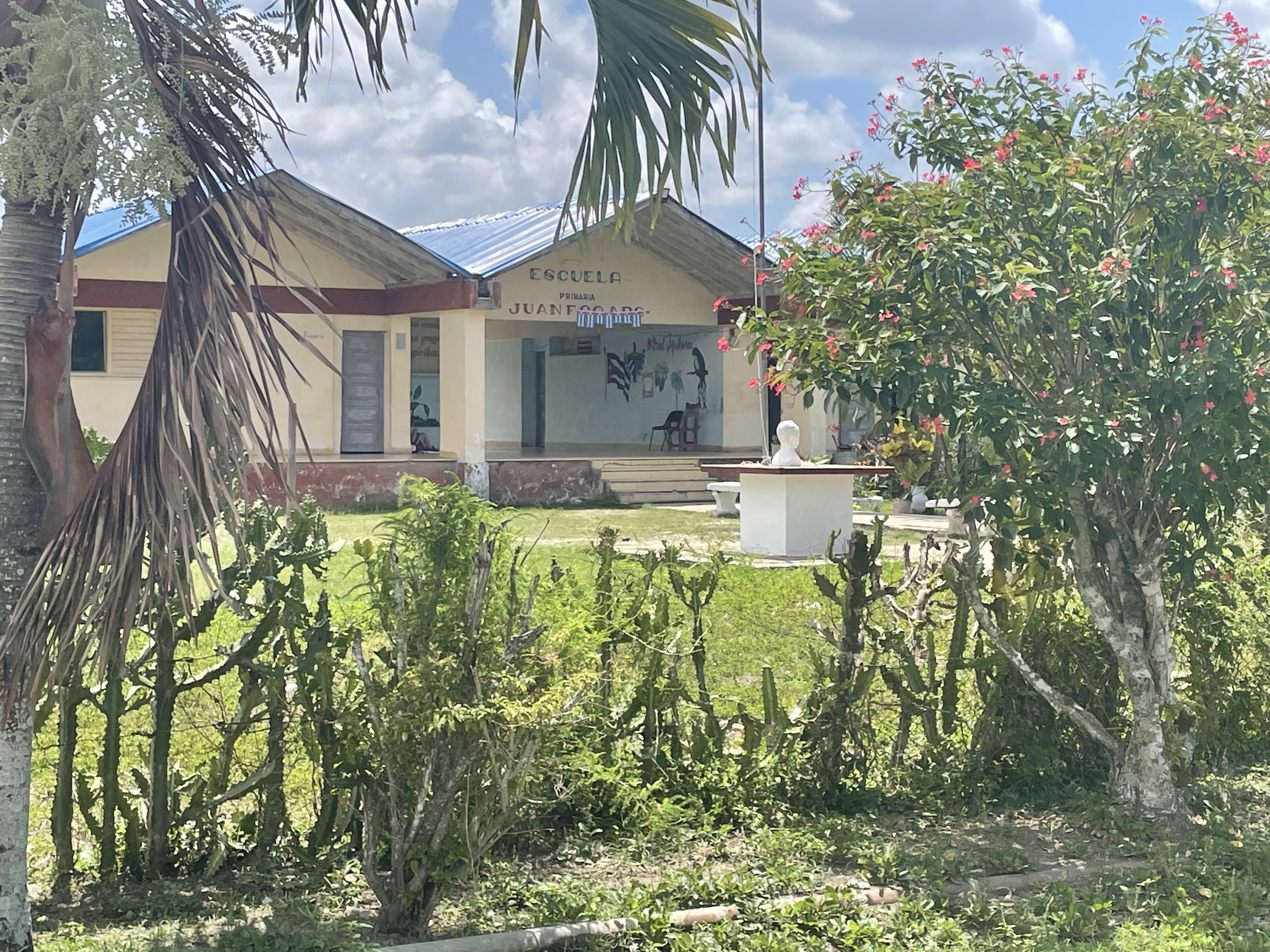
Juan Francisco Aro Primary seen in 2023

Schools in Vega Alta include:

- Benito Ramírez Rodríguez Primary in CPA Benito Ramírez
- Juan Francisco Aro Primary, on Calle Gloria
- Serafín Sánchez Valdivia Primary in Guerrero
- Boris Luis Santa Coloma Primary in La Lorenza
- Wilfredo Cabrera Portal Primary in El Rincón
- Wilfredo Cabrera Portal Secondary on Calle Gloria

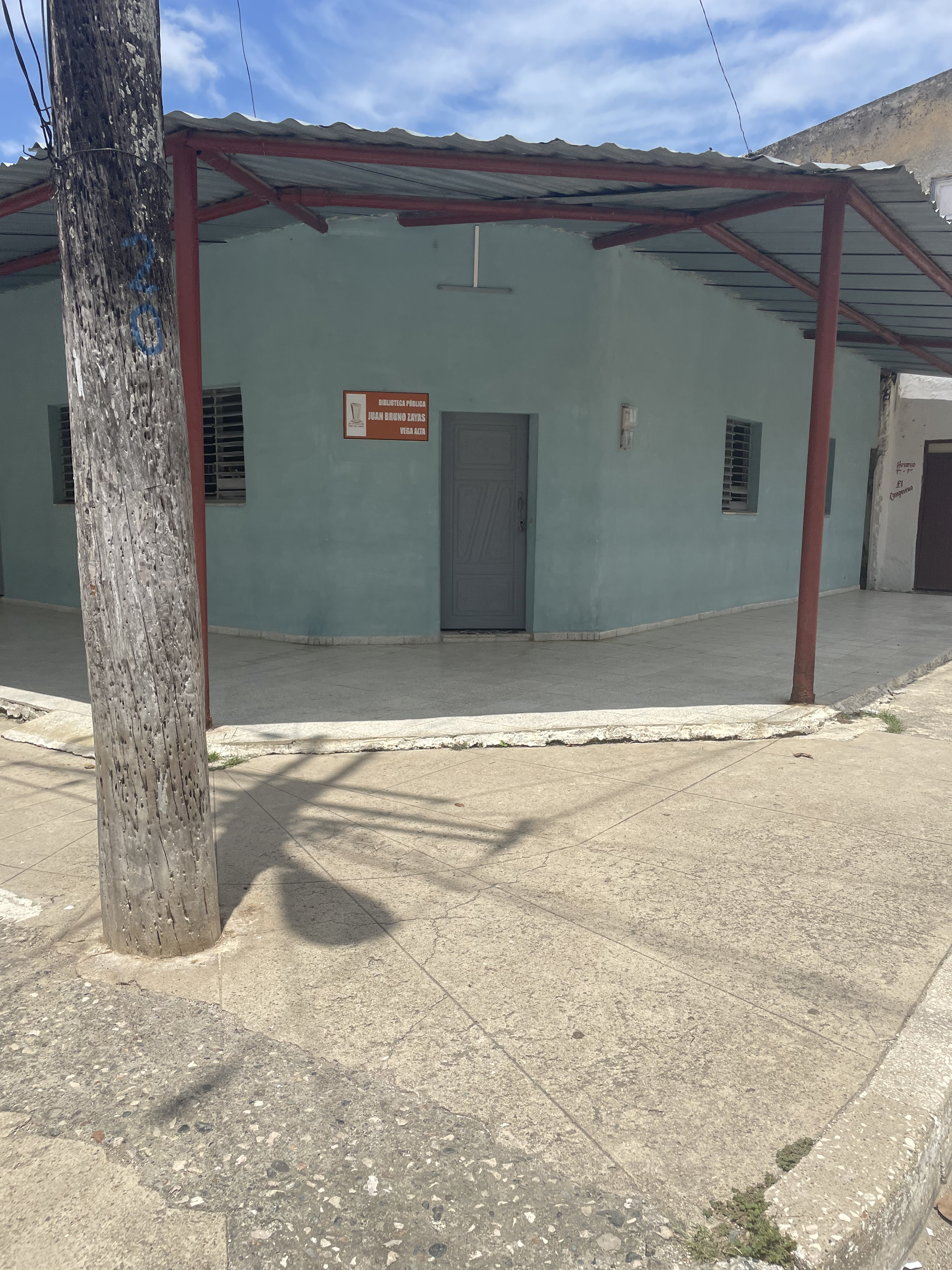
Juan Bruno Zayas Public Library

Vega Alta also has one public library being “Biblioteca publica Juan Bruno Zayas” or Juan Bruno Zayas Public Library in English. The library is also called the “Biblioteca Vegaltense”, or “Vegaltense Library”.

== History ==
=== Foundation ===
Vega Alta was founded in 1876.

It was named "Vega Alta" due to the avenues of the Sagua la Grande river which flooded the nearby land without ever reaching Vega Alta.

=== Juan Bruno Zayas ===
At the end of 1892, Juan Bruno Zayas moved to the town of Cifuentes, and began to practice there under the protection of Dr. Plazaola, a friend of the Zayas family. He later went to the town of La Quinta and finally settled in Vega Alta, where he settled permanently in partnership with his partner.

==== Attack of Vega Alta ====
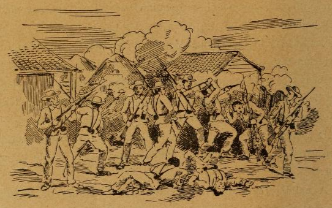
Photo of the battle

During the Cuban War of Independence on an afternoon, the ESDE of Camajuani notified General Luque, military governor of the Santa Clara Province, of a large insurgent party of Vega Alta that wanted to take over the town according to reports, the attack was the first “patriotic” uprising inSanta Clara Province against the "colonial government".

General Luque then ordered the administrator of the Sagua la Grande's railway to have a train ready in Camajuaní to lead troops to Vega Alta. He also ordered the military commander of the battle. They have sent a total of a column of 230 infantry men and some horses, under the command of lieutenant colonel Alfonso XITI, Mr. Velarde to the battle.

During the wait for the train to follow orders, insurgents advanced on Vega Alta and shot at the town, being stopped by a detachment of thirty men, under the command of the second lieutenant, garrisoned a fort (without defensive positions) that was in the town. Later the train arrived that took the troops of lieutenant colonel Senor Velarde to Tunicú and Canoa, where the troops dismounted, and marched towards Vega Alta, in anticipation that the enemy had cut the bridge that exists over the Sagua la Chica River, before reaching Tuinicú, and could have caused a catastrophe for the troops. The troops reached Vega Alta in the critical moment where the enemy was ready to enter the assault, with insurgents fleeing at first shots (mostly volunteers and fifths).

Fearing that there was an advanced party waiting for the train to attack, Luque ordered to stop the train and go attack the rebels. On both sides there was a fire, where they all went to the direction of El Salto. As they were leaving, another train going from Camajuani to Sagua when learning of what was happening, left Vega Alta back to Camajuani, which caused an alarm in the population.

Lieutenant colonel military commander of Remedios, Mr. Devós, arrived shortly after to Camajuani, and when finding out what was happening, he ordered all the volunteer force that he gathered and reconcentrated immediately go to the freight train, preceded by a scanning machine of the Caibarién line, to Vega Alta. Upon his arrival he found the column of Lieutenant Colonel Señor Velarde, who informed him of the dispersion and flight of the enemy and he returned to Camajuaní on the same train. Mr. Velarde then go to find the enemy.

The parties that have attacked Vega Alta are said to have been commanded by Pole Roloff who is accompanied by the leaders Serafín Sánchez and Ramón Cabrera (commander), the latter from the United States. With over 1,000 people fighting with the rebels.

After Juan Bruno Zayas and the rebels left Vega Alta, the first town he encountered was Guerrero.

=== Barrio of Vega Alta ===
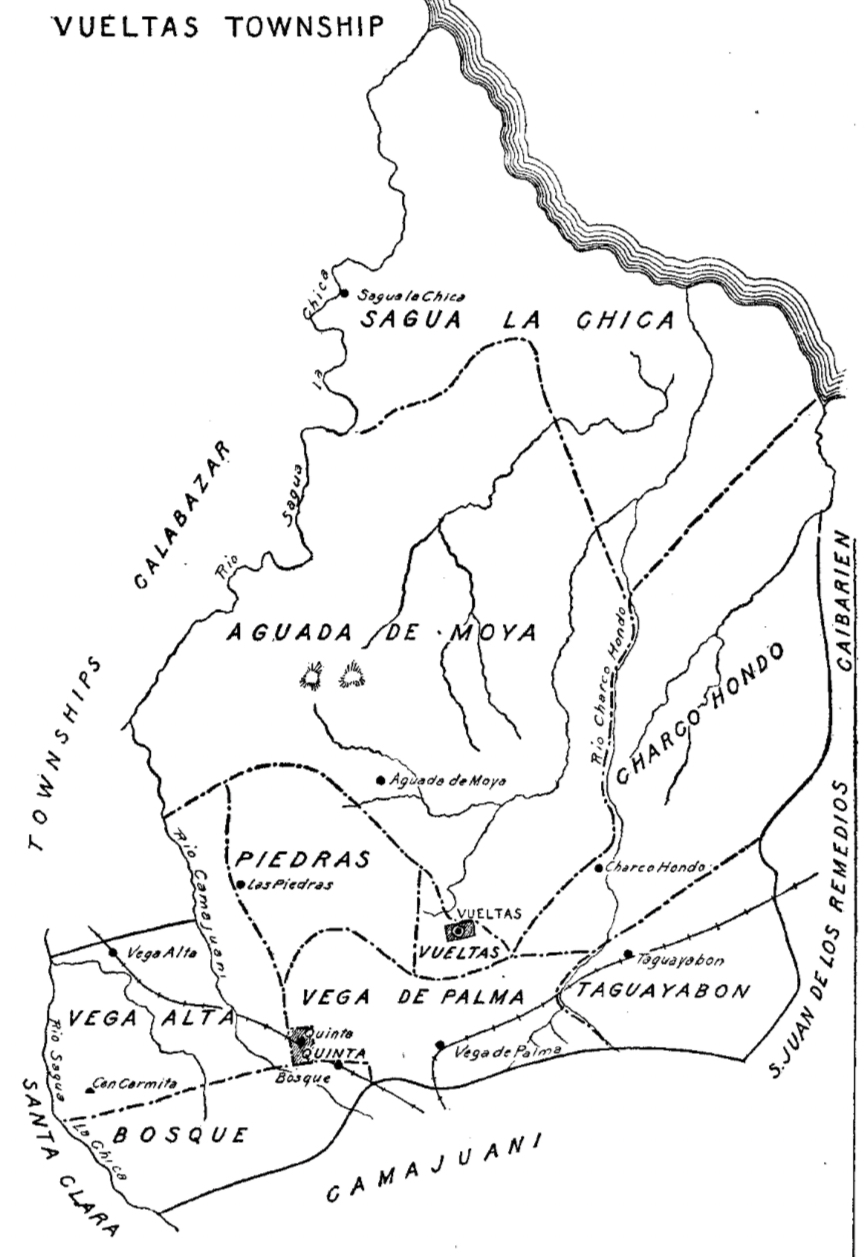
Map of the relative location of barrios of Vueltas in 1909, with the Carmita Sugar Mill being seen in the barrio of Vega Alta, labeled as "Cen. Carmita"

Until 1976 Vega Alta was a barrio of the former San Antonio de las Vueltas Municipality. Settlements that used to be a part of the barrio of Vega Alta were Vega Alta (main town), El Cubano, La Luz, Luis Arcos Bergens (called Carmita at the time), and more.

The barrio included the hills (lomas) and L.V. of Loma Sinaloa, LV El Mogote, LV Loma El Hacha, LV El Hoyón, Loma Sola, and LV La Sierra.

== Transportation ==
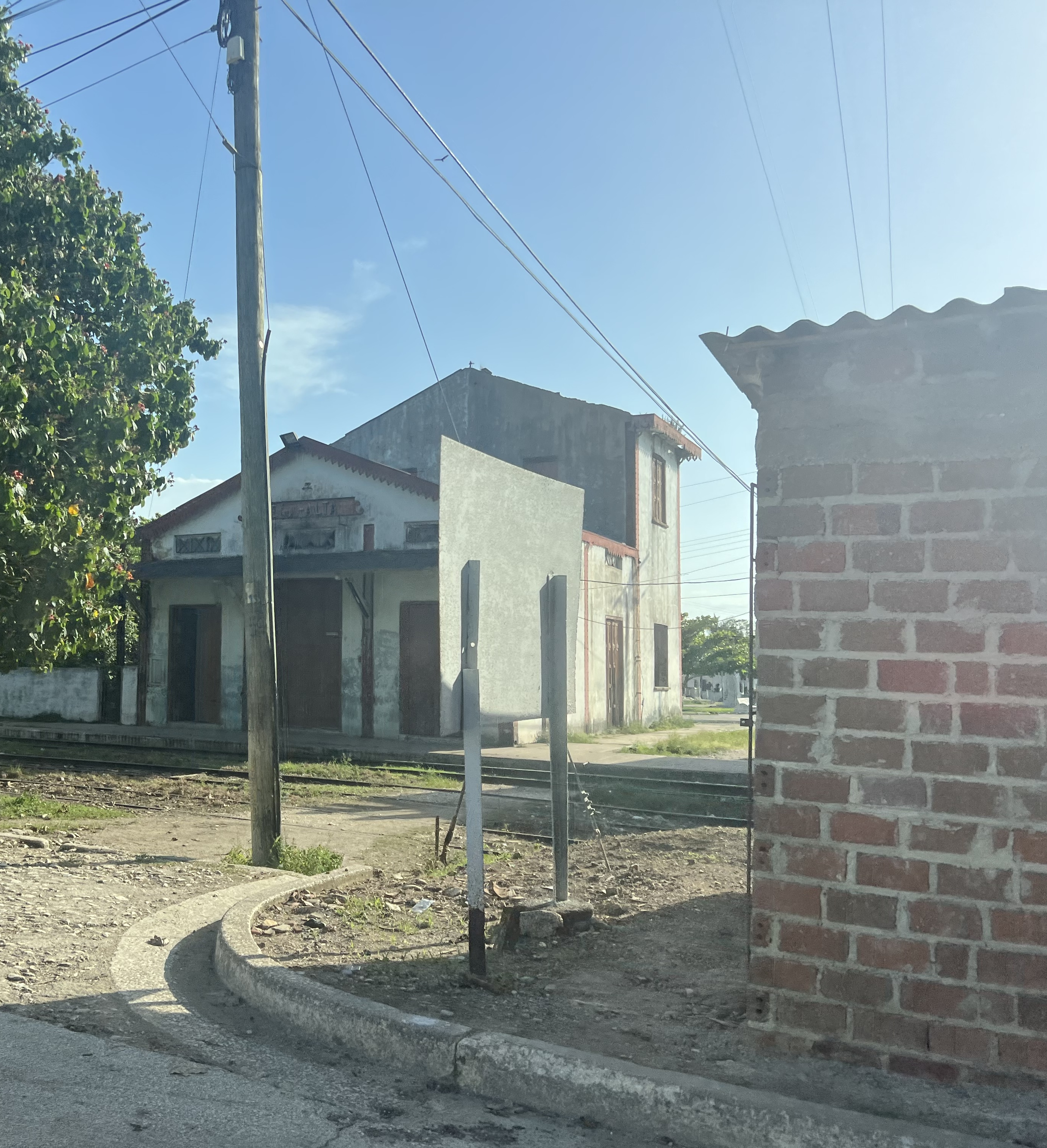
The front of the railway station of Vega Alta

Vega Alta is on a rail line starting in Santa Clara, going to Crucero Margot, to Luis Arcos Bergnes, Vega Alta, Canoa, Tuinicu, Constancia, Encrucijada, Mata, El Vaquerito, Aguada la Piedra, Cifuentes, San Diego del Valle, Conyedo, and finally back to Santa Clara.

There two trains of the Vega Alta rail station, one going from Camajuani to Vega Alta and one going from Vega Alta to Santa Clara.

The state public transportation in Camajuaní has a route going from Camajuaní to Vega Alta.

The current railway station is not in use, with it formerly being a home at one point. The Government of Camajuaní stated that it is pending to fix the roof of the building, under the Second Accountability Process of the XVII Mandate Period.

== Demographics ==
Historical population
- 1909: 2500
- 1919: 3462
- 1931: 4147
- 1943: 4732
- 2002: 1149
- 2009: 1149
- 2012: 1061

== Economy ==
According at the DMPF (Departamento de control de la Dirección Municipal de Planificación Física or Management Control Department Municipal Physical Planning in English) of Camajuaní, Vega Alta is a settlement linked to sources of employment or economic development.

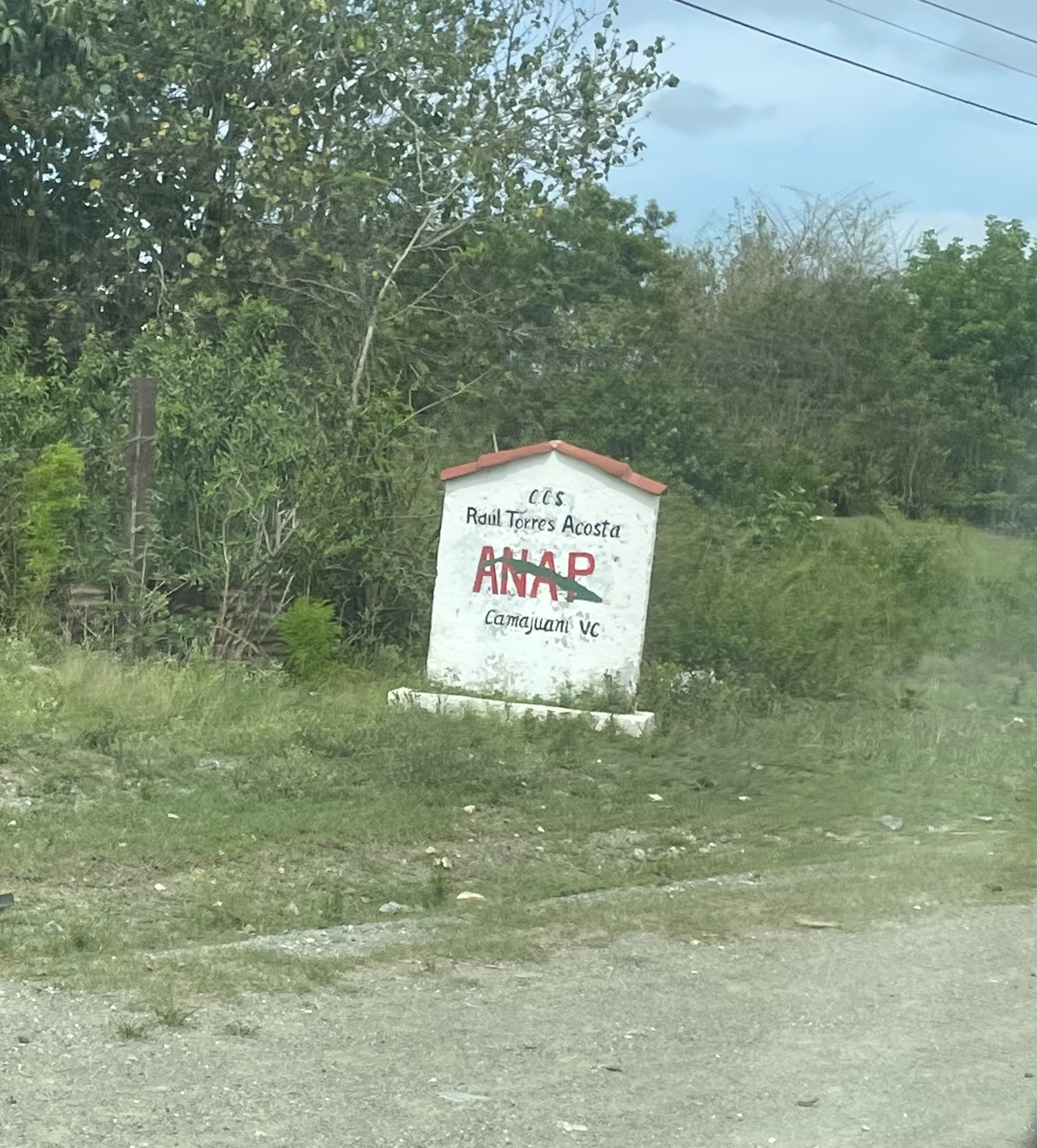
CCS Raúl Torres Acosta sign

Vega Alta has the CCS - which are farmlands home to many private farms with one leader governing the CCS and with most of the products going to the national and local governments - of:

- CCS Raúl Torres Acosta in La Lebisa
- CCS Mártires de Vueltas in Guerrero.

It has the CPA of:

- CPA Benito Ramirez, in the settlement with the same name

== Culture ==
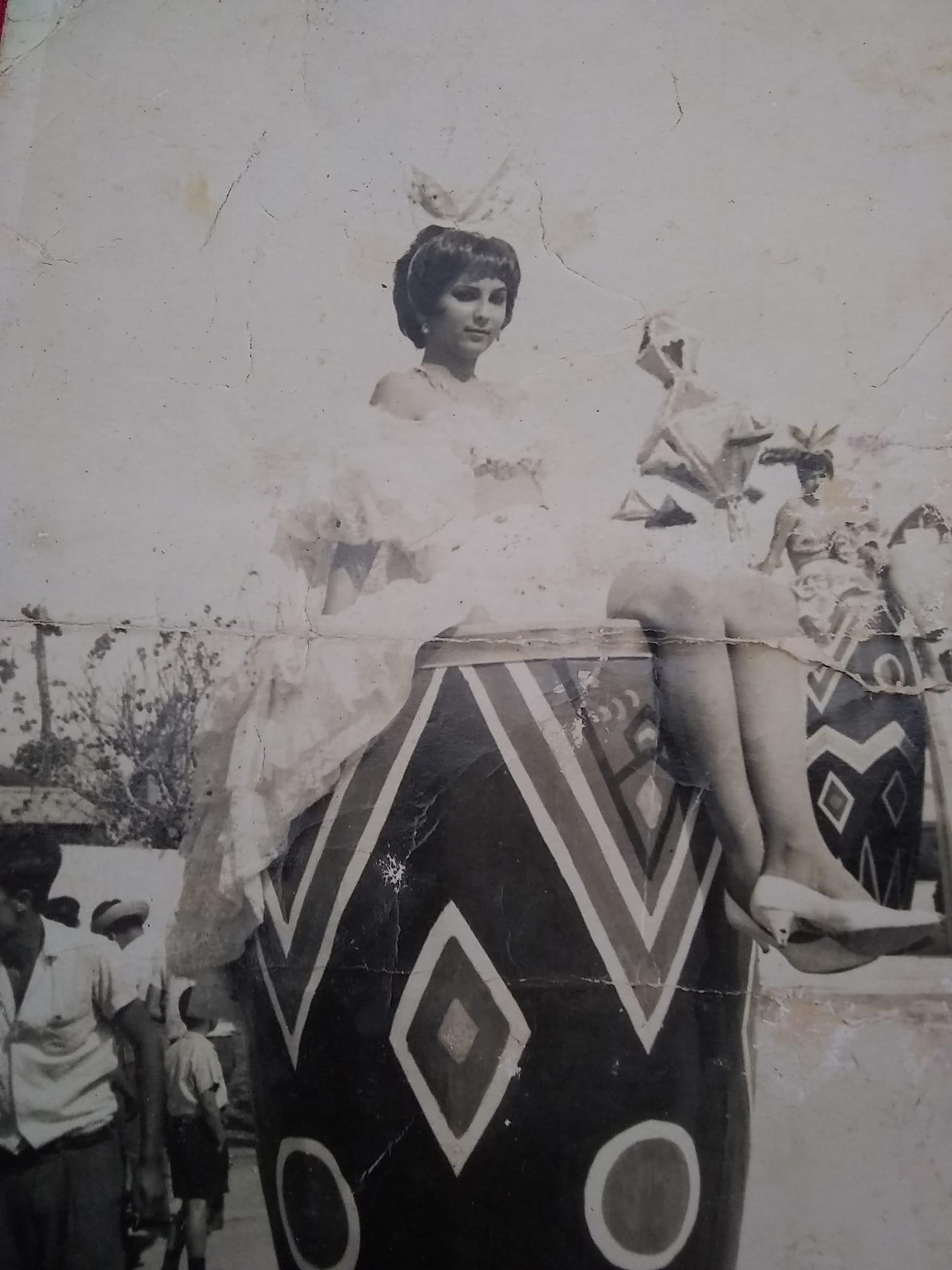
Women on a carriage in the 1965 parrandas of Vega Alta

Vega Alta celebrates the Parrandas, a celebration throughout central Cuba, every year, on 25 April.

== Resources ==
Vega Alta, Sagua la Chica, and Crecencio Valdés are the only towns in Camajuani that make clay.

Vega Alta has the collections of Urocoptis villarensis, also known as Centralia villarensis, of the Urocoptidae family, of the Carnegie Museum of Natural History are one in the main town of Vega Alta found in 1931, and one in La Sinaloa. Of the Field Museum of Natural History Invertebrates it has 2 in the main town and 9 in La Sinaloa. Of the Florida Museum of Natural History it has one in Loma Sinaloa and 2 in Loma Murcielagos. Of the Museum of Comparative Zoology of Harvard it has 3 in Rincon, 30 in Loma Murcielagos, 10 in El Hacha, 13 in Vereda del Abra, 50 in La Sinaloa, 20 in Loma Sinaloa, 3 in El Guajen, and 13 in Loma Sola. Of the Illinois Natural History Survey it has 2 in the main town. Of the SDNHM Marine Invertebrate Collection it has 5 in the main town and 4 in Loma La Sinaloa.

== Sports ==
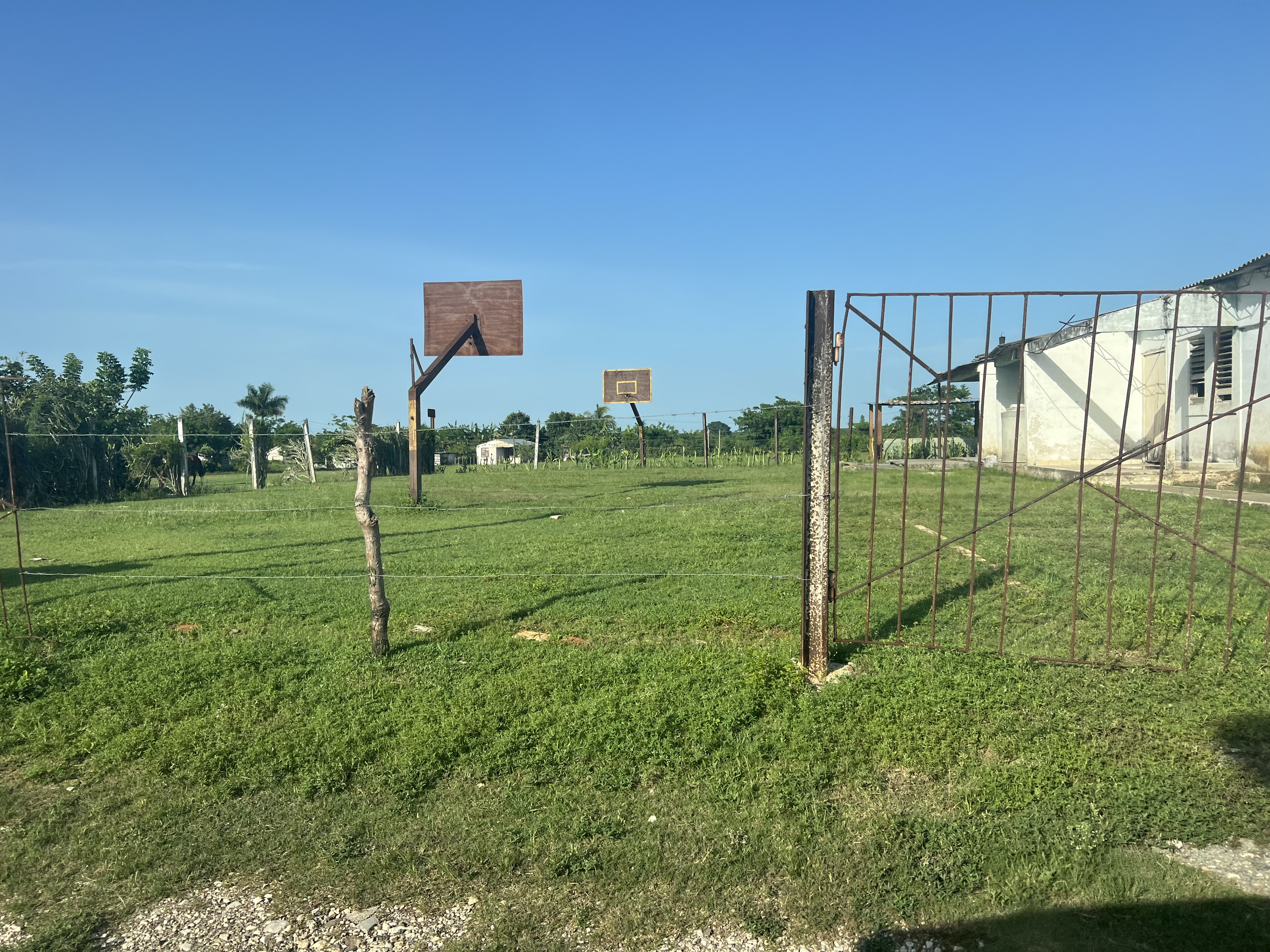
the basketball field of Vega Alta

Vega Alta has 3 sports fields, 1 volleyball and 1 basketball field owned by the Secondary and Primary schools, and one baseball/kickball field which is public.

== See also ==
- La Quinta, Cuba
- José María Pérez, Cuba
- Chorrerón, Cuba
