= Quinta =

Quinta may refer to:

- Quinta (estate) in Portugal
- Quinta (musician), British multi-instrumentalist
- In medieval music theory, alternative term for diapente (perfect fifth)
- Quinta (skipper), genus of butterflies
- Claudia Quinta, Roman matron
- Quintus (vocal music), fifth voice in polyphony
- Quinta Brunson, writer and comedian
- shorthand for Biblia Hebraica Quinta, standard Hebrew Bible text
- Quinta, Cuba an alternative name for La Quinta, Cuba
- Quinta Market a market located in Quiapo, Manila

== See also ==
- Tropical Cyclone Quinta, a typhoon name used in The Philippines by PAGASA
- La Quinta (disambiguation)
- Quinta da Beloura, an affluent gated community and golf resort located in Linhó, Sintra, on the Portuguese Riviera
- Quinta Normal, Chile
- Quinta Grande, Portugal
