= Piedra (Camajuaní) =

Settlement in Cuba

- Settlement
- CPA "Rubén Martínez Villena"
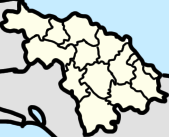
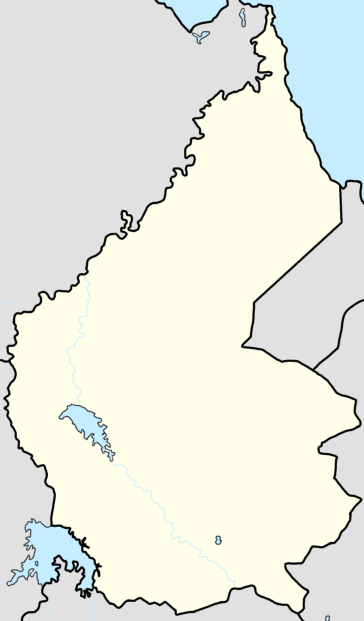
- Location within Cuba Location within Villa Clara Province Location within Camajuaní
- Coordinates: 22°31′42″N 79°44′48″W
- Country: Cuba
- Province: Villa Clara
- Municipality: Camajuani
- Ward: La Quinta

Population
  - Total: 198

Piedra, also known as Piedras, is a settlement made up of the CPA Rubén Martínez Villena in the ward of La Quinta, Cuba.

== Geography ==
Piedra lies in a natural forest area.

== History ==
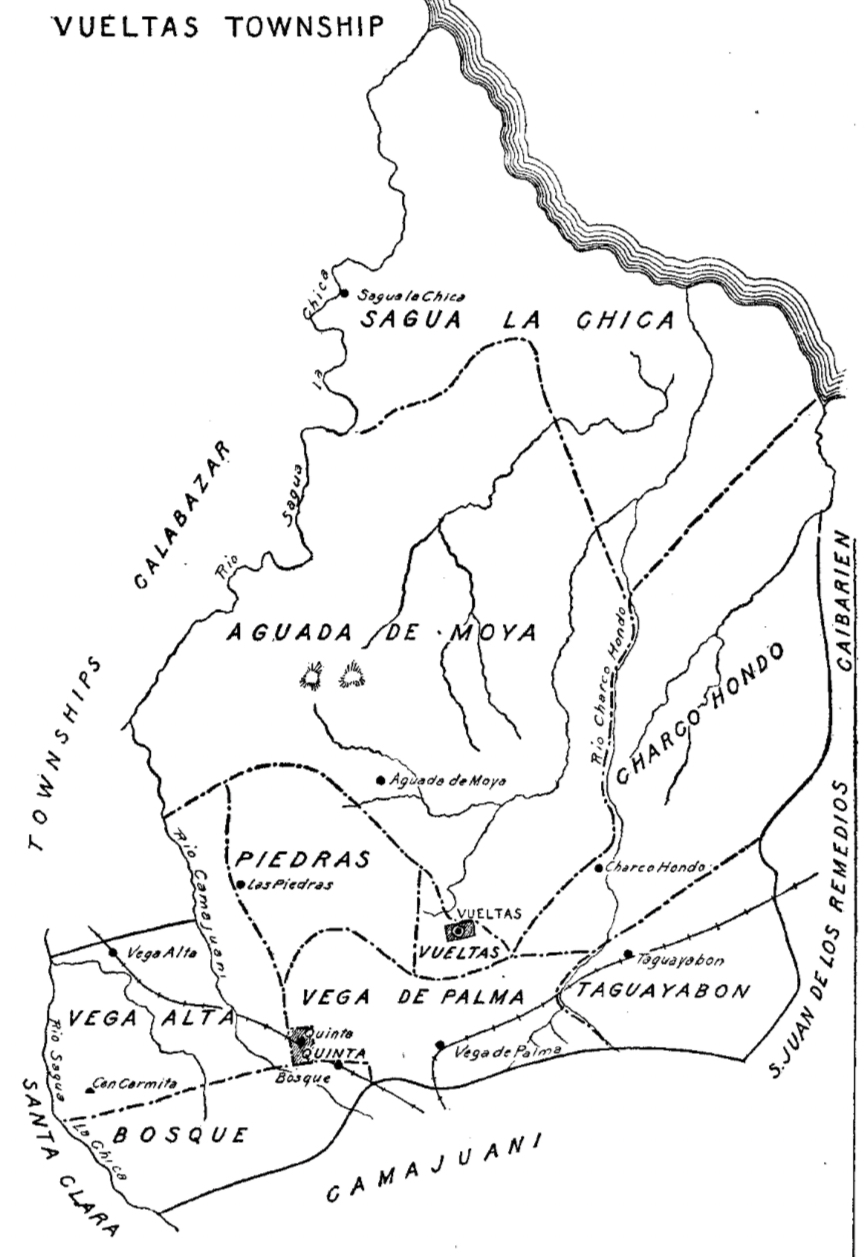
Map of Barrios of Vueltas in 1909

Until 1976, Piedra was a barrio of San Antonio de las Vueltas.

== Economy ==
According at the DMPF (Departamento de control de la Dirección Municipal de Planificación Física or Management Control Department Municipal Physical Planning in English) of Camajuani, Piedra is a settlement linked to sources of employment or economic development.

== Education ==
Pierda has one school being "Abel Roig Santana" Primary School.
