= Piedra (Mexican cuisine) =

Mexican stuffed corn dumpling

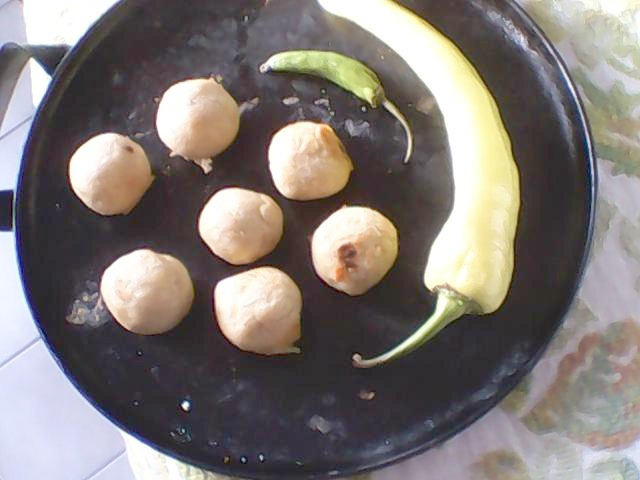
Piedras

Piedra or tuniche is a Mexican dish. It consists of a corn dumpling with some sort of stuffing, which is fried until crunchy consistency. Piedras are commonly accompanied with pink onion, chopped lettuce and guacamole.
