= La Luz, Cuba =

La Luz, Cuba La Luz
- Village
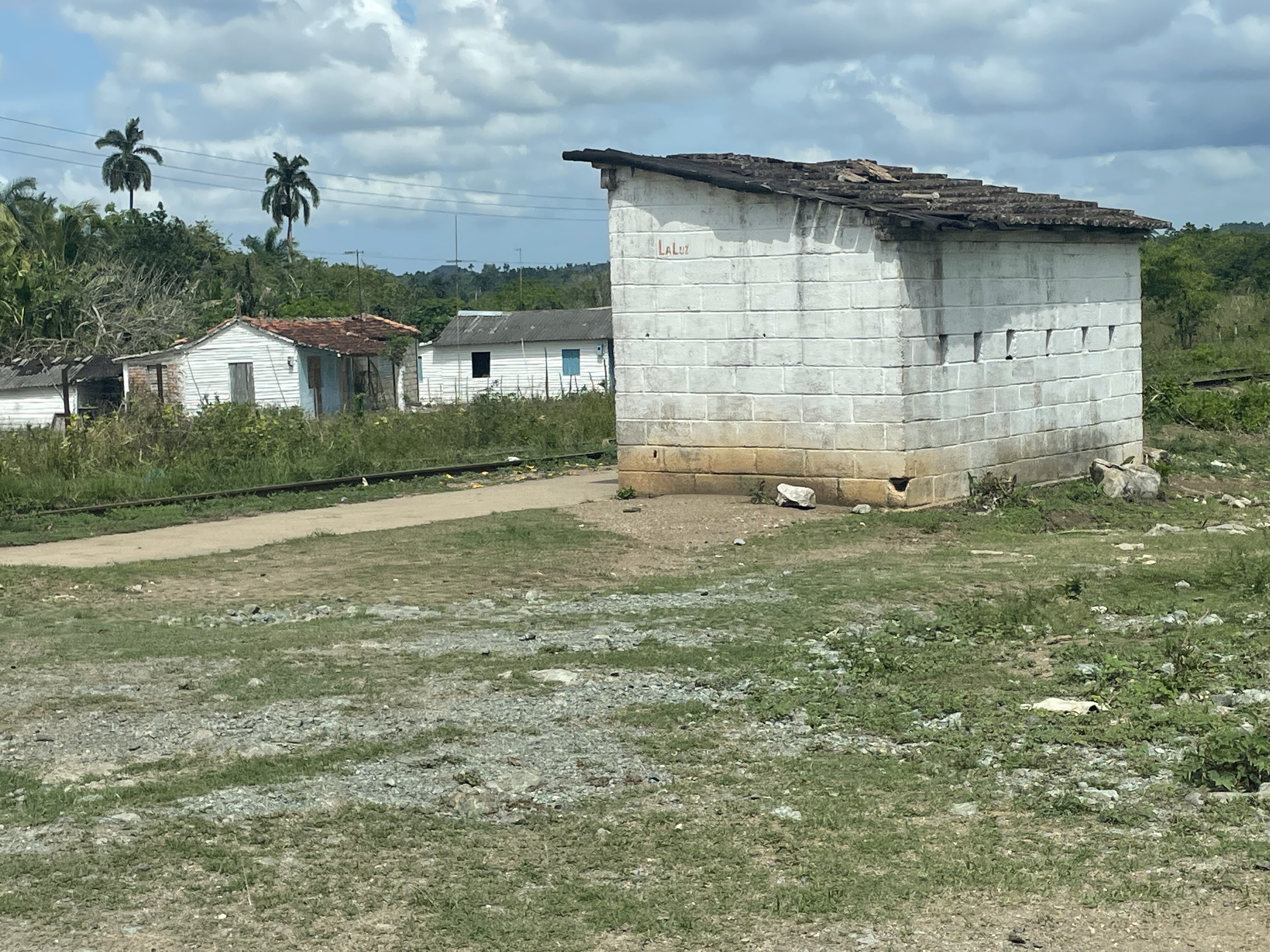
- Railway stop in La Luz of the Ramal Cifuentes-Camajuaní railway

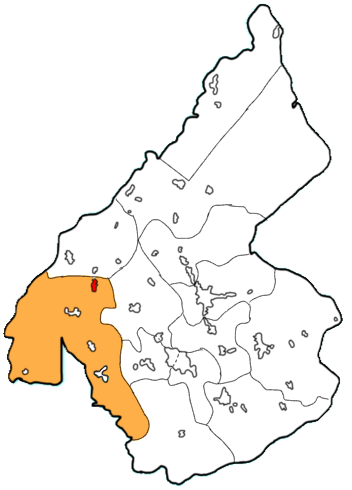
- Map of La Luz (red) in Luis Arcos Bergnes (orange) in Camajuani.

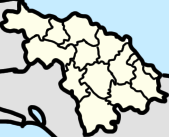
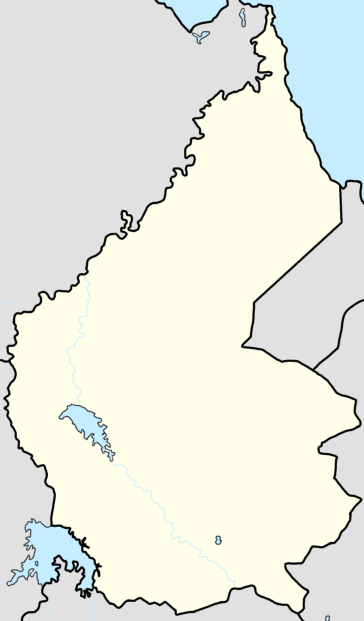
- Location within Cuba Location within Villa Clara Province Location within Camajuaní
- Coordinates: 22°31′31″N 79°47′52″W
- Country: Cuba
- Province: Villa Clara
- Municipality: Camajuaní
- Ward: Luis Arcos Bergnes
- First Settled: 1703
- Elevation: 59 m (194 ft)

Population
  - Total: 733
- Postal code: 52500

La Luz is a small town of 733 people in the ward of Luis Arcos Bergnes, Camajuaní, Villa Clara, Cuba. Its neighboring towns are El Cubano (also known as La Flora), Carmita, Vega Alta, San Juan, Guerrero, and Canoa. Its estimated sea level is 7 meters above sea level

== Education ==
In La Luz there is one school, with it being

- Delfín Sen Cedré Primary

== Economy ==
According at the DMPF (Departamento de control de la Dirección Municipal de Planificación Física or Management Control Department Municipal Physical Planning in English) of Camajuani, La Luz is a settlement not linked to any source of an economic or job development but still are maintained.

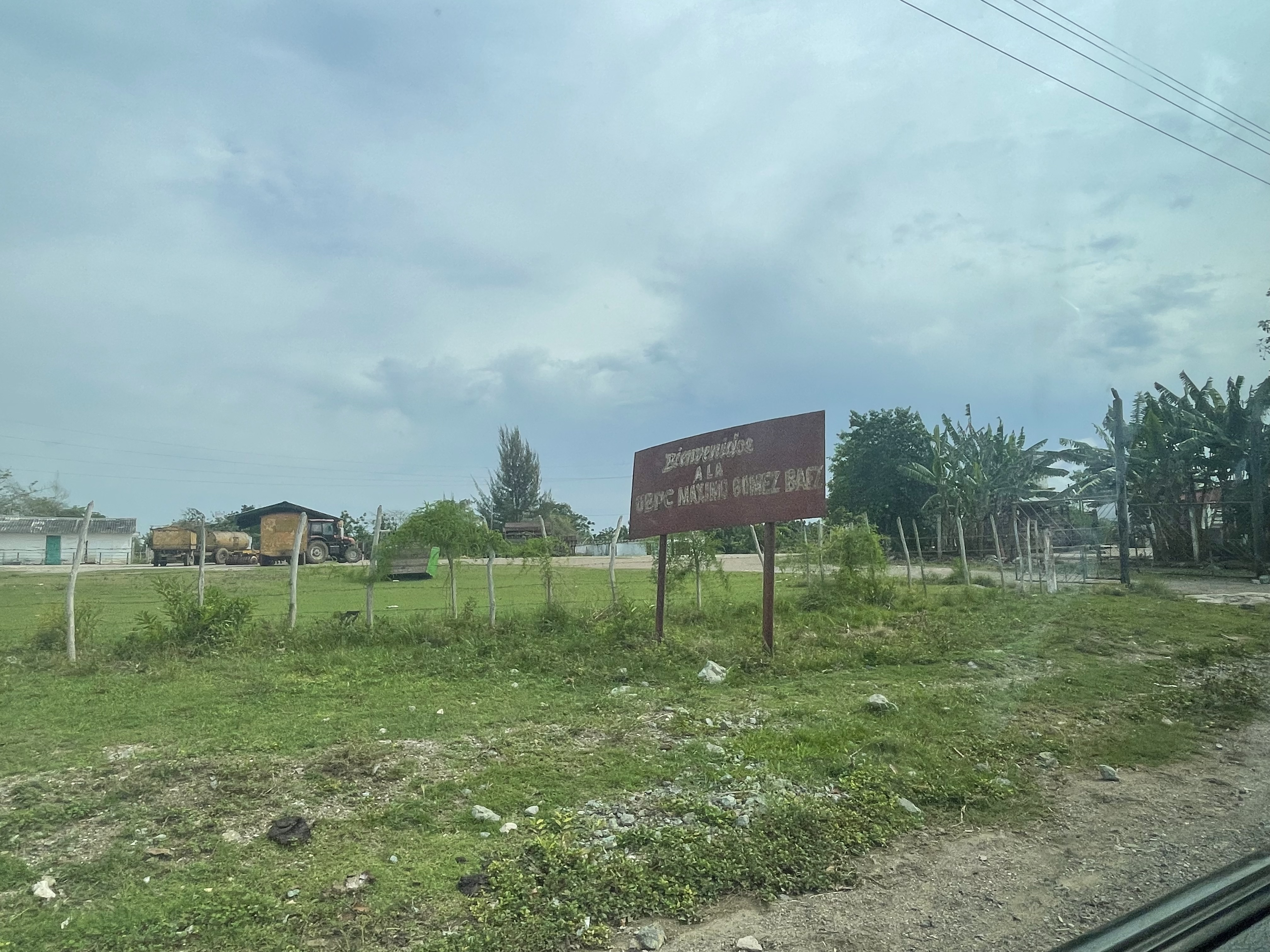
UBPC Máximo Gómez Báez

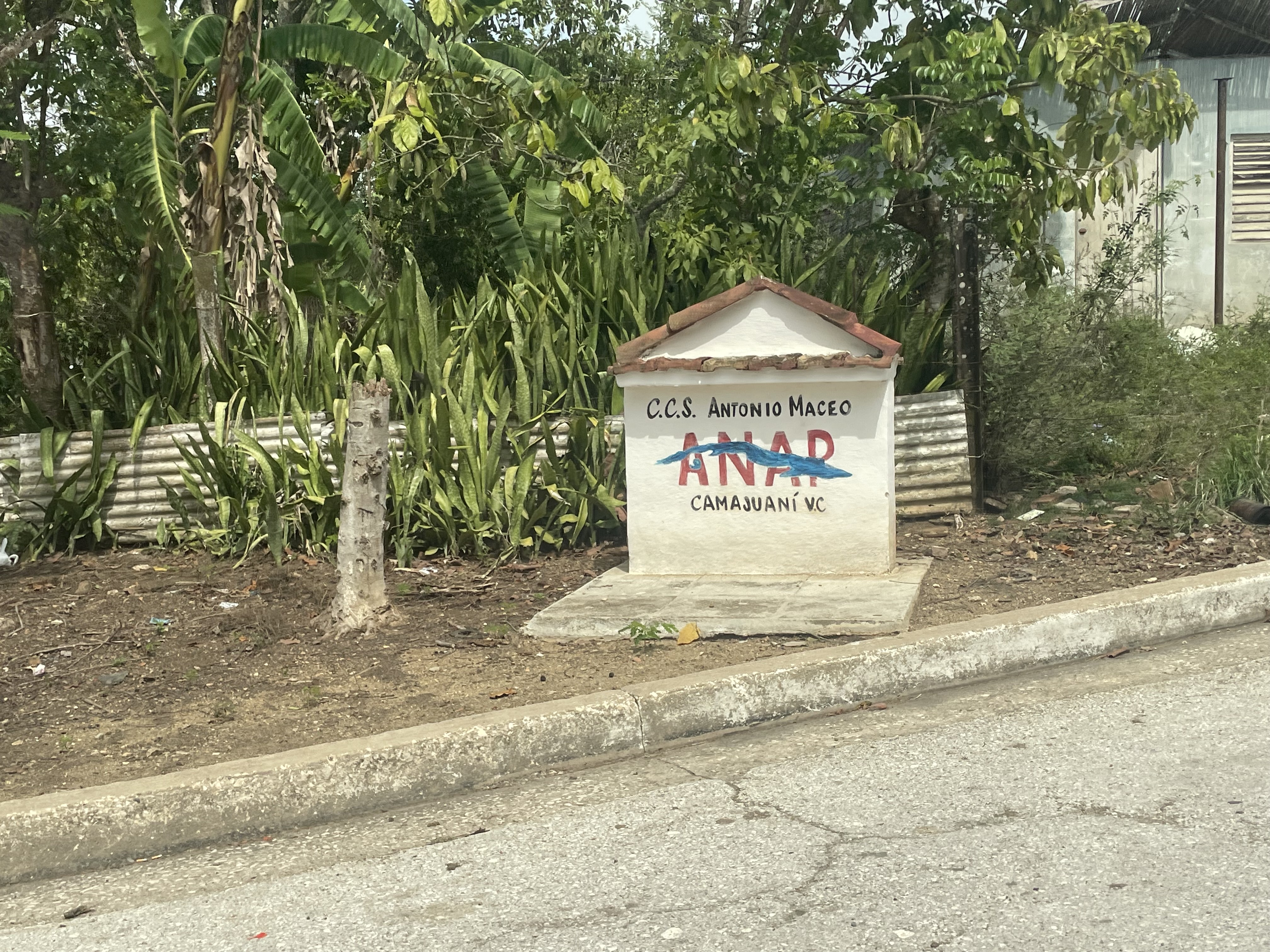
CCS Antonio Maceo

La Luz has a mostly agricultural economy, which it having a garlic plantation, UBPC “Máximo Gómez”, CCS “Antonio Maceo”, and other farms and plantations nearby.

== Sports ==
In the town there is one sports club, with it being the Peña CCS Orestes Acosta.

== History ==
La Luz used to be a part of the former Barrio of Vega Alta, in the former municipality of Vueltas. At that time La Luz was called “Finca Luz” or “Luz Farm”.

== See also ==
- Santa Clara, Cuba
- Aguada de Moya, Cuba
