= La Quinta, Cuba =

La Quinta
- Urban settlement
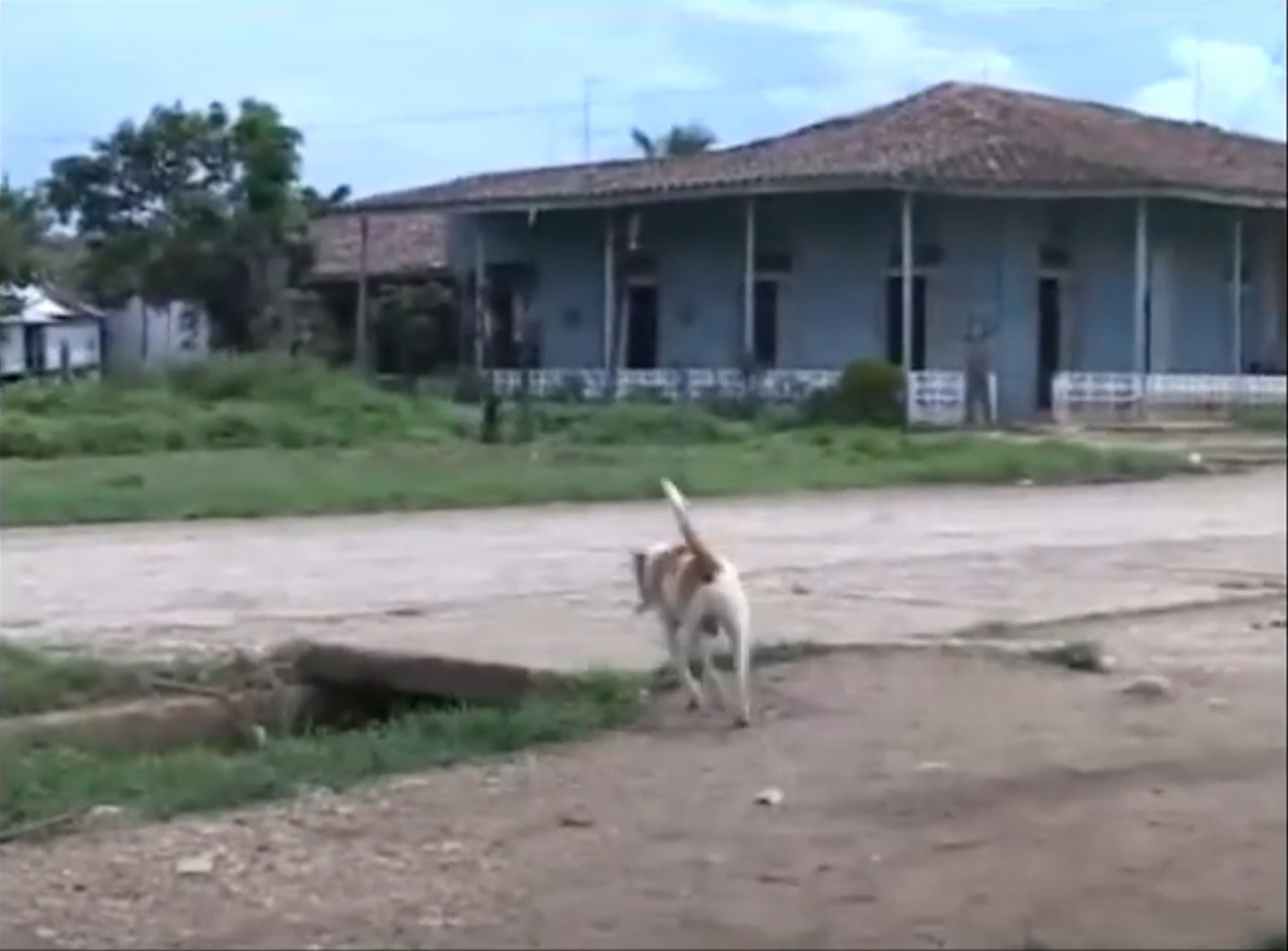
- Main Street of La Quinta

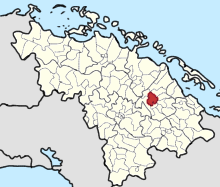
- Former ward of La Quinta in Villa Clara Province

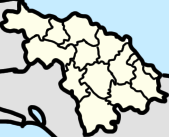
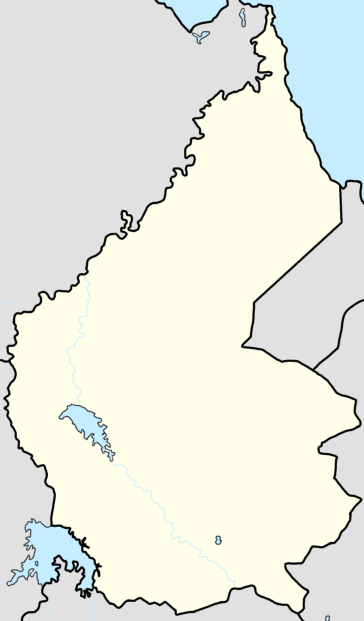
- Location within Cuba Location within Villa Clara Province Location within Camajuaní
- Coordinates: 22°30′30″N 79°45′46″W
- Country: Cuba
- Province: Villa Clara
- Municipality: Camajuaní
- Founded: 1875

Area
  - Land: 0.3153 km^{2} (0.1217 sq mi)

Population (2012 Census)
  - Total: 1,026
  - Density: 3,254/km^{2} (8,430/sq mi)

La Quinta, simply known as Quinta, is an urban settlement home of 1,026 in Camajuani, Cuba. It is located north of the settlement of El Bosque and the municipal seat of Camajuaní.

== History ==
La Quinta was founded in 1875, as a part of the former municipality of San Antonio de las Vueltas.

Juan Bruno Zayas, a general in the Cuban war of Independence lived shortly in La Quinta and later Vega Alta.

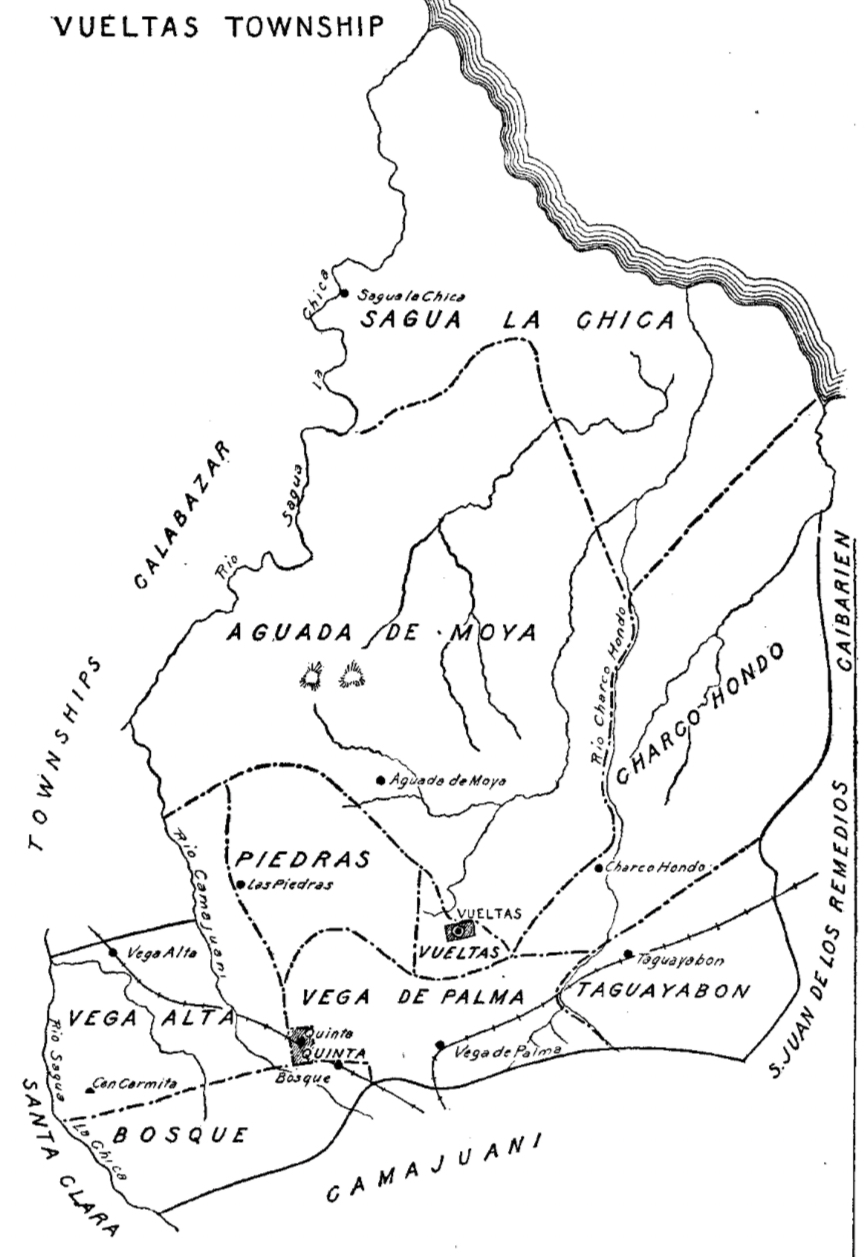
Map of Barrios of Vueltas in 1909

Until 1976 La Quinta was a former barrio of the Vueltas Municipality.

In 1992, Caledonia Valdés became the president of the former ward until 1998, where he switched to a president of Camajuaní II.

== Education ==
La Quinta has one school, which is:

- Andrés Cuevas Primary

== Economy ==
According at the DMPF (Departamento de control de la Dirección Municipal de Planificación Física or Management Control Department Municipal Physical Planning in English) of Camajuani, La Quinta is a settlement linked to sources of employment or economic development.

The Provincial Tobacco Company La Estrella has territory in La Quinta, Camajuani, Aguada de Moya, San Antonio de las Vueltas, and Taguayabón.

== Transport ==
La Quinta is located on the paved road, Vial La Quinta, being the only paved road of the town, which ends in La Quinta, and links it to the south with El Bosque and starts in Camajuaní at the Carretera de Camajuaní. The other 2 semi–major unpaved roads link the town to the Embalse La Quinta to the west, and Vueltas and the Circuito Norte to the east.

La Quinta is also located on the Línea Norte railway line, with train routes Morón–Santa Clara and Camajuaní–Vega Alta stopping in La Quinta.

== Infrastructure ==
In La Quinta, Taguayabón, San Antonio de las Vueltas, and Vega de Palma there are a combined total of 13 Municipal Collection Establishment squares. There is also one Twisted Factory in La Quinta and an egg hatchery, with the person owning the egg hatchery being Carlos Quintanal Feito.

== See also ==
- La Luz, Cuba
- Canoa, Cuba
