= Juan Bruno Zayas =

Cuban military leader and doctor

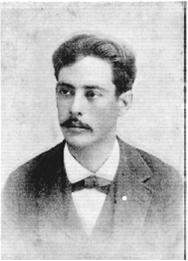
- Juan Bruno Zayas, photo taken in Sagua la Grande, before arriving in Vega Alta.
- Born: June 8, 1867; Havana, La Habana Province, Cuba
- Died: July 30, 1896 (aged 29); Havana, La Habana Province, Cuba
- Military career
- Allegiance: Cuba
- Branch: Cuban Revolutionary Army
- Service years: 1895 – 1896
- Rank: Lieutenant Colonel
- Conflicts: Cuban War of Independence

Juan Bruno Zayas Alfonso (June 8th, 1867 - July 30th, 1896) was a Cuban military leader and doctor of the Cuban War of Independence.

== Biography ==
=== Early years and medical career ===
Zayas was born on June 8, 1867, in Havana. His father, Dr. José María de Zayas y Jiménez, was a lawyer and was a professor, deputy director and even director of the prestigious El Salvador school after the death of José de la Luz y Caballero, whose position he would hold until its closure in 1869. His mother came from the Canary Islands. He was the brother of Dr. Alfredo Zayas y Alfonso and Dr. Francisco de Zayas, who was the Ambassador of Cuba in Paris and Brussels.

His bachelor's degree was issued to him in 1886 and he managed to enroll in the Faculty of Medicine and Surgery of the University of Havana in the 1885–86 academic year. But during his medical studies his father died and he was very emotionally affected and one of his uncles, Francisco Javier, who was a doctor and university professor, was practically his tutor until the culmination of his medical career. Graduated from his profession, he decided to practice medicine in the rural area of the Island.

=== Cuban War of Independence ===
At the beginning of the Cuban War of Independence, on February 24, 1895, Zayas was one of those who supported as a young doctor and at only 27 years old joined the Cuban Revolutionary Army.

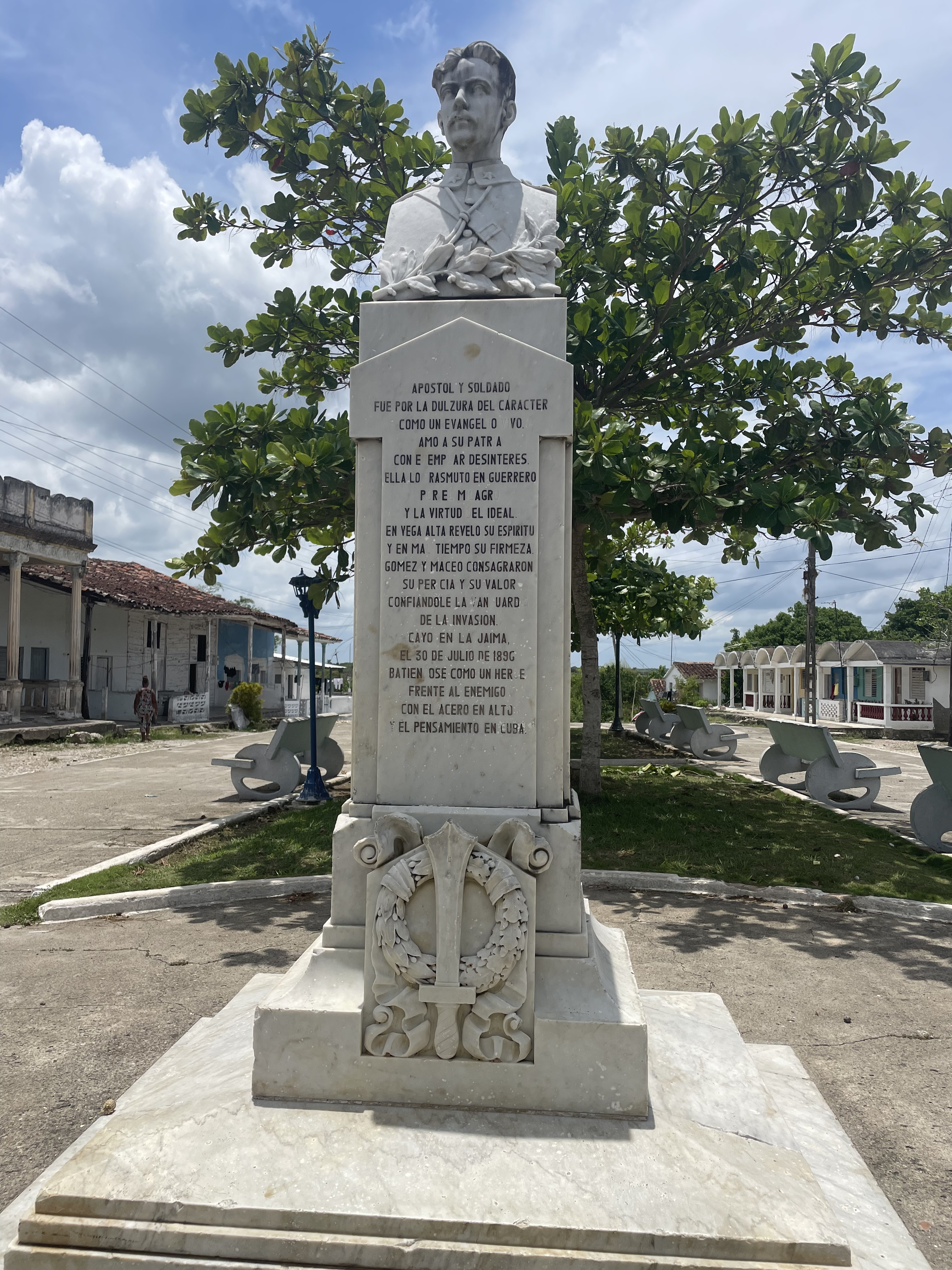
Juan Bruno Zayas statue in Vega Alta

He took up arms on April 25, 1895, at the head of a group in Vega Alta, Santa Clara Province (now Villa Clara Province), for which he was conferred the rank of Lieutenant Colonel.

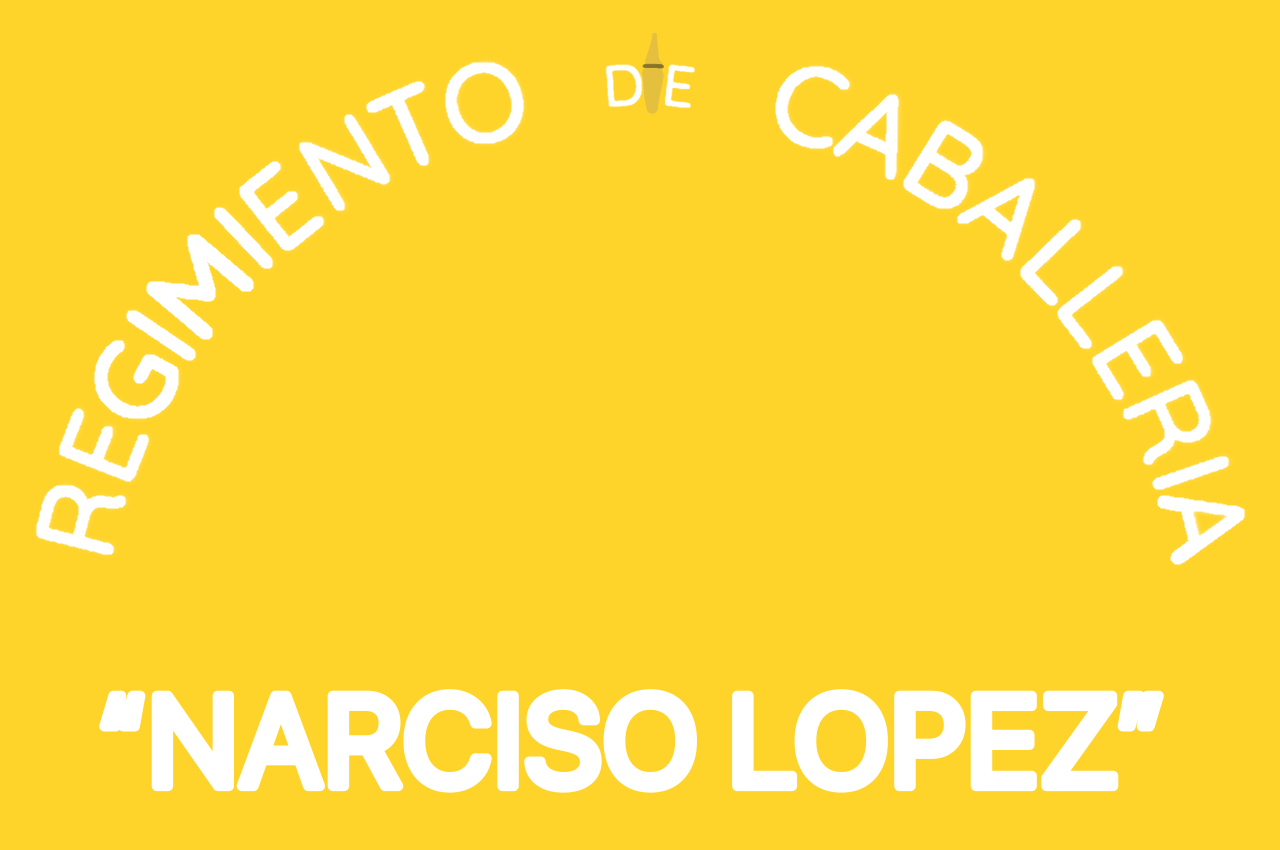
Flag of the Narciso López Regiment

He was at the head of the Narciso López Infantry Regiment when it was organized and on June 24, 1895, he went on to command the Villa Clara Cavalry Regiment, which he organized.

On July 18 of that same year, he placed himself under the orders of Major General Manuel Suárez, after attacking the provincial fort four days before. He was promoted to Colonel on August 15 and that same day he joined Major General Serafín Sánchez, Chief of the First Division of the Fourth Corps and thus participated in numerous combats until he joined the forces of Generalissimo Máximo Gómez, in Mal Tiempo.

On January 22, 1896, he entered Mantua at the head of the vanguard of the invading column. He was one of the signatories of the Act issued there, the next day, concluding the historic and legendary Invasion from East to West in Cuba.

He also fought in numerous battles where he was seriously wounded and fought in Matanzas, Havana, etc. Already in June 1896 he was once again operating in Havana, his native province. Regarding his promotion to Brigadier General, it is said that Major General Antonio Maceo conferred that rank upon him when the invasion of Guane arrived, on January 20, 1896.

But the truth is that the Bronze Titan delivered the proposal to the General in Chief in a letter dated in Nueva Paz, on February 21 of that same year, who in turn sent it to the Governing Council, on April 8, being approved the next day, becoming the youngest General of the Liberation Army until that moment.

Surprised in an enemy ambush due to an informer of the place where he was camping, Zayas died at his combat post on July 30, 1896.
