= Chorrerón, Cuba =

Rural town in Villa Clara, Cuba

Chorrerón
- Rural Town
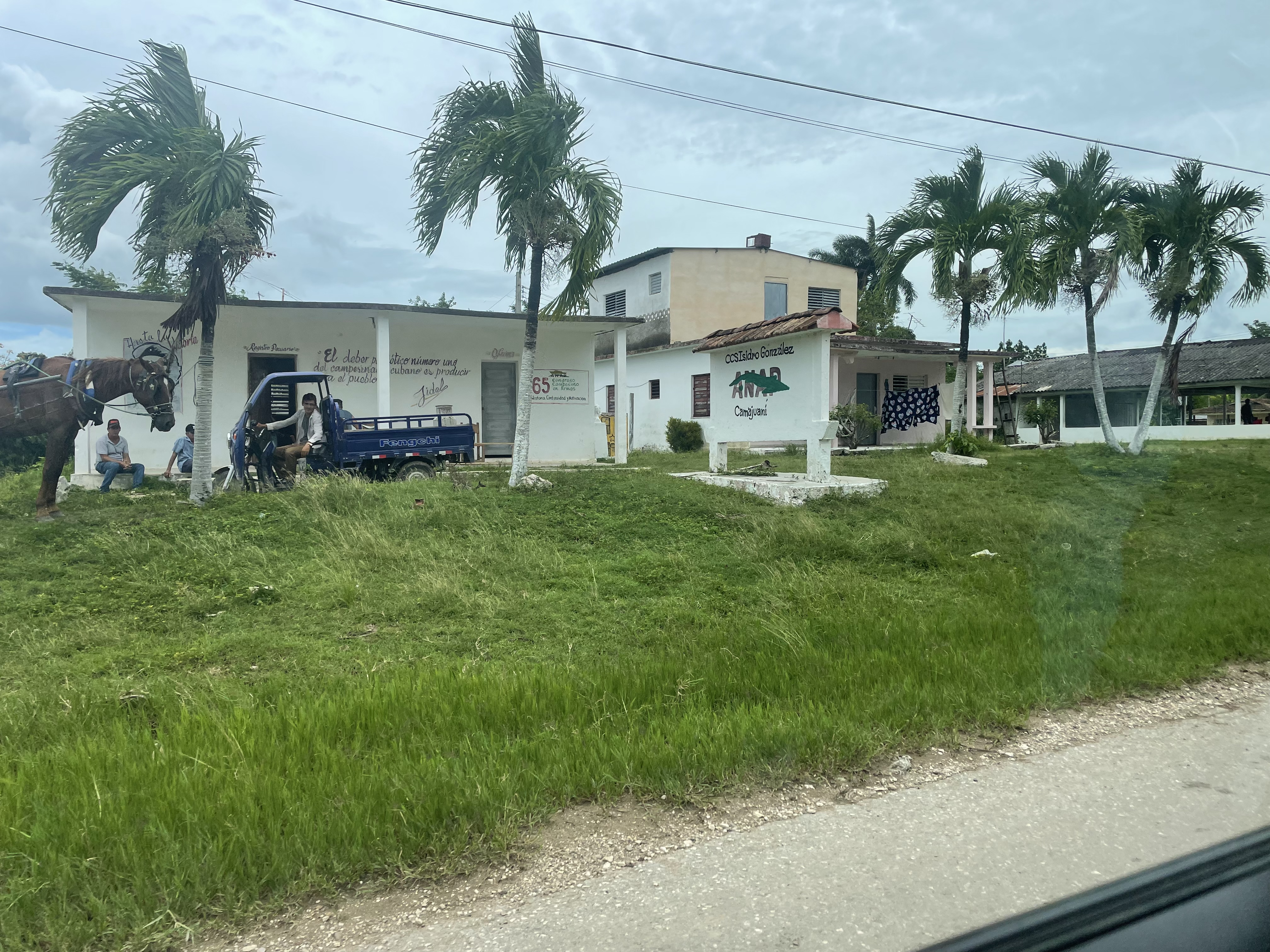
- CCS Isidro Gonzalez sign seen on the Circuito Norte

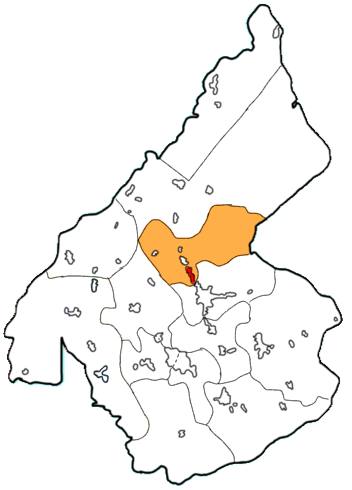
- Map of Chorreron (red) in Aguada de Moya (orange) in Camajuani.
- Country: Cuba
- Province: Villa Clara
- Municipality: Camajuaní
- Ward: Aguada de Moya
- First settled: 1703

Population
  - Total: 614
- Postal code: 52500

Chorrerón is a small town in Camajuaní, Villa Clara Province, Cuba. With a population of 614 it is classified as a rural town. Some nearby towns include Vega de Palma, Vega Alta, Tarafa, Taguayabón, San Benigno, Vueltas, and Oliver.

== Education ==
In the town there is one school, which is:

- Isidro Glez Primary

== Economy ==
According at the DMPF (Departamento de control de la Dirección Municipal de Planificación Física or Management Control Department Municipal Physical Planning in English) of Camajuani, Chorrerón is a settlement linked to sources of employment or economic development.

Chorréron occupies the CCS (Cooperativa de Créditos y Servicios) of Isidro González.
