= Macagual, Villa Clara =

Macagual
- Rural settlement
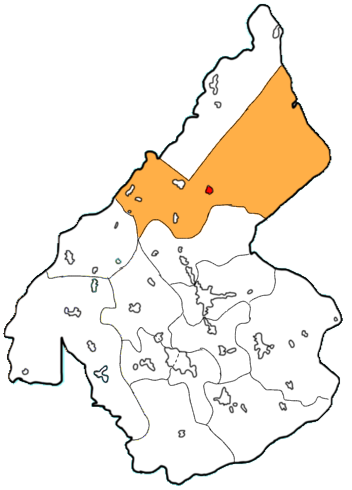
- Macagual (red) in Batalla de Santa Clara (orange) in Camajuaní

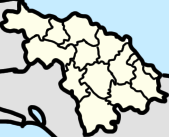
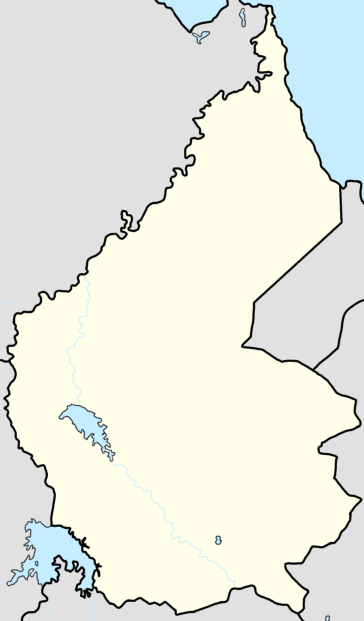
- Location in Cuba Macagual (Villa Clara Province) Macagual (Camajuaní)
- Coordinates: 22°36′14″N 79°41′54″W
- Country: Cuba
- Province: Villa Clara
- Municipality: Camajuaní
- Ward: Batalla de Santa Clara

Area
  - Land: 0.15 km^{2} (0.058 sq mi)

Population (14 September 2012)
  - Total: 1,349
  - Density: 9,000/km^{2} (23,000/sq mi)

Macagual is a rural settlement located in the north of Camajuaní, Cuba. It is surrounded by farms, which the main source of economic activity in the town after the Batalla de Santa Clara Sugar Mill, located nearby the town, shut down.

== Geography ==
The town is located in the ward of Batalla de Santa Clara, where it is surrounded by farmland. To get into the town there is the Camino Macagual, which splits from the Vial Playa Juan Francisco, nearby the Circuito Norte.

== History ==
In 1980, Macagual was made from a rural spread out settlement, to an apartment town, with 17 apartment buildings and 10 two-story houses being made in the town by the government.

In July 2024, the agricultural station of Macagual lost the second agricultural cycle due to the lack of water, along with El Piñón.

== Education ==
Macagual includes the Centro Mixto (CM) of Campaña de Las Villas.

== Transportation ==
The UEB Transporte Camajuaní (Camajuaní Transport) has a route from San Antonio de las Vueltas to Macagual costing 5.00 CUP.
