= Sabana =

Sabana may refer to:

== Places ==
- Sabana, Guantánamo, Cuba, a settlement in Cuba
- Sabana, Holguín, Cuba, a settlement in Cuba
- Sabana, Villa Clara, Cuba, a settlement in Cuba
- Sabana, Orocovis, Puerto Rico, a barrio in Puerto Rico
- Sabana, Vega Alta, Puerto Rico, a barrio in Puerto Rico
- Sabana, Luquillo, Puerto Rico, a barrio in Puerto Rico
- Sabana, Boven Saramacca, Suriname, a village or town in Boven Saramacca municipality (resort) in Sipaliwini District in Suriname
- Sabana, Para, Suriname, a village or town in Para, Suriname
