= Bosque, Cuba =

Bosque Potrero El Bosque
- Hamlet
- El Bosque
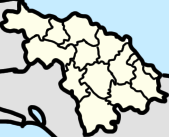
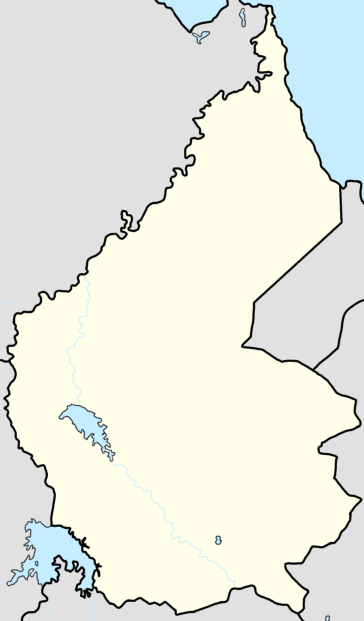
- Location in Cuba Bosque (Villa Clara Province) Bosque (Camajuaní)
- Coordinates: 22°29′12″N 79°44′29″W
- Country: Cuba
- Province: Villa Clara
- Municipality: Camajuani
- Wards (consejos populares): Camajuani II, La Quinta

Population
  - Total: 108

Bosque, also known as El Bosque, is a small hamlet in Camajuani, Cuba. It is located in the wards (consejos populares) of La Quinta and Camajuani II.

== History ==
In the Ten Years' War on November 4, 1895, Leoncio Vidal ordered for a surrender of the El Bosque fort.

=== Barrio of Bosque ===
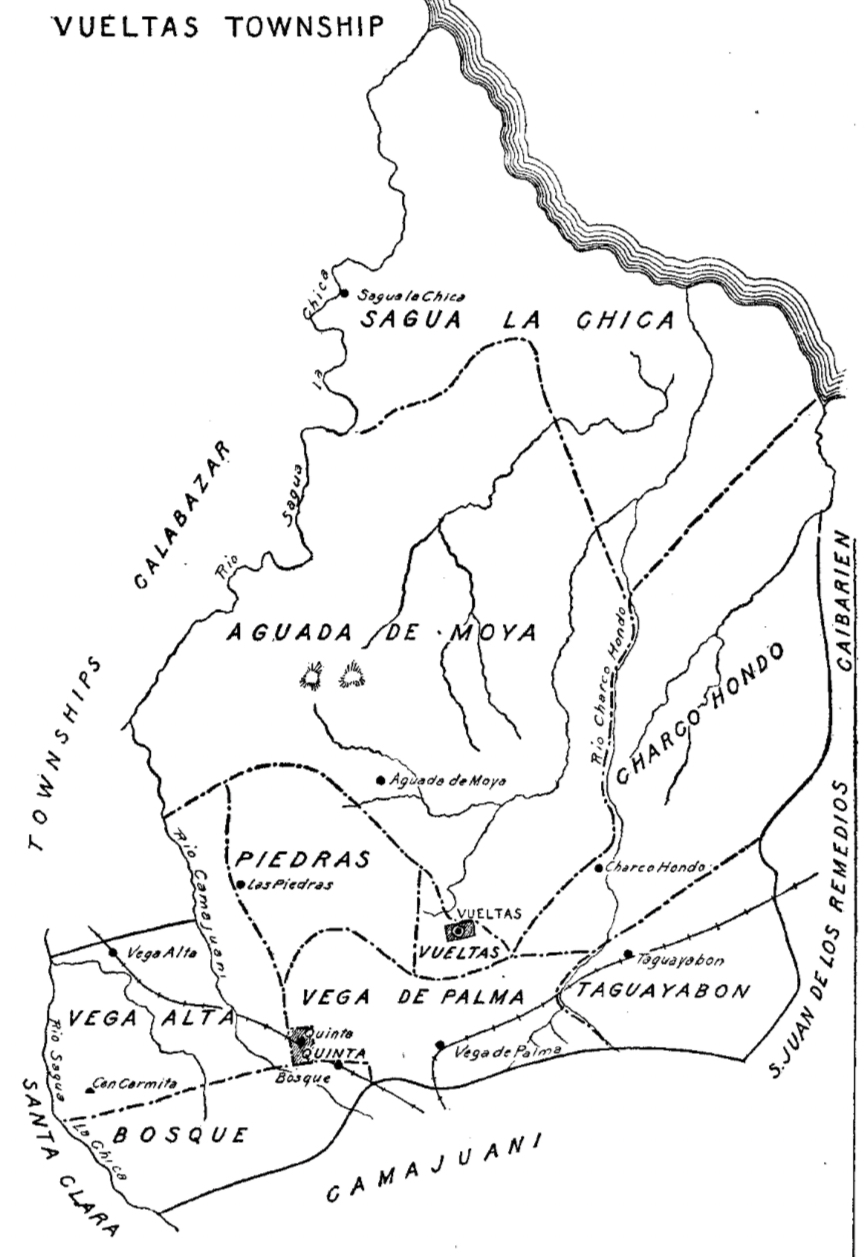
Map of Barrios of Vueltas in 1909

El Bosque formerly was a barrio and a part of San Antonio de las Vueltas, and was known as Potrero El Bosque.

On June 23, 1899, the Province of Santa Clara appointed 2 sworn guards to guard El Bosque, and many more settlements in the province.

==== Places in the barrio ====
The settlement of Corona, formerly Finca Corona or Corona Farm, was a part of the barrio of Bosque around 1951, in around 1953 Corona was a part of the barrio of Vega Alta. The Finca Astucia was also located in the barrio.

== Economy ==
According at the DMPF (Departamento de control de la Dirección Municipal de Planificación Física or Management Control Department Municipal Physical Planning in English) of Camajuani, El Bosque is a settlement not linked to any source of an economic or job development.

In the hamlet there is an egg hatchery, called UEB "El Bosque", owned by Lenier Juanrecio Torres.

== Education ==
El Bosque has one school being "Gertrudis Gómez de Avellaneda" Primary school.
