= Battle of Santa Clara (disambiguation) =

The Battle of Santa Clara may refer to:-

- Battle of Santa Clara in Cuba in 1958, won by Che Guevara
- Battle of Santa Clara (1847) in California
- Battle of Santa Clara (1927) in Nicaragua
- Batalla de Santa Clara, a ward in Cuba named after the 1958 battle
