= José María Pérez, Cuba =

José María Pérez La Fe
- Ward and Urban Settlement
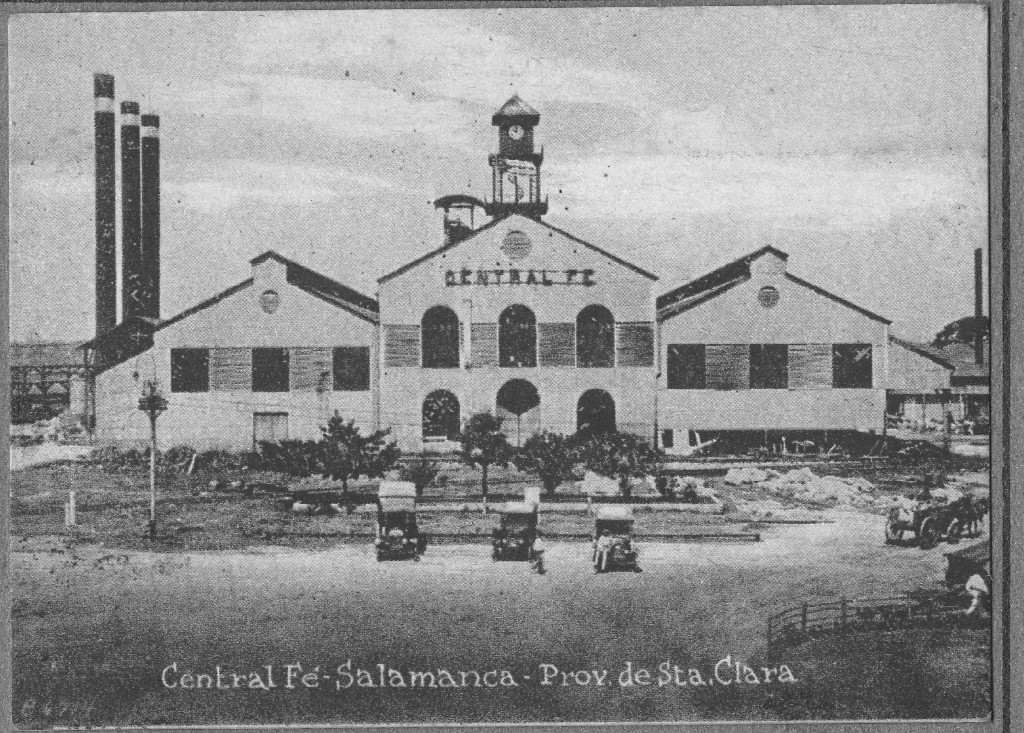
- Photo of the Central Fe sugar mill

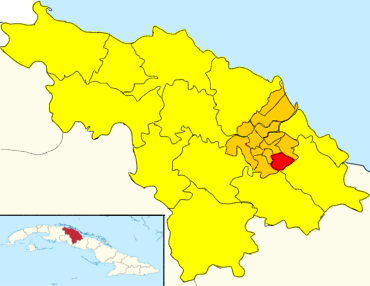
- Map of Fe (Red) in Camajuaní (Orange) in Villa Clara (Yellow)

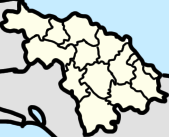
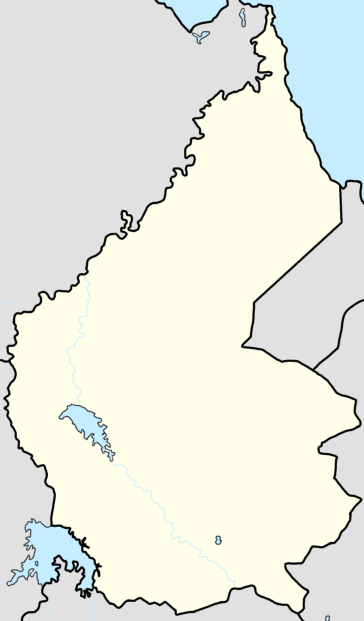
- Location within Cuba Location within Villa Clara Province Location within Camajuaní
- Coordinates: 22°26′02″N 79°41′07″W
- Country: Cuba
- Province: Villa Clara
- Municipality: Camajuaní

Government
  - President: Silvio Nadarse

Area
  - Ward: 105 km^{2} (41 sq mi)
  - Settlement: 0.88 km^{2} (0.34 sq mi)

Population (2012 Census)
  - Ward: 3,090
  - Ward density: 29/km^{2} (75/sq mi)
  - Settlement: 2,156
  - Settlement density: 2,450/km^{2} (6,300/sq mi)

José María Pérez also known as La Fe is a consejo popular (ward) and an urban settlement in Camajuaní, Cuba. Nearby settlements include Salamanca, Canada De Agua, Prudencia (or Chucho Prudencia), Fénix, Orovio, and Los Maestros. The settlement is known as Fe because of the sugar mill in it. The CAI José María Pérez sugar mill was formerly known as the Central Fe.

== Geography ==
Settlements in the ward include:

- Sabana
- Colmenar
- CPA 26 de Julio
- San Benigno
- Salamanca
- Paraíso
- Algarrobo
- Cien Rosas
- Loma de Turiño
- Loma Juan Pérez
- Loma Oriente
- La Julia

José María Pérez is bordered to the north by Taguayabón, bordered to the south by La Sabana, bordered to the east by Placetas, and to the west by Camajuani I. The entire ward has a population of 3090, with 105 square kilometres (41 sq mi).

== Economy ==
Cooperatives in the ward include:

- CPA 26 de Julio(named after the M 26 7 movement)
- CPA 1ro de Mayo(named after International Workers' Day)
- CCS José Antonio Echeverría(named after the Cuban Revolutionary with the same name)

According at the DMPF (Departamento de control de la Dirección Municipal de Planificación Física or Management Control Department Municipal Physical Planning in English) of Camajuani, José María Pérez is a settlement linked to sources of employment or economic development.

In Fe the sugar cane market is going down and farmers are getting poorer.

The ward of José María Pérez has the dams of Caturla and Colmenar inside of it.

== Education ==
Schools in the ward include:

- CM (Centro Mixto) José María Pérez

== History ==
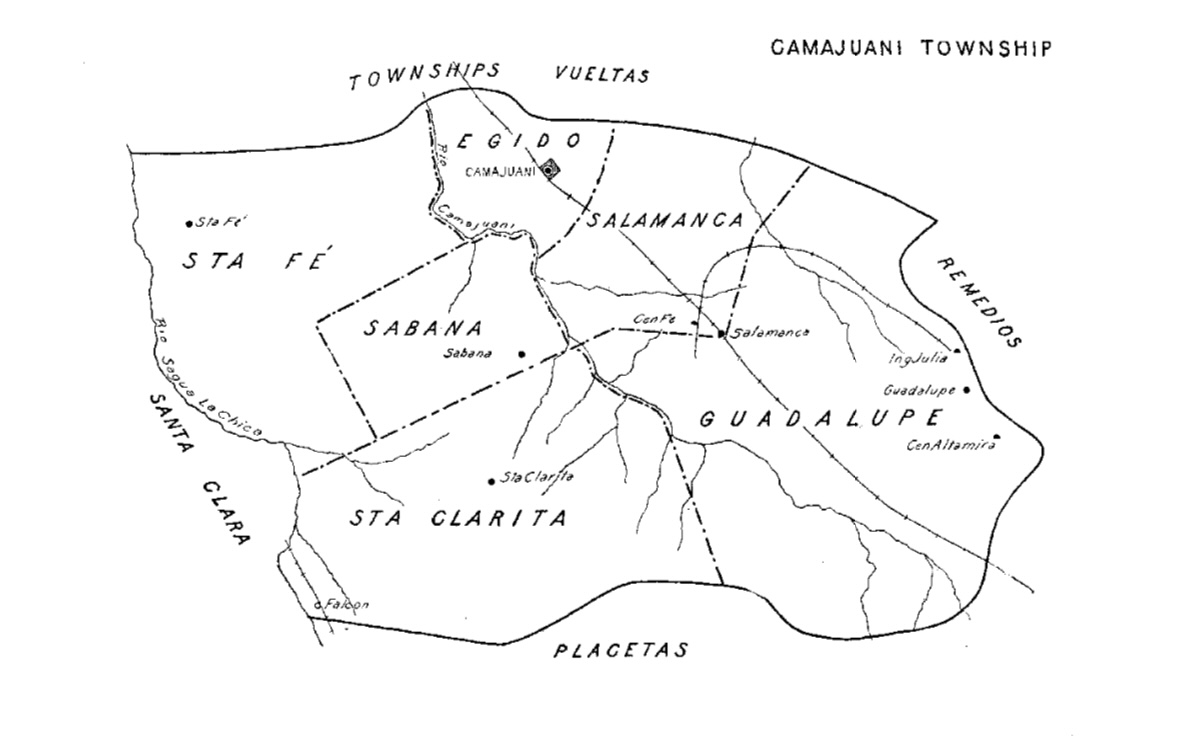
Map of Camajuaní in 1909, where Central Fe is labeled in Salamanca

Fe used to be a part of the barrio of Salamanca.

== Sports ==
Fe has one sport club, with it being the Peña Onelio Rodríguez.
