= Vasco Porcallo de Figueroa =

Spanish conquistador

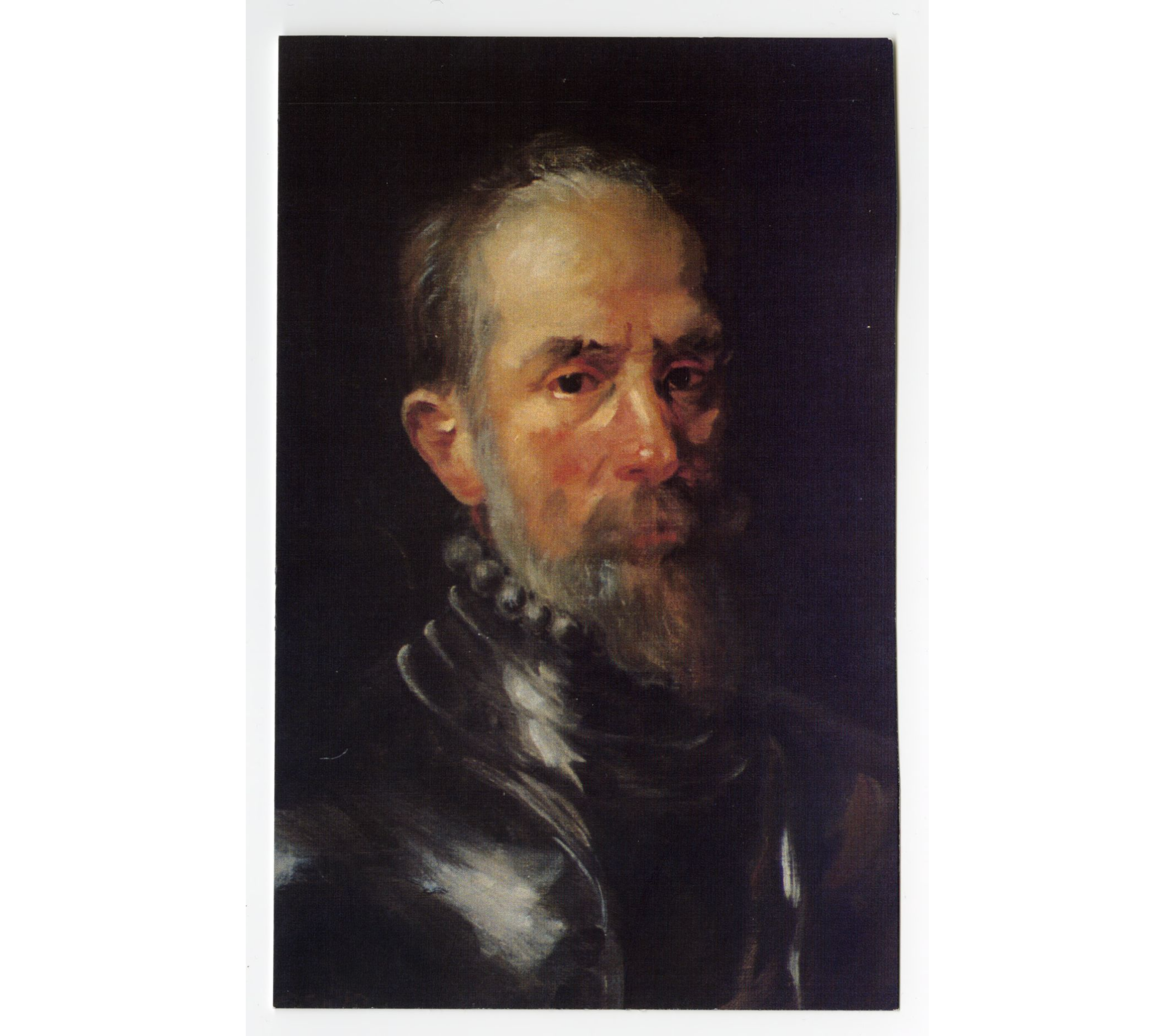
- Vasco Porcallo
- Born: c. 1481; Cáceres, Extremadura, Extremadura, Andalusia
- Died: 1550; Camagüey, Governorate of Cuba, New Spain
- Occupation: Conquistador
- Years active: 1502–1550
- Employer: Spanish Crown
- Known for: Founding several towns in Cuba
- Parents: Gutierre Porcallo de Sotomayor (father); Aldonza Manuel de Figueroa (mother)
- Relatives: Lorenzo II Suárez de Figueroa (great uncle)

Vasco Porcallo de Figueroa (Spanish pronunciation: [ˈbasko poɾˈkaʎo ðe fiˈɣeɾoa]; Cáceres, Extremadura, Spain, c. 1481 – Puerto Príncipe, Cuba, 1550) was a Spanish conquistador. He played a significant role in the early colonization of the Americas, including the subjugation of the Higüey and Jaragua provinces under Nicolás de Ovando's governorship in Santo Domingo. Porcallo de Figueroa founded several settlements in Cuba, including Sancti Spíritus and what later became Remedios, but in the time after its founding was called "Santa Cruz de la Savana de Vasco Porcallo". He became notorious for his brutal treatment of the Indigenous Siboneyes, and is also recognized for importing the first African slaves to Cuba.

== Early life ==
Vasco Porcallo de Figueroa was born in Cáceres, Spain, into a noble family with connections to the Portuguese nobility and the Spanish Counts of Feria. After serving in military campaigns in Spain and Italy, he traveled to the Americas, arriving in Santo Domingo in 1502 under the sponsorship of Governor Nicolás de Ovando.

He testified on January 28, 1522, that he was 28 years old, which, if true, would mean that he was born in 1494. More than one source includes the report that Porcallo fled Spain to escape the law, having murdered a cousin over a family inheritance. It is possible that he was concealing his true age to avoid identification, because if true, he would likely be too young to come to the Caribbean with Nicolás de Ovando and participate in the conquest of Hispaniola.

=== Early exploits ===
Under Ovando, Porcallo contributed significantly to the subjugation of the Higüey and Jaragua provinces, receiving large land grants and control over local Indigenous populations as rewards.

=== Founding of Cuban settlements ===
In 1514, as one of Diego Velázquez de Cuéllar's captains, Porcallo was assigned to the conquest of the island of Cuba, where he founded the towns of Puerto Príncipe, Sancti Spiritus, San Juan de los Remedios, and Trinidad. He owned a country property called La Sabana, located near Remedios, where he made a great fortune from his plantations and mines worked by his Siboney slaves. His governance was marked by harsh rule, and several source corroborate his atrocities against the native population.

=== Later years and controversies ===
Porcallo's rule was characterized by brutality towards the Indigenous Siboneyes, often raiding their villages and enslaving them. Despite his ruthless reputation, some contemporaries like Bishop Diego Sarmiento depicted him as a generous and vital figure in sustaining the colonial settlements. In the previously mentioned testification from 1522, it is brought to light that he cut off the genitals and limbs of four male natives, and made them eat their own privates, and then made them eat dirt. One would later commit suicide, while the other three died from eating dirt.

In the 1530s, facing the depletion of native labor forces, Porcallo was among the first to import African slaves to work his lands.

== Expedition to Florida ==
In 1539, despite his advanced age, Porcallo joined Hernando de Soto's expedition to Florida, intending to capture slaves. He quickly returned to Cuba due to the hardships encountered, leaving his illegitimate son, Gómez de Figueroa, in Florida.

== Personal life ==
Porcallo married Tínima, the daughter of a local cacique, and was known for having numerous Indigenous concubines. He reportedly fathered over a hundred children, some of whom, along with their mothers, reportedly committed suicide.

The names of his known children are:

- Leonor de la Cerda
- Teresa de la Cerda Sotomayor y Casenda, married to Esteban de Lagos Mejías
- María de Figueroa, married to Capitán Juan de Argote
- Elvira Lasso de la Vega, married to Martín de Rojas, son of Manuel de Rojas and Magdalena Velázquez
- Vasco Porcallo de Figueroa
- Cristóbal Porcallo de Figueroa
- Lorenzo Gómez Juárez de Figueroa

== Death and legacy ==
Porcallo died in 1550 in Puerto Príncipe, a city he founded. His legacy is controversial; remembered as both a pioneering colonizer and a brutal encomendero. His actions significantly shaped the early colonial history of Cuba but also led to severe Indigenous suffering and displacement.
