= Sabana, Villa Clara =

Coordinates: 22°24′32″N 79°43′24″W

Sabana Andres Cuevas
- Settlement
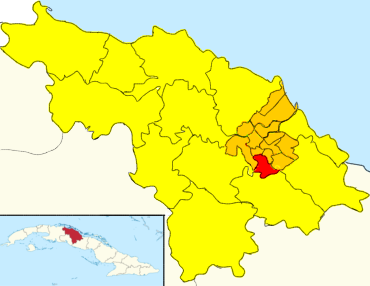
- Former ward of Sabana seen in red

- Location within Cuba
- Country: Cuba
- Province: Villa Clara
- Municipality: Camajuani
- Ward: José María Pérez

Population
  - Total: 951

Sabana, also known as La Sabana, or Andrés Cuevas, is a settlement located in the ward of José María Pérez, Villa Clara Province, Cuba. Sabana itself used to be its own ward, but later became a part of José María Pérez. Sabana is located a few kilometers away from the municipal seat of Camajuaní.

== History ==
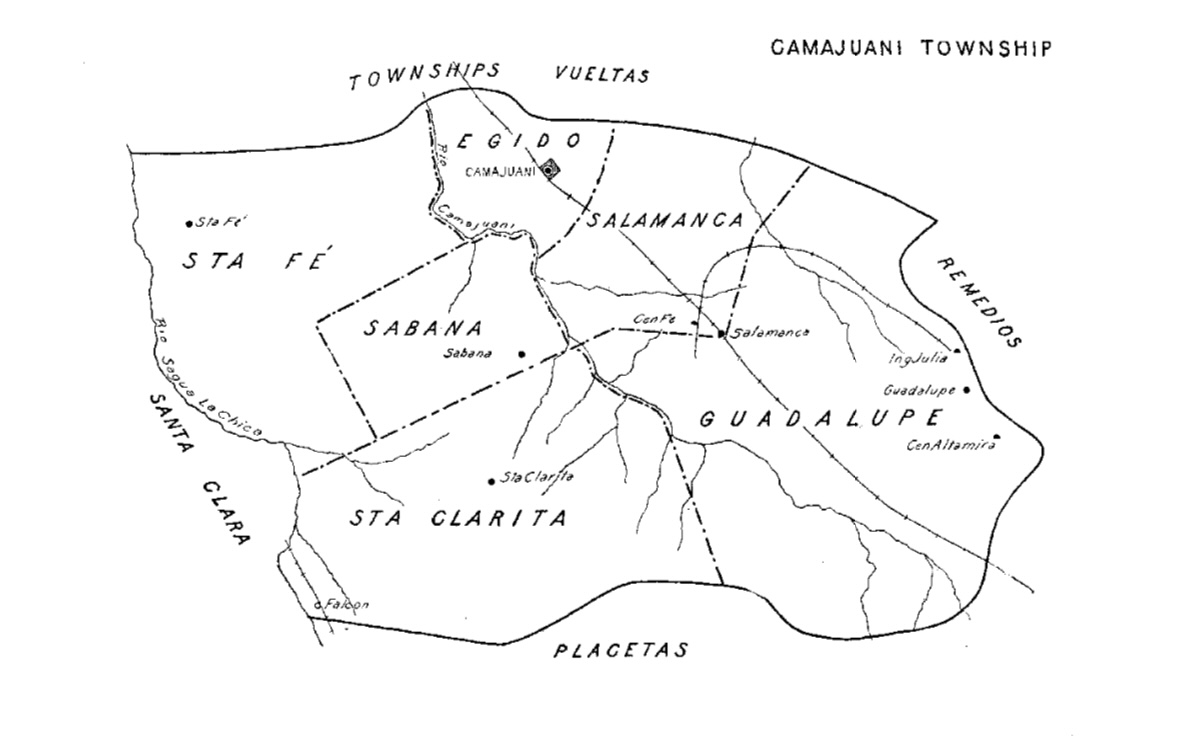
The barrio of Sabana seen on a map of Camajuaní in 1909

Sabana used to be a former barrio of the municipality of Camajuaní, which it still is a part of. In 1902, the barrio of Sabana had a population of 1,602. Sabana bordered the barrios of Santa Clarita, Salamanca, Egido, Santa Fé, and a quadripoint with Guadalupe.

Before Sabana became a part of José María Pérez, it was its own consejo popular, including the settlements of Sabana itself, and El Mamey, El Pesquero, Colmenar, and El Camarón. It became part of José María Pérez sometime between 2019 and 2020.

== Economy ==
Sabana is one of the most populated settlements in the municipality of Camajuaní that is classified as poor, with many houses not being stable and not having stable infrastructure, with roofs being vulnerable to winds.

Sabana includes the CPA Andres Cuevas, where it gets its nickname from.

== Education ==
Sabana has the primary school of Camilo Cienfuegos, named after Cuban revolutionary Camilo Cienfuegos.

== Sports ==
In Sabana, there is a sports complex which includes baseball, soccer, volleyball, and basketball.
