= Camajuaní II =

- Ward
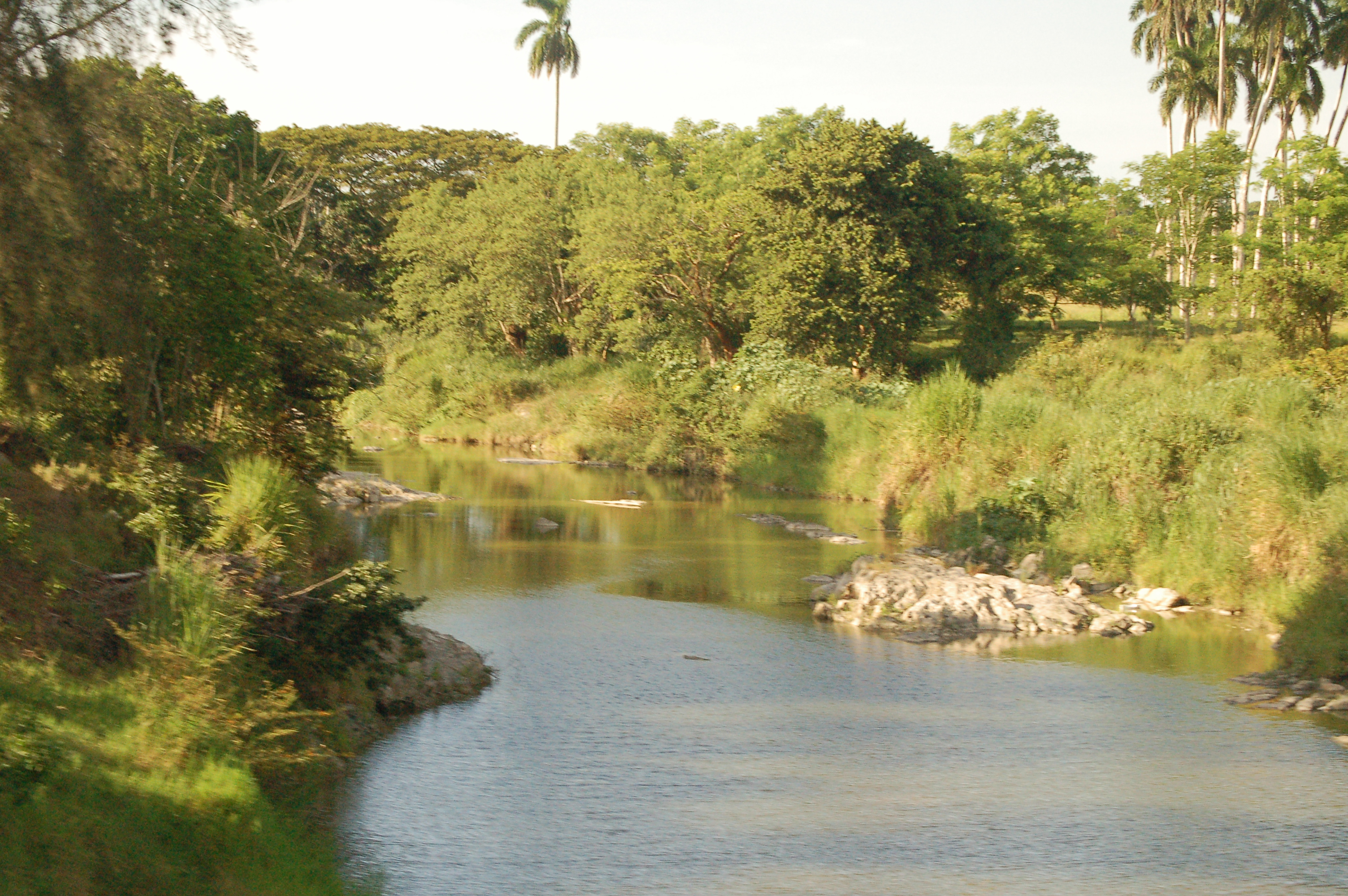
- Picture of the Camajuaní River in Tarafa, in Camajuaní II

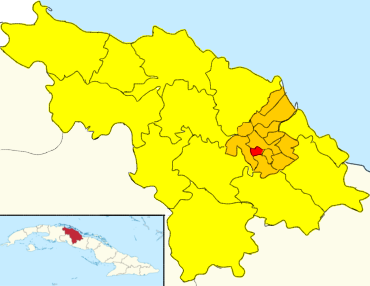
- Camajuaní II (red) in Camajuaní (orange) in Villa Clara (yellow)
- Country: Cuba
- Province: Villa Clara
- Municipality: Camajuaní
- Settled: 1841
- Incorporated as a ward: 1988

Government
  - President: Celedonio Valdés Triana

Population
  - Total: 8,838

Camajuaní II is a consejo popular ('ward') in Camajuaní, Cuba. Combined with Camajuaní I they have a population of 21,700.

== Geography ==
Zoomed in map of Camajuani II

Camajuaní II borders Sabana, Luis Arcos Bergnes, La Quinta, Vega de Palma, and Camajuaní 1. Towns in Camajuani II include the western side of the main town of Camajuani, the southern side of El Bosque, Tarafa, Crucero Tarafa, Matilde, Monte de la Coja, and Blanquizal. Barrios (neighborhoods) of Camajuaní II include Pueblo Nuevo, Centro 2, Centro 3, Terminal, and Mondongo.
