= Parrandas =

Street fairs in Cuba

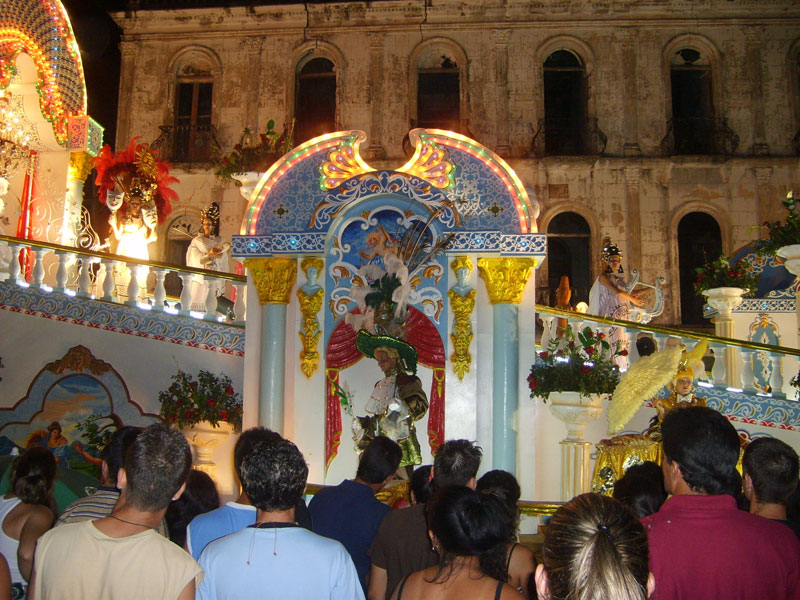
2007's "Goat" district float in Camajuani slowly passing in front of the colonial structure of the local theatre.

Parrandas are traditional carnival-like street fairs or block parties, with origins dating back to the 19th century. They take place in northern and central cities of the former Las Villas province (now divided into Villa Clara, Sancti Spíritus and Ciego de Ávila provinces) in Cuba. Most famous parrandas are celebrated in Remedios colonial city where these festivities were originated. Second most popular are celebrated in Camajuaní, followed in popularity by Vueltas, Zulueta, Chambas, Guayos, El Santo, Taguayabón, Buenavista, Calabazar de Sagua, Zaza del Medio, General Carrillo, Vega Alta and many more small town of this central region of Cuba.

The celebrations in Remedios are held from Christmas Eve to Christmas Day.

== Origins and history ==
Testimonies place the Parrandas with structure of events similar to what is today as far as 1875. This includes both districts rumba, the plaza works (light and fireworks structures), the fireworks competition and float display.

By the 19th century the noisy children had developed into people's rumba with rhythm, music and verses (usually instigating the other district). The first instruments used in the rumba were cencerro, bombo, repique, and one special local drum called "atambora". Later, tumbadoras were added and in the 1930s trumpets finalized the instrumentation.

== Events ==
Even when the entire night is celebrated under a competition mood, the Parranda actually is a friendly display of two districts that separate each northern town in Villa Clara province.

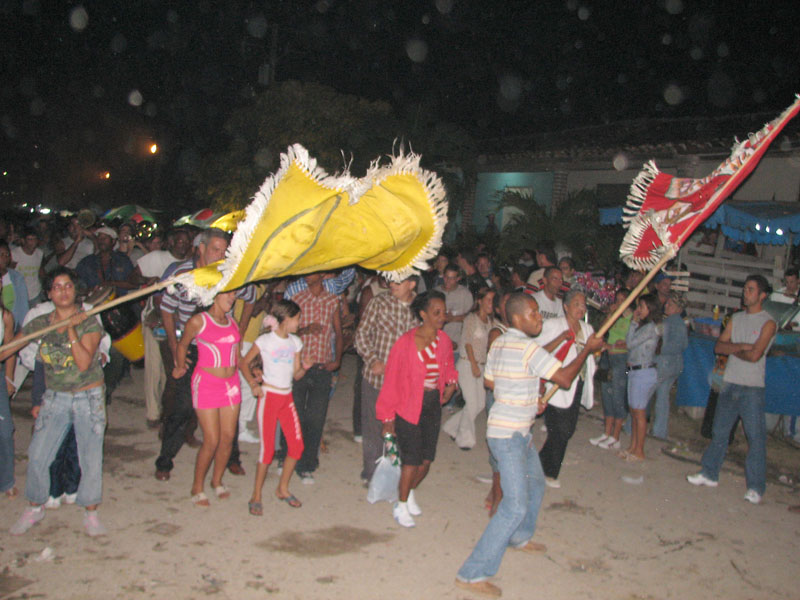
A district rumba, the musicians and flag carriers drag with their rhythm the followers.

First event: Around 10:00 pm the district in charge of the first display of the night announces his first rumba with a "palenque"; palenques are fireworks designed in such a way that once airborne they are almost soundless making them "invisible" among the ambient noise, they explode with a huge bang a few meters overtaking by surprise the people gathered in town. Immediately after this, the rumba starts with the purpose of "dragging" as many dancers as the people while they sign their polka. Once the first district is finished the other one makes its entrance as well. This is repeated several times until the next event.

Second event: In Remedios city the second event is the lighting of the plaza works, in the rest of the cities is the float lighting. Floats are huge architectural structures filled with colours, light bulbs and fantasy décor hauled by a tractor. They have a theme each year and the characters on them have over the top fantasized outfits. In most of the towns these characters should keep still like statues, they are not allowed to move while the float is moving forward and the legend is read to the public, failing to do so will demerit the district. In Taguayabon on the contrary while the legend is read the characters perform as in a theatre play. But this behaviour is rather new and been consider "un-tasty" and against the classic tradition in the nearby locations.

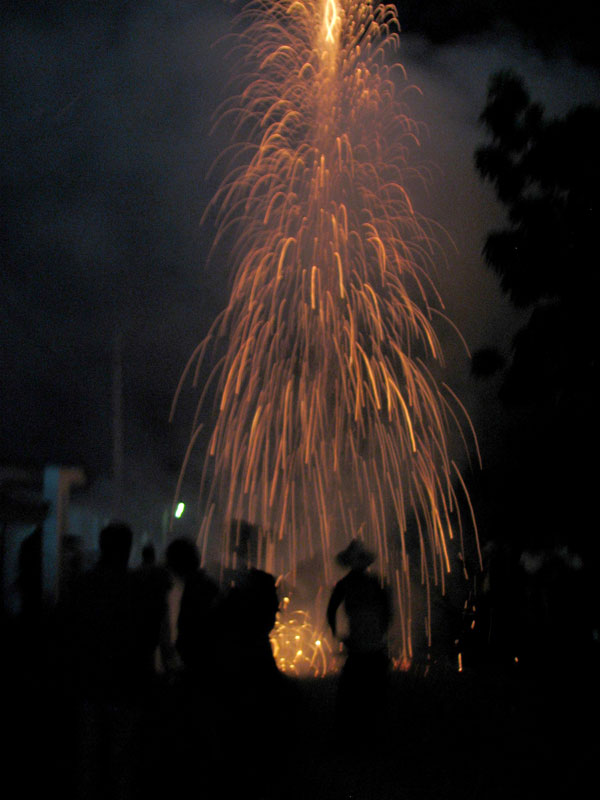
Pyrotechnics lighting up lines of fireworks in 2007 parrandas.

Final event: The fireworks. When the float’s legend is finished and the structure has reached the end of its travel, which is no more than 40 meters, the pyrotechnics, which have rapidly placed lines as long as three or four blocks of rockets in the streets, use torches and running by the sides of the racks lit them. Once single run should use near 20 000 rockets. When the regular fireworks are finished the "mortars" are lit as well. Mortars are the antithesis of palenques since this type of firework makes a loud "canon like" sound that announces the end of its district display.

== Parrandas vs. carnivals ==
Modern parrandas also come associated with all sort of vendors and activities on the side. Snacks like candies, pork and ham sandwich, pizza, traditional rice with pork and yucca, handmade toys and craft can be found all over. Occasionally there are some rides like Ferris wheels, carousels and dragon boats.

While every town possesses their own particularities, parandas in general, follow a very similar structure of events based on their very roots and while they might look similar to carnivals they do not share much commonality. In the carnivals there are also floats, but instead of two representing districts there are as many as possible for the hosting city because the mayor even here is the float display and it takes hours and kilometres of city roads for all of them to finish the run. These floats are also big in size but smaller compared to the ones made in Remedios, Camajuani and Vueltas cities. Characters in the floats perform elaborate dances combining salsa, mambo, cha cha and all sort of tropical rhythms. There are as many rumbas as floats because in Carnivals they become a duo, and the rumba announces the float. Rumba performers do not expect the people in town to join them since streets are closed in the first place. They also are as over-the-top dressed as the characters in the floats and perform complicated routines. There is a small fireworks display announcing the last float just crossing the finish line, and this leads to the end of the competitive run.

Most famous carnivals in Cuba took place in Santiago de Cuba, Havana and Santa Clara. From these only the last one is still celebrated properly. The other ones have been cancelled or have seen a total restriction of events due to lack of money.

== Gallery ==
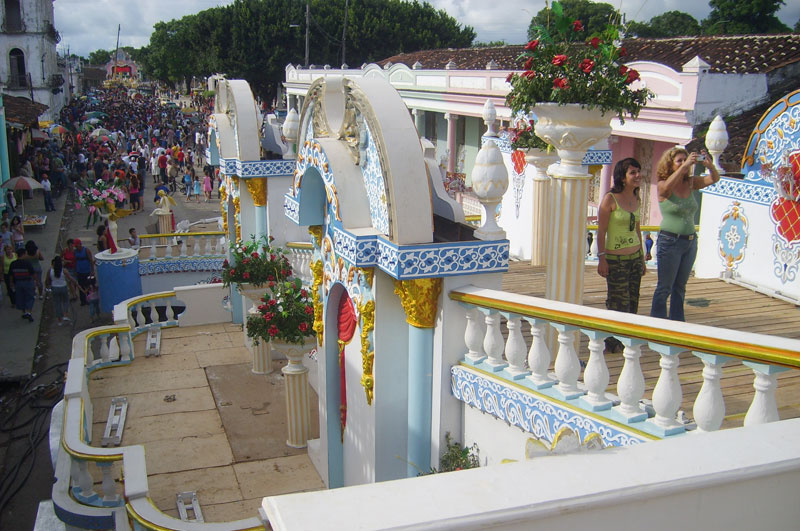
Preparations for the night party in Camajuani, after a year of secrecy making all the details, floats are assembled in two days only.

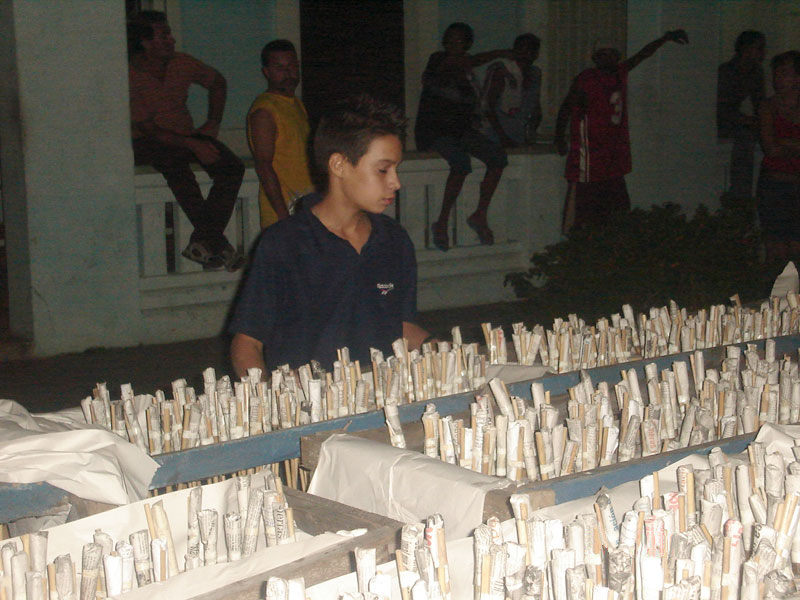
A kid stares at firework filled racks just ready for take off in Camajuani streets. Several blocks are filled with these.

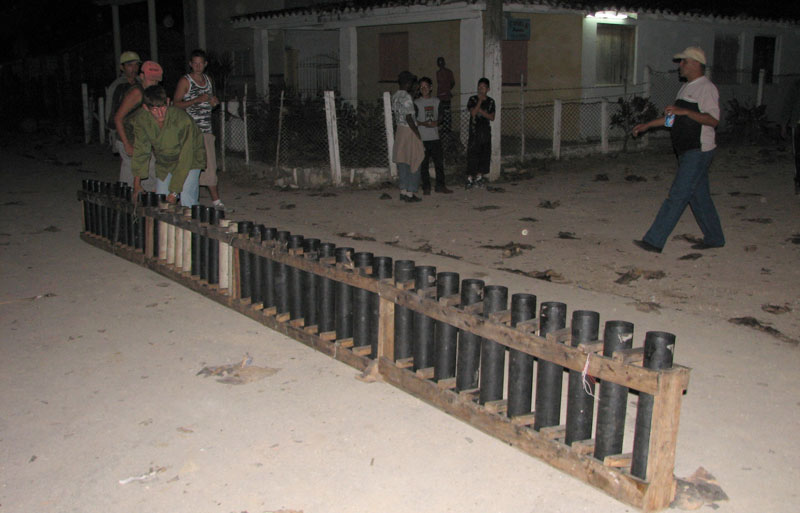
Morteros (mortar cannons) ready to by fire.

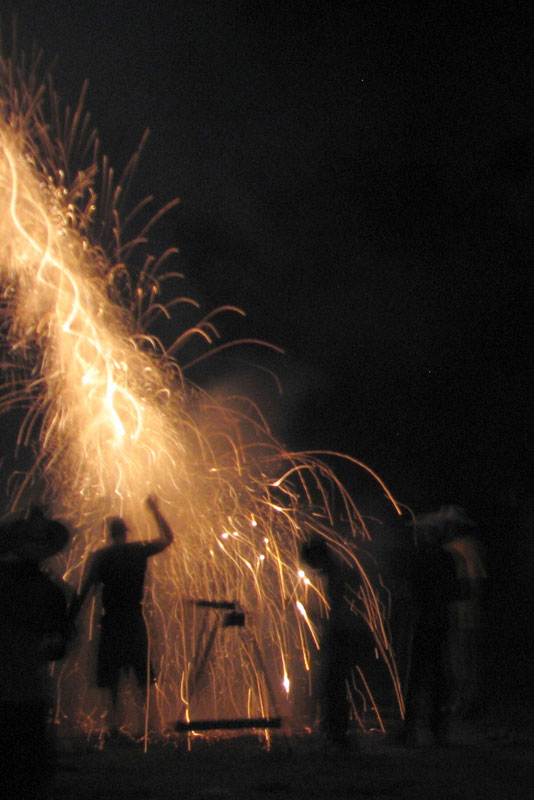
Pyrotechnics at work in Taguayabon parrandas.

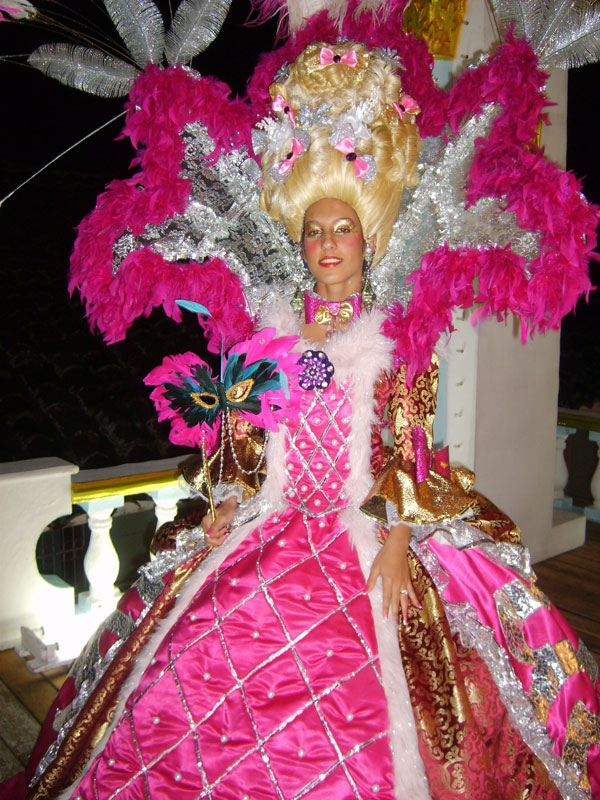
A character in costume.

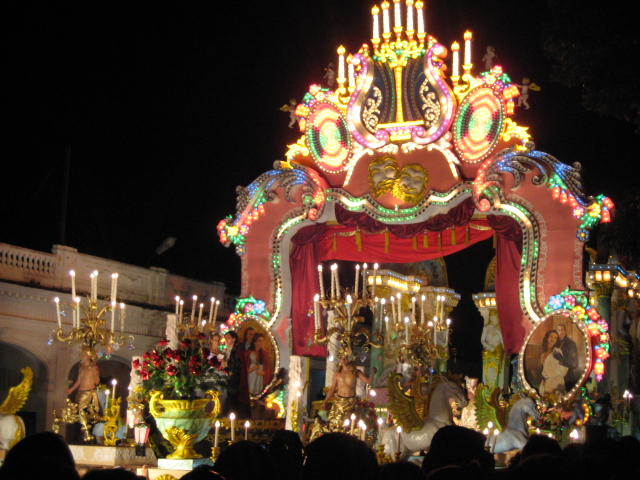
The Phantom of the Opera a 2007 Toad's district float in Camajuani.

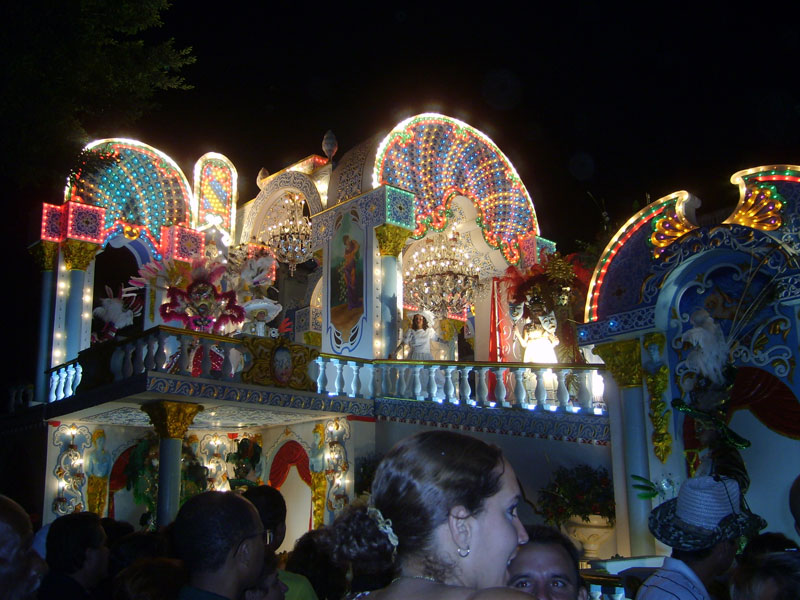
King Louis the 14th 2007 Goat's district float.

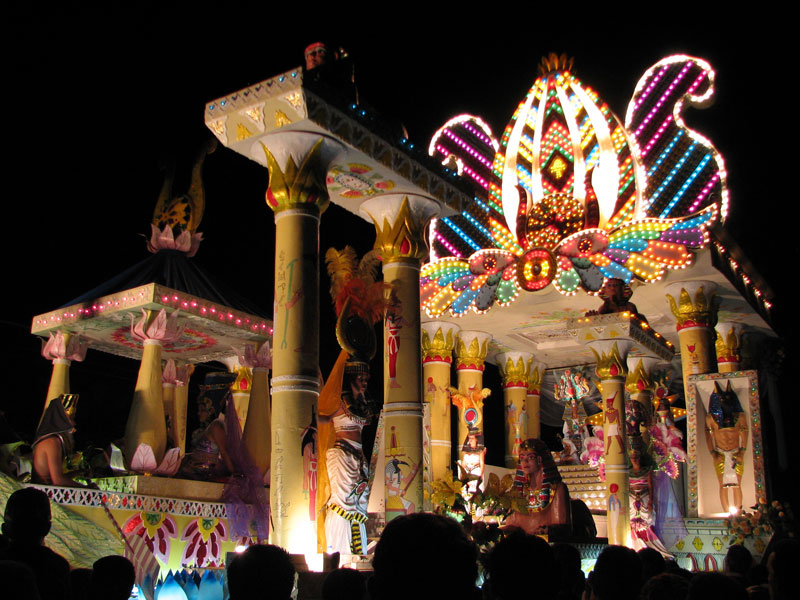
'Cleopatra' 2007 Hawk's district in Taguayabon.

== See also ==
- Municipalities of Cuba
- List of cities in Cuba
- Junkanoo
