= María Matilde Alea Fernández =

María Matilde Alea Fernández (March 6, 1918 – November 9, 2006) was a Cuban composer and teacher.

A native of Camajuaní, Alea began her musical studies in Pinar del Río; later she matriculated at the Orbón Conservatory in Havana. Her compositions include works for piano, such as the Miniaturas ritmicas cubanas of 1978.
