= General Carrillo =

General Carrillo Cangrejo
- Ward
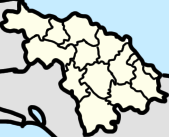
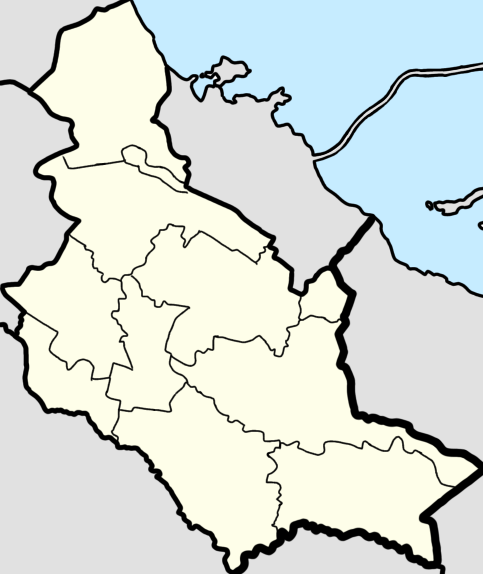
- Location within Cuba Location within Villa Clara Province Location within Remedios
- Coordinates: 22°15′47″N 79°24′2″W
- Country: Cuba
- Province: Villa Clara
- Municipality: Remedios
- Named for: Francisco Carrillo Morales

Area
  - Land: 0.8089 km^{2} (0.3123 sq mi)

Population (14 September 2012)
  - Total: 2,595
  - Density: 3,208/km^{2} (8,310/sq mi)

General Carrillo is an urban settlement and ward located on the Remedios, Cuba. It is located about 28 kilometers away from the municipal seat of Remedios, and was originally known as Cangrejo.

== History ==
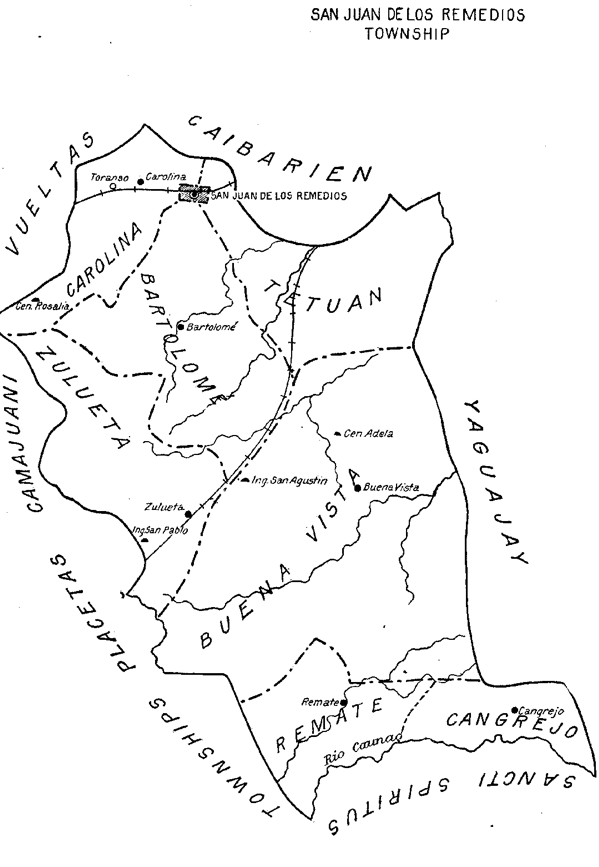
Map showing relative locations of the barrios of Remedios 1909

In 1909, when it was still known as Cangrejo, it was a small place containing 3 stores and 20 thatched houses, being 25.5 miles away from the municipal seat of Remedios.

General Carrillo was a former barrio of the municipality of Remedios. It bordered the barrio of Remate de Ariosa (or simply Remate) to the west, Buena Vista to the north, the municipality of Yaguajay to the north and east, and the municipality of Sancti Spíritus to the south.

== Geography ==
The ward of General Carrillo includes the settlements of General Carrillo, Levisa, Alameda, San Gregorio, La Elvira, Chucho Alfredo, Batey Colorado, and Duise Maria. The ward borders the ward of Remate de Ariosa to the west, Buena Vista to the north, the municipality of Yaguajay to the east, and the municipality of Cabaiguán to the south.

The town of General Carrillo in located on the Mamey–Jarahueca Road, or officially the 4–571 highway, a unpaved road linking it to Levisa and later Buenavista in the north, and Jarachueca, Sancti Spíritus Province, in the east. There’s also another unpaved road heading west to San Gregorio.

General Carrillo also has a train stop in the north of the town, on the Línea Norte, which has stops at the Morón–Santa Clara route and the Santa Clara–Nuevitas Route.

== Demographics ==
Historical population
- 1907: 1252
- 1919: 1646
- 1931: 2360
- 1943: 3019
- 1981: 2047
- 2002: 2661
- 2012: 2595

In the 1907 census, the barrio of Cangrejo contained a population of 1252. In the 1919 census, the barrio of General Carrillo contained a population of 1646, in 1931, the barrio had a population of 2360, and in 1943 it had a population of 3019.

In modern history, the urban settlement of General Carrillo had a population of 2047 in 1981, 2661 in 2002, and 2595 in 2012.
