= Camajuaní I =

- Ward
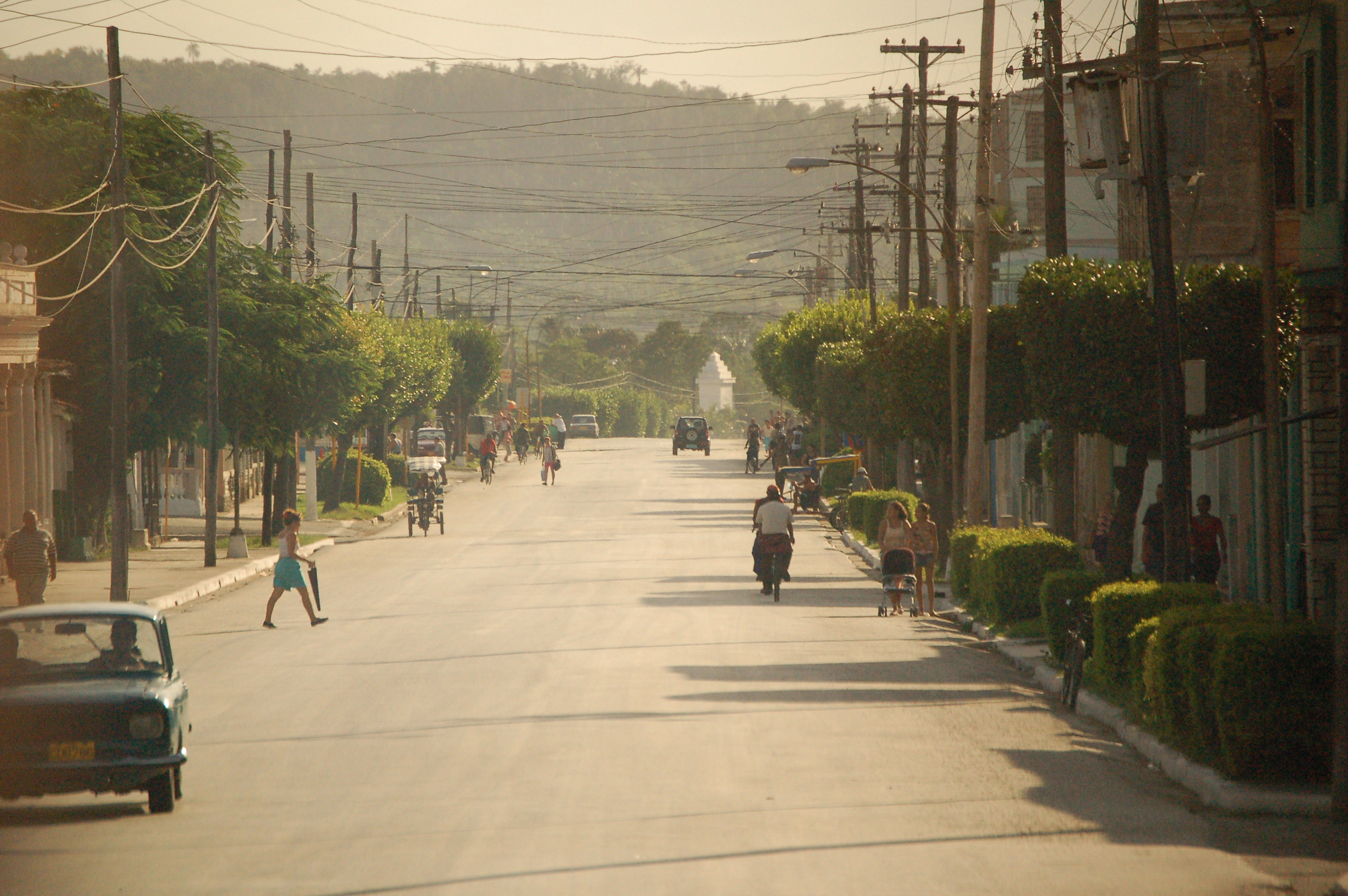

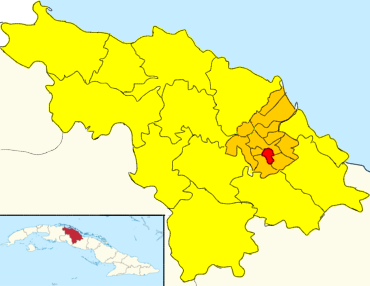
- Camajuani I (red) in Camajuani (orange) in Villa Clara (yellow)
- Country: Cuba
- Province: Villa Clara
- Municipality: Camajuani
- Settled: 1841
- Incorporated as a ward: 1988

Government
  - Acting President: Osviel Isvey Rodríguez Seijo

Population
  - Total: 12,862
- Website: soycamajuani.gob.cu/es/delegados/315-consejo-popular-camajuani-i

Camajuaní I (or Camajuaní One) is a consejo popular ("ward") in Camajuaní, Cuba. Combined with Camajuani II they have a population of 21,700.

== Geography ==
The popular council borders Camajuaní II, Sabana, José María Pérez, and Vega de Palma.

== Government ==
Camajuaní has multiple Constituency Delegate (Delegado Circunscripción) for every ward, Camajuani I has: (as of March 28, 2023)

- Constituency Delegate 7, Germán Valentín Broche Molina
- Constituency Delegate 8, José Miguel García Hernández
- Constituency Delegate 9, Rosalba Águila Fernández
- Constituency Delegate 10, Reinel Fusté Caro
- Constituency Delegate 11, José E. Acevedo Martínez
- Constituency Delegate 12, Sheylah del Carmen Bermúdez González
- Constituency Delegate 14, Yunior Trejo Asencio
- Constituency Delegate 15, Otoniel González Ruíz
- Constituency Delegate 17, Martha Aimé Pérez Pérez
- Constituency Delegate 18, Heldy Sánchez Vergara
- Constituency Delegate 19, Julia Ramona Madrigal Portal
- Constituency Delegate 20, Luisa Inés Ruíz Pérez
- Constituency Delegate 23, Vismar Martínez Echevarría
- Constituency Delegate 27, Yosvel Delgado Fernández
- Constituency Delegate 28, Ramón Norberto Peña La Rosa
- Constituency Delegate 57, Julio García Rodríquez
