= Taguayabón =

- Village
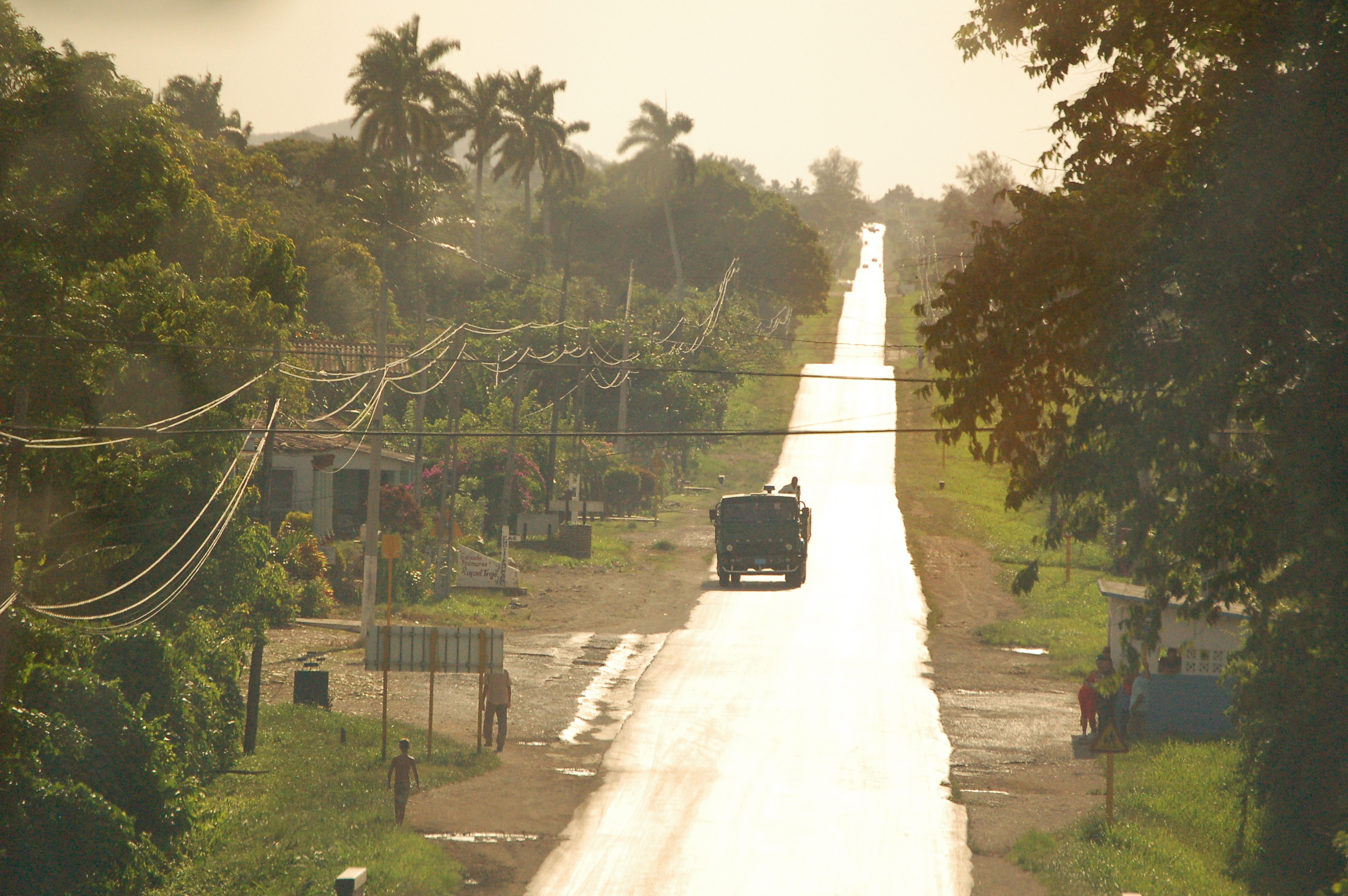
- The Circuito Norte in Taguayabon

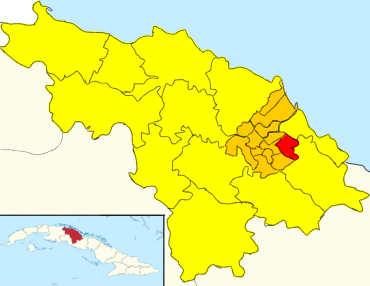
- Map of Taguayabón (Red) in Camajuaní (Orange) in Villa Clara (Yellow)

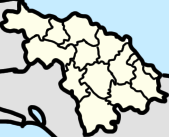
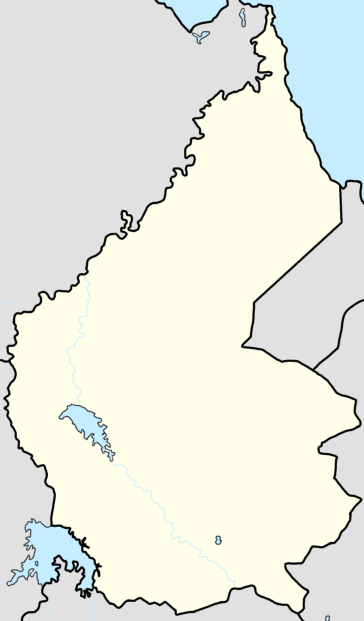
- Location of Taguayabón in Cuba Taguayabón (Villa Clara Province) Taguayabón (Camajuaní)
- Coordinates: 22°28′39.8″N 79°39′01.2″W
- Country: Cuba
- Province: Villa Clara
- Municipality: Camajuaní
- Founded: 1830
- Elevation: 80 m (260 ft)

Population (2012)
  - Total: 2,053
- Time zone: UTC-5 (EST)
- Area code: +53-422

Taguayabón is a Cuban village and consejo popular (ward) of the municipality of Camajuaní, in Villa Clara Province. In 2012 it had a population of 2053.

== History ==
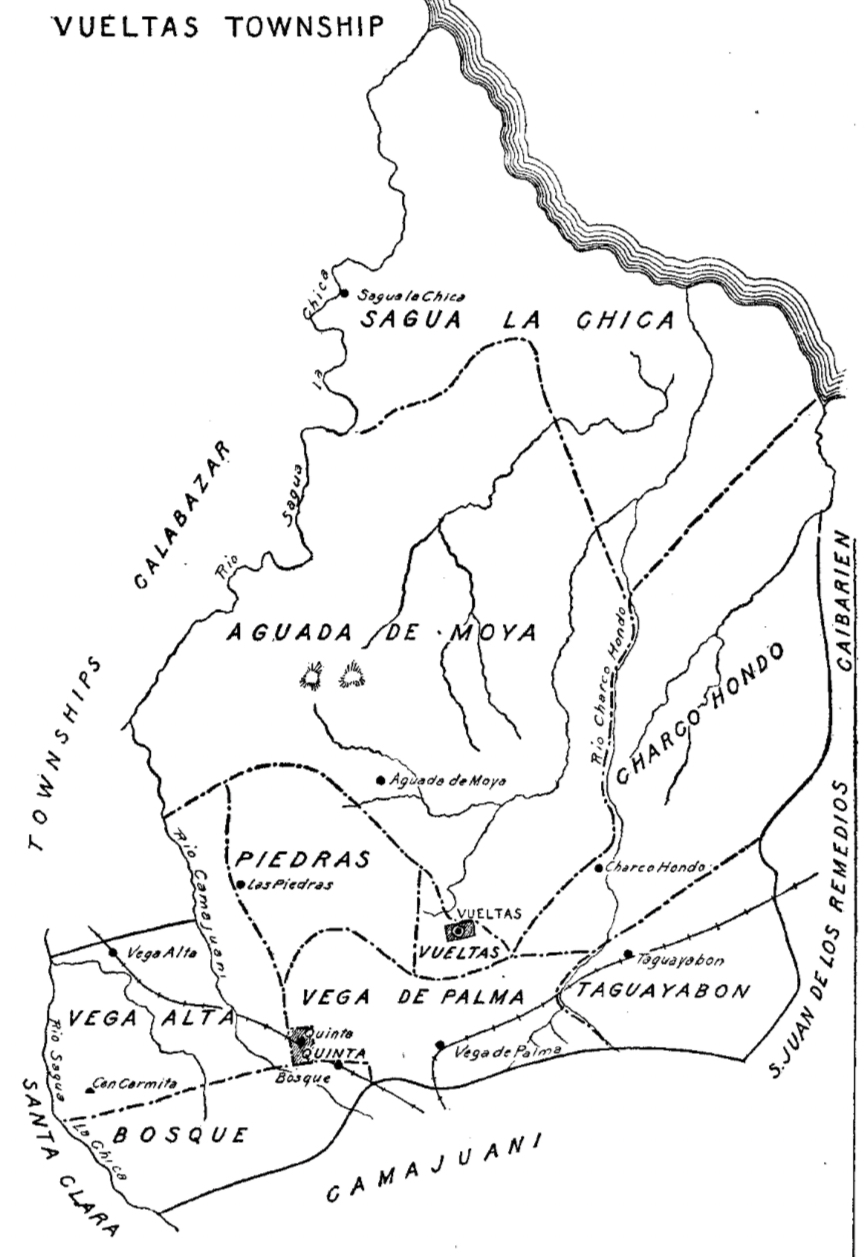
Map of Barrios of Vueltas in 1909

The village, whose name means "butterfly village" in Taíno language, has an unknown foundation date, being made before the Spanish discovered the town. Until 1976, it was a barrio of the former municipality of San Antonio de las Vueltas (or Vueltas), merged in Camajuaní.

== Geography ==
Located on a rural plain surrounded by scattered hills, between Camajuaní (7.7 km west) and Remedios (11 km east); Taguayabón spans on two main crossroads, being the Calle Rivadeneira (N-S) and the Circuito Norte (W-E). Nearest places are the villages of Palenque (3 km east), Entronque de Vueltas (3 km west) and Vega de Palma (5 km west). The village is 9 km from Vueltas, 20 from Caibarién, 26 from Placetas, 34 from Santa Clara and 80 from Cayo Santa María.

The local government area of the "Consejo Popular de Taguayabón" includes the villages of Carolina, Corea, La Julia, Las Lechugas, Lobatón, Rosalía, CCS Fidel Claro, and Palenque.

== Government ==
Camajuaní has multiple Constituency Delegate (Delegado Circunscripción) for every ward, Taguayabón’s ward has:

- Constituency Delegate #63 Javier Morffi Pérez
- Constituency Delegate #71 Rafael Gómez Morales
- Constituency Delegate #72 Rafael Gómez Morales
- Constituency Delegate #73 José A. Hernández Gómez
- Constituency Delegate #75 Roberto Cruz Ramos

== Transport ==
Taguayabón is crossed in the middle by the state highway "Circuito Norte" (CN) and counts a railway station on the line Santa Clara-Camajuaní-Remedios-Caibarién. Nearest airport, the "Abel Santamaría" of Santa Clara (IATA: SNU), is 30 km west.

== Economy ==
According at the DMPF (Departamento de control de la Dirección Municipal de Planificación Física or Management Control Department Municipal Physical Planning in English) of Camajuani, Taguayabón is a settlement linked to sources of employment or economic development.

The Provincial Tobacco Company La Estrella has territory in La Quinta, Camajuani, Aguada de Moya, San Antonio de las Vueltas, and Taguayabón.

In order to make charcoal in Camajuani you need to live in Luis Arcos Bergnes or Taguayabón.

Taguayabón gets most of its products from CPA "13 de Marzo", which is located in the ward.

== Education ==
There are a few schools in the ward of Taguayabón, these include:

- Pelayo Cuervo Primary
- ESBU Clemente Cárdenas Ávila Secondary

== Infrastructure ==
In La Quinta, Taguayabón, San Antonio de las Vueltas, and Vega de Palma there are a combined total of 13 Municipal Collection Establishment squares.

== See also ==
- Parrandas
- Municipalities of Cuba
- List of cities in Cuba
