= Vega de Palma =

- Rural settlement
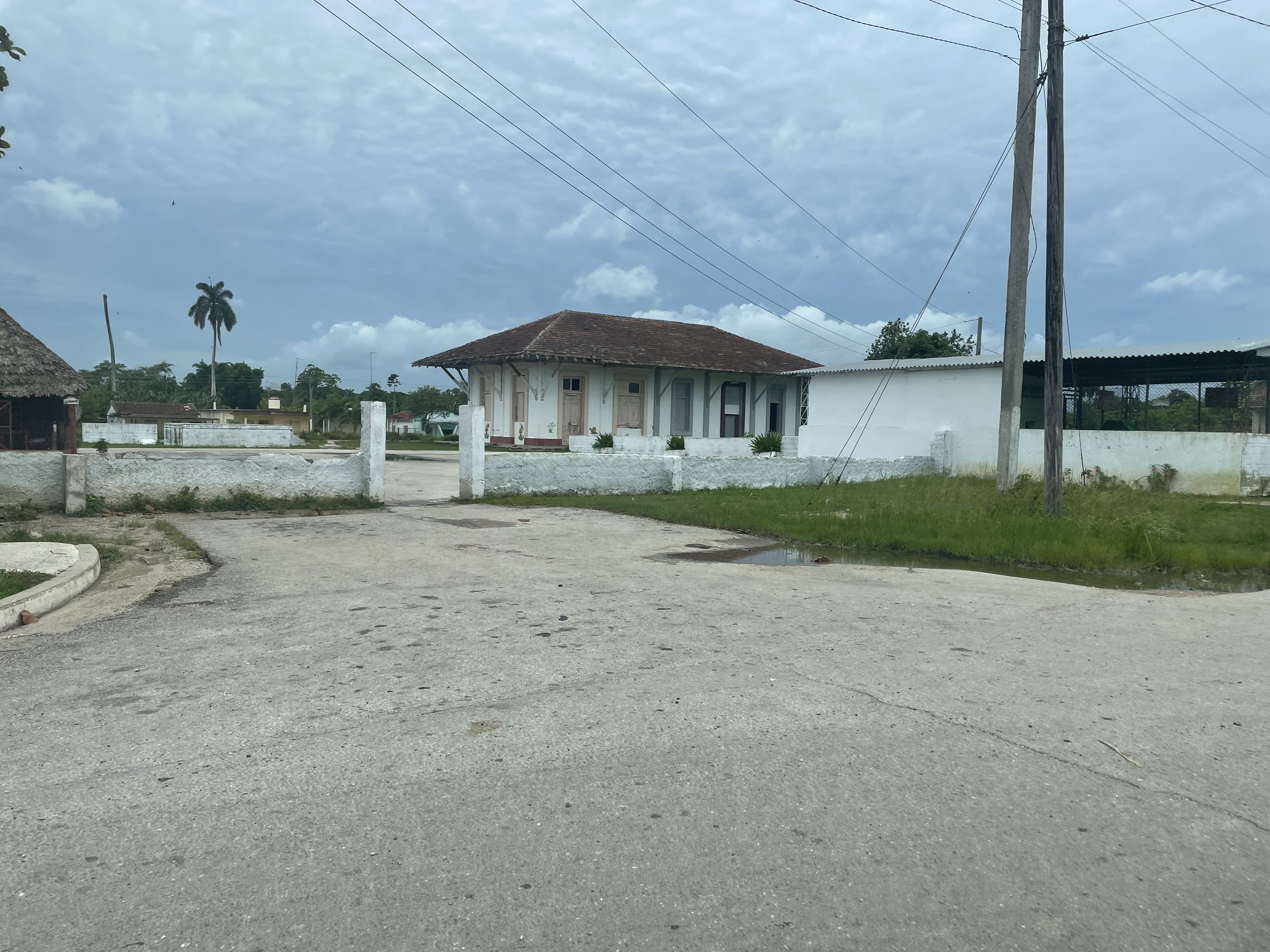
- Train station of Vega de Palma

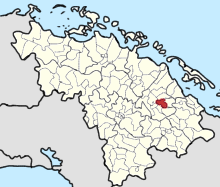
- Former ward of Vega de Palma (red) seen in Villa Clara Province

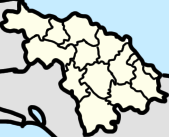
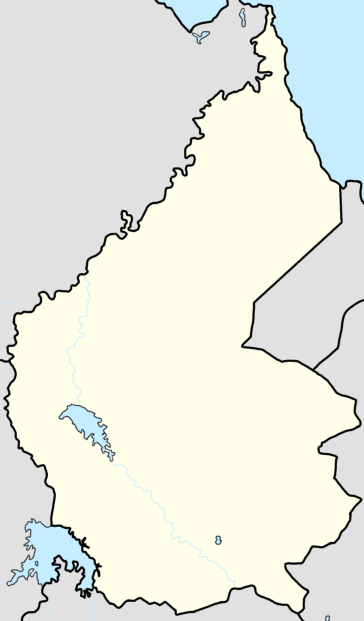
- Location within Cuba Location within Villa Clara Province Location within Camajuaní
- Coordinates: 22°29′26″N 79°41′34″W
- Country: Cuba
- Province: Villa Clara
- Municipality: Camajuaní
- Ward: San Antonio de las Vueltas
- Foundation: 1878

Area
  - Land: 0.48 km^{2} (0.19 sq mi)

Population (14 September 2012)
  - Total: 1,506
  - Density: 3,100/km^{2} (8,100/sq mi)

Vega de Palma is a rural settlement located on the Circuito Norte in Camajuaní, Cuba. The town is a part of the ward of San Antonio de las Vueltas and It is located five kilometers south of the town of San Antonio de las Vueltas.

== History ==
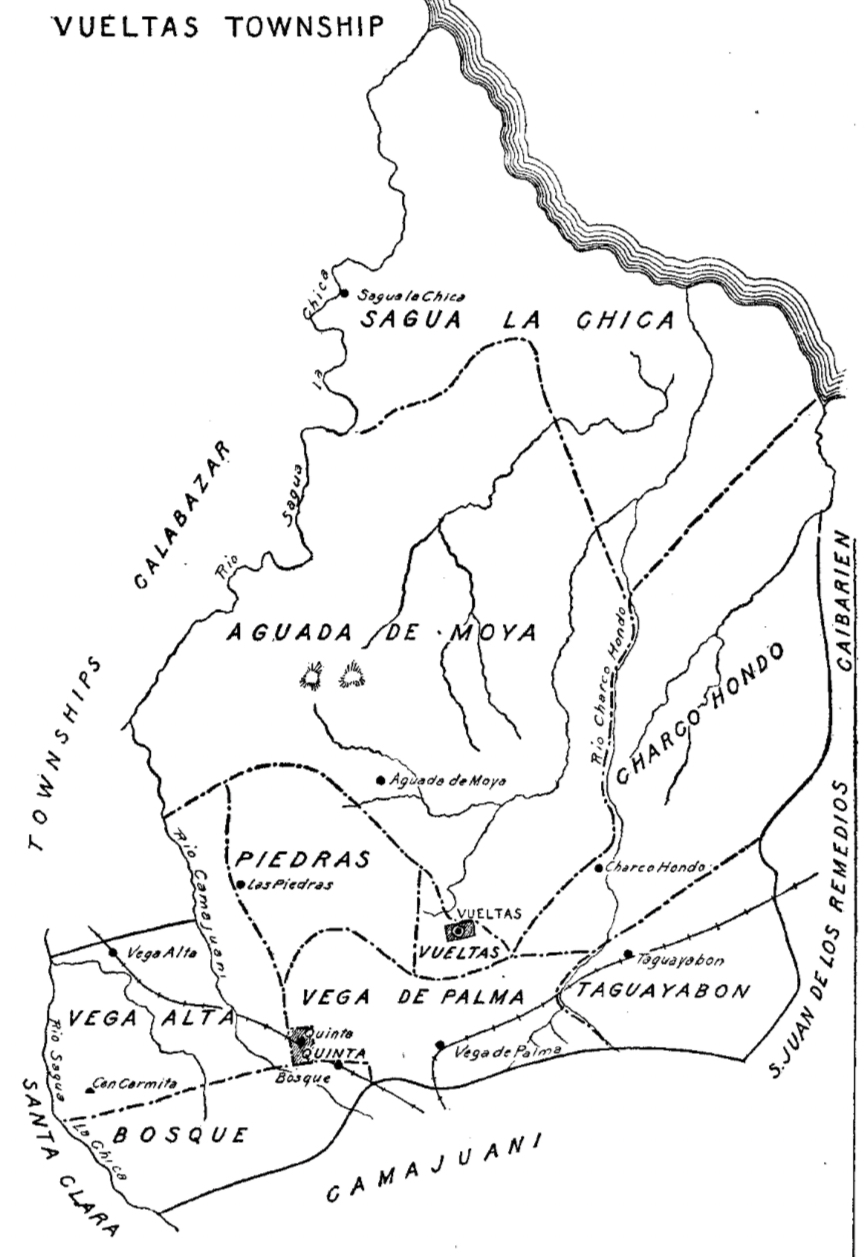
Map of Barrios of Vueltas in 1909

The town was founded in 1878 as a train stop, as a part of the former municipality of San Antonio de las Vueltas. It was also a barrio of the former municipality.

== Geography ==
The settlement in located in the ward of San Antonio de las Vueltas, on the Circuito Norte. It has a railroad which links it from Camajuaní in the west to Remedios and Caibarién in the east.

== Education ==
Vega de Palma has the Escuela Primaria (Primary School) Pity Fajardo, named after Manuel Fajardo.
