= San Antonio de las Vueltas =

San Antonio de las Vueltas Vueltas
- Village
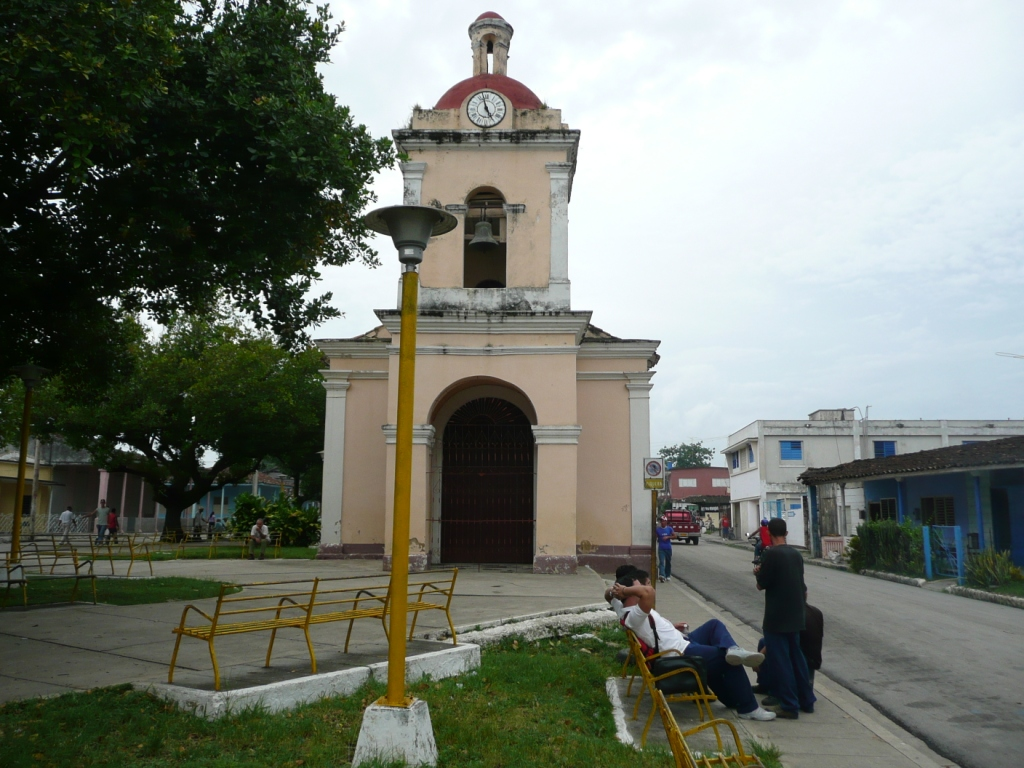
- Village church

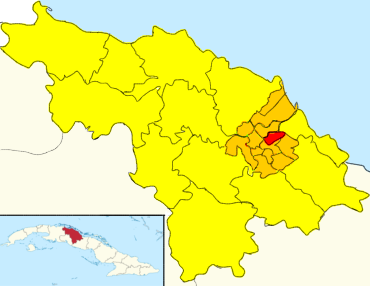
- Popular Council of Vueltas (Red) in Camajuaní (Orange) in Villa Clara (Yellow)

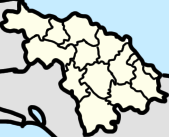
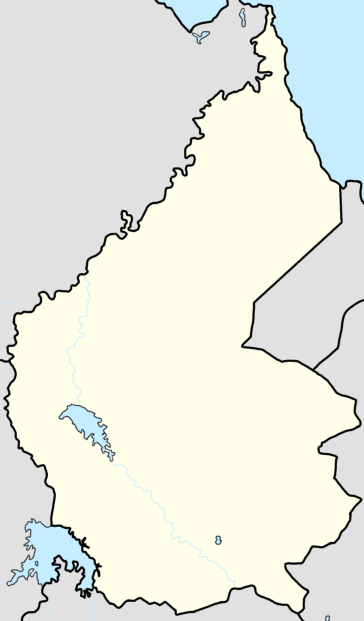
- Location of Vueltas in Cuba San Antonio de las Vueltas (Villa Clara Province) San Antonio de las Vueltas (Camajuaní)
- Coordinates: 22°31′00.1″N 79°42′07.7″W
- Country: Cuba
- Province: Villa Clara
- Municipality: Camajuaní
- Founded: 1800

Area
  - Total: 40.63 km^{2} (15.69 sq mi)

Population (2012)
  - Total: 12,110
- Demonym: Voltenses
- Time zone: UTC-5 (EST)
- Area code: +35 422
- Highways: Circuito Norte

San Antonio de las Vueltas, also known as Vueltas, is a village and consejo popular ("people's council", i.e. hamlet) in central northern Cuba, belonging to the municipality of Camajuaní, Villa Clara Province. It is the most populated village in the municipality after Camajuaní.

== History ==
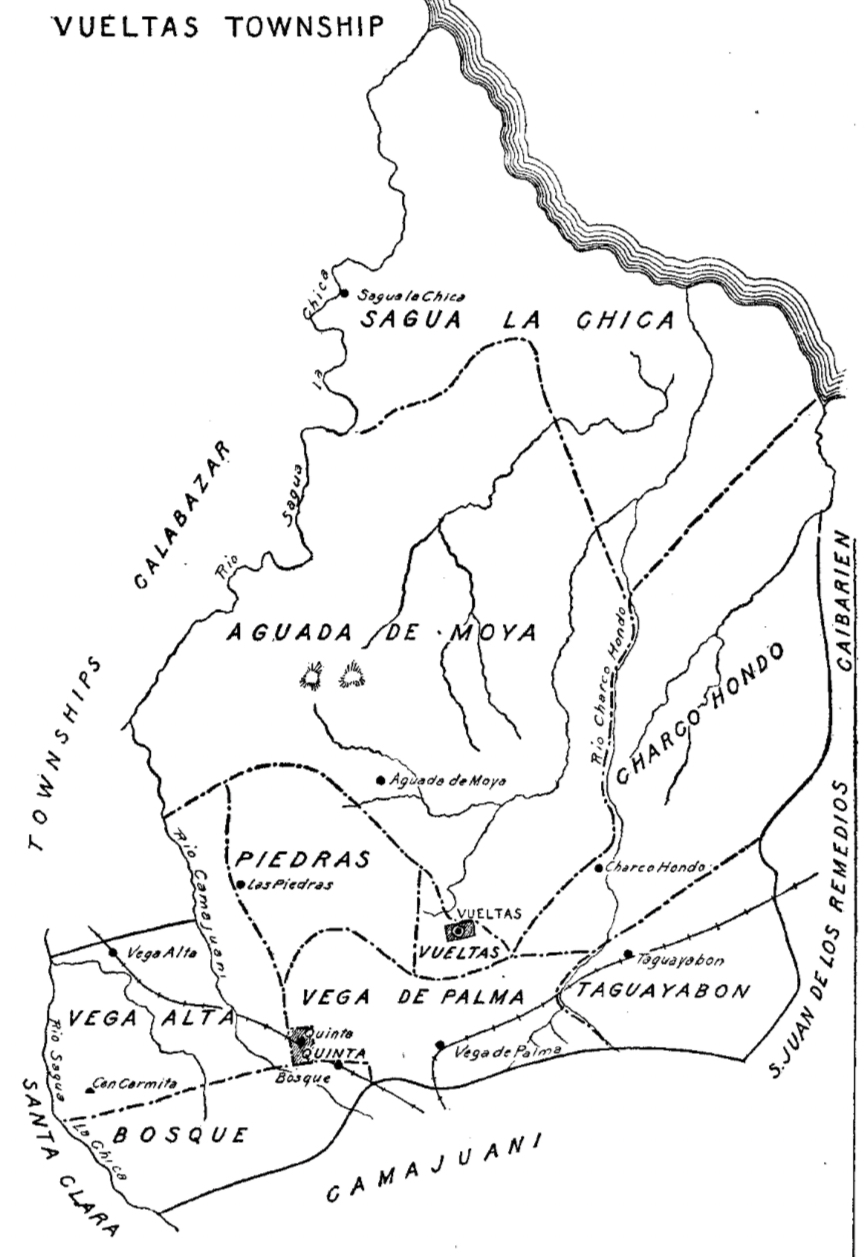
Map of Barrios of Vueltas in 1909

Until the 1976 reform it was a municipality and contained the barrios of Aguada de Moya, Bosque, Cabecera (San Antonio de las Vueltas proper), Charco Hondo, Piedra, Quinta, Sagua la Chica, Taguayabón, Vega Alta and Vega de Palma.

== Geography ==
Hills such as Mogote Colorada and Palenque dot the landscape and the Sagua la Chica River and Manacas River flow through the municipality.

The Ward of Vueltas includes the settlements of Vueltas, Vega de Palma, La Guinea, Júcaro, and more.

== Transport ==
Vueltas is crossed in the middle by the state highway "Circuito Norte" (CN), and has a railway station (Vueltas-Vega de Palma), in the nearby village of Vega de Palma, on the line Santa Clara-Camajuaní-Remedios-Caibarién.

== Education ==
Schools in Vueltas include:

- Santos Caraballé Primary
- Camila Sobrado Primary
- ESBU Rubén Martínez Villena Secondary
- Centro Mixto Andrés Cuevas Heredia Secondary
- IPS Fabricio Ojeda Technology School

== Economy ==
According at the DMPF (Departamento de control de la Dirección Municipal de Planificación Física or Management Control Department Municipal Physical Planning in English) of Camajuani, Vueltas is a settlement linked to sources of employment or economic development.

The Provincial Tobacco Company La Estrella has territory in La Quinta, Camajuani, Aguada de Moya, San Antonio de las Vueltas, and Taguayabón.

The Villa Clara Meat Company has the UEB Empacadora Osvaldo Herrera, which packages meat, in Vueltas.

== Infrastructure ==
In La Quinta, Taguayabón, San Antonio de las Vueltas, and Vega de Palma there are a combined total of 13 Municipal Collection Establishment squares. There is also one Twisted Factory in Vueltas.

== Personalities ==
The First Vice President of Cuba, José Ramón Machado Ventura was born in the town in 1930.

== See also ==
- Parrandas
- Municipalities of Cuba
- List of cities in Cuba
