= Batalla de Santa Clara =

Battle of Santa Clara Batalla de Santa Clara
- Ward
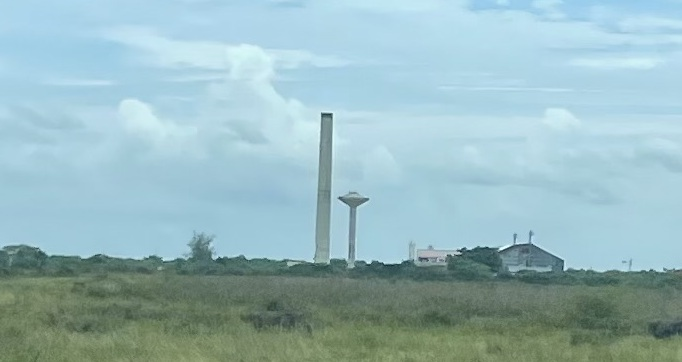
- Batalla de Santa Clara sugar mill

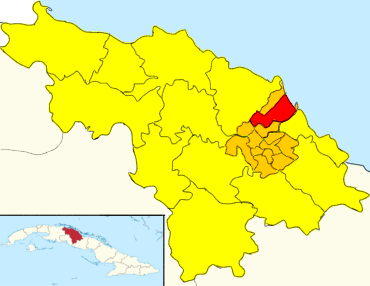
- Batalla de Santa Clara seen in red

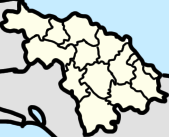
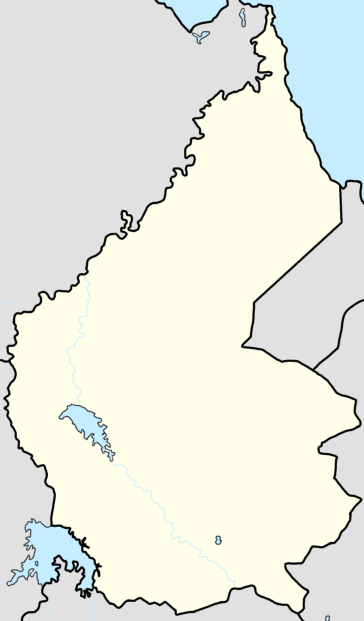
- Location within Cuba Location within Villa Clara Province Location within Camajuaní
- Coordinates: 22°37′N 79°41′W
- Country: Cuba
- Province: Villa Clara
- Municipality: Camajuaní

Batalla de Santa Clara is a ward located in the north of the municipality of Camajuaní in Villa Clara Province, Cuba. The ward includes the villages of Jutiero, Macagual, and Sagua la Chica, with other smaller settlements spread throughout. The ward is named after the Battle of Santa Clara (Batalla de Santa Clara), the last battle in the Cuban Revolution to make the government of Cuba surrender. The ward is the largest ward of the municipality, having mostly farmland.

== Geography ==
Settlements in the ward include:

- Macagual
- Jutiero (officially Chiqui Gomez)
- Puente Pavon
- Roberto Rodríguez
- La Pedrera
- Macagualito
- Camacho
- La Luisa
- Pirindingo
- Sagua la Chica (formerly its own independent ward)
- Playa Juan Francisco (formerly part of the ward of Sagua la Chica)
- Cere (formerly part of the ward of Sagua la Chica)
- Cotica (formerly part of the ward of Sagua la Chica)
- Puntilla (formerly part of the ward of Sagua la Chica)
- UBPC Crescencio Valdés (formerly part of the ward of Sagua la Chica)

== Economy ==
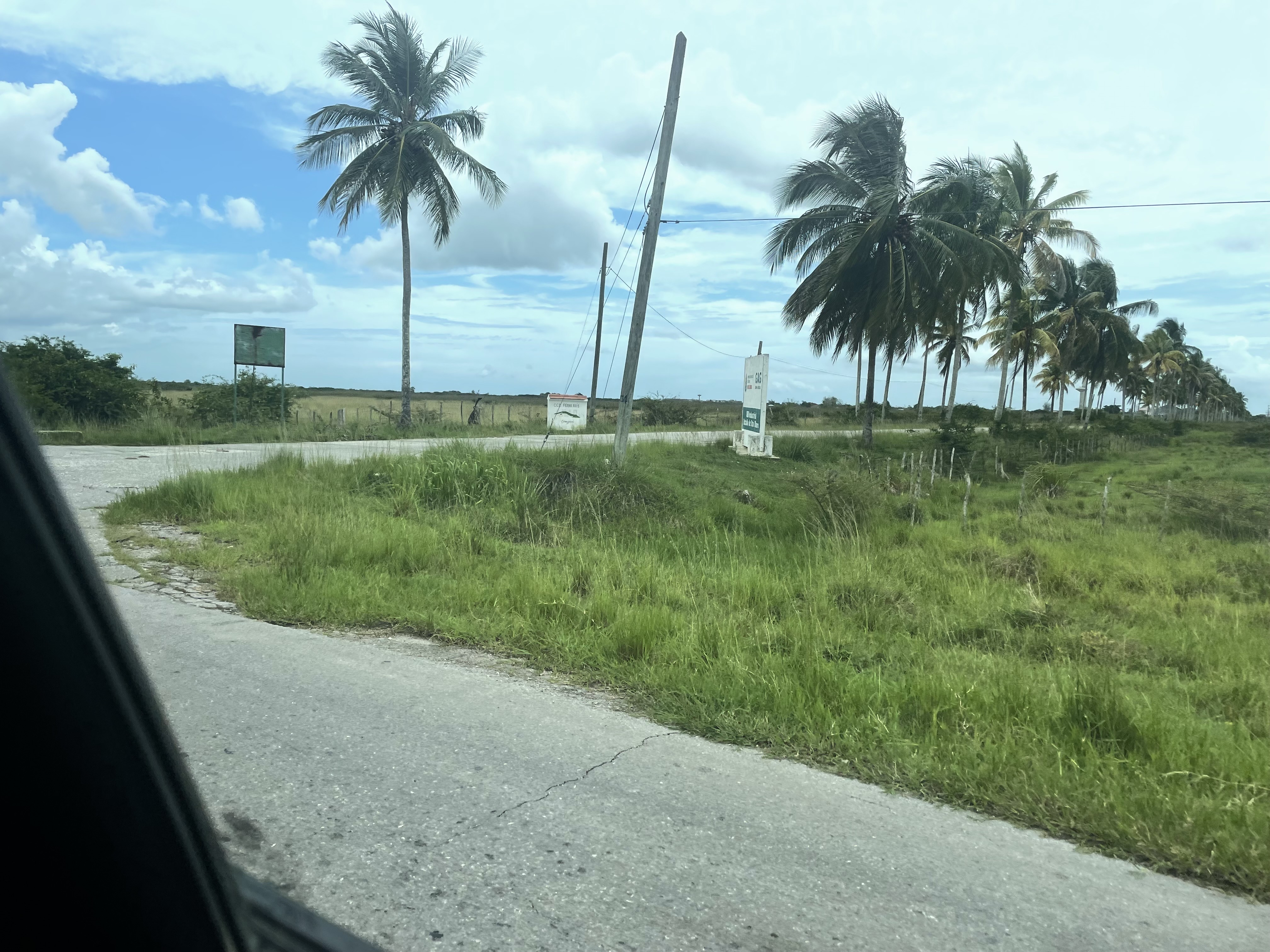
CCS Frank Pais and the UEB Industrial Batalla de Santa Clara

The ward formerly had the CAI (Complejo AgroIndustrial) Batalla de Santa Clara in the Circuito Norte, which was the biggest economic place in the area. Now the ward has the CCS Frank Pais, UEB Industrial Batalla de Santa Clara, the UBPC Crescencio Valdés, and more. The ward also has the airfield of Aeródromo Agrícola Jutiero, located northwest of the town of Jutiero, which it is named after.

== Politics ==
The ward has the Delegado Circunscripción (Constituency Delegate) of:

- Elier Hernández Carvajal #13
- Esteban Castro Leiva #21
- Manuel Yanes Arbelo #22
- Lino Ramón Vázquez Pérez #24
- Antonio R. Acosta González #31
