= Remedios, Cuba =

Remedios San Juan de los Remedios
- Municipality
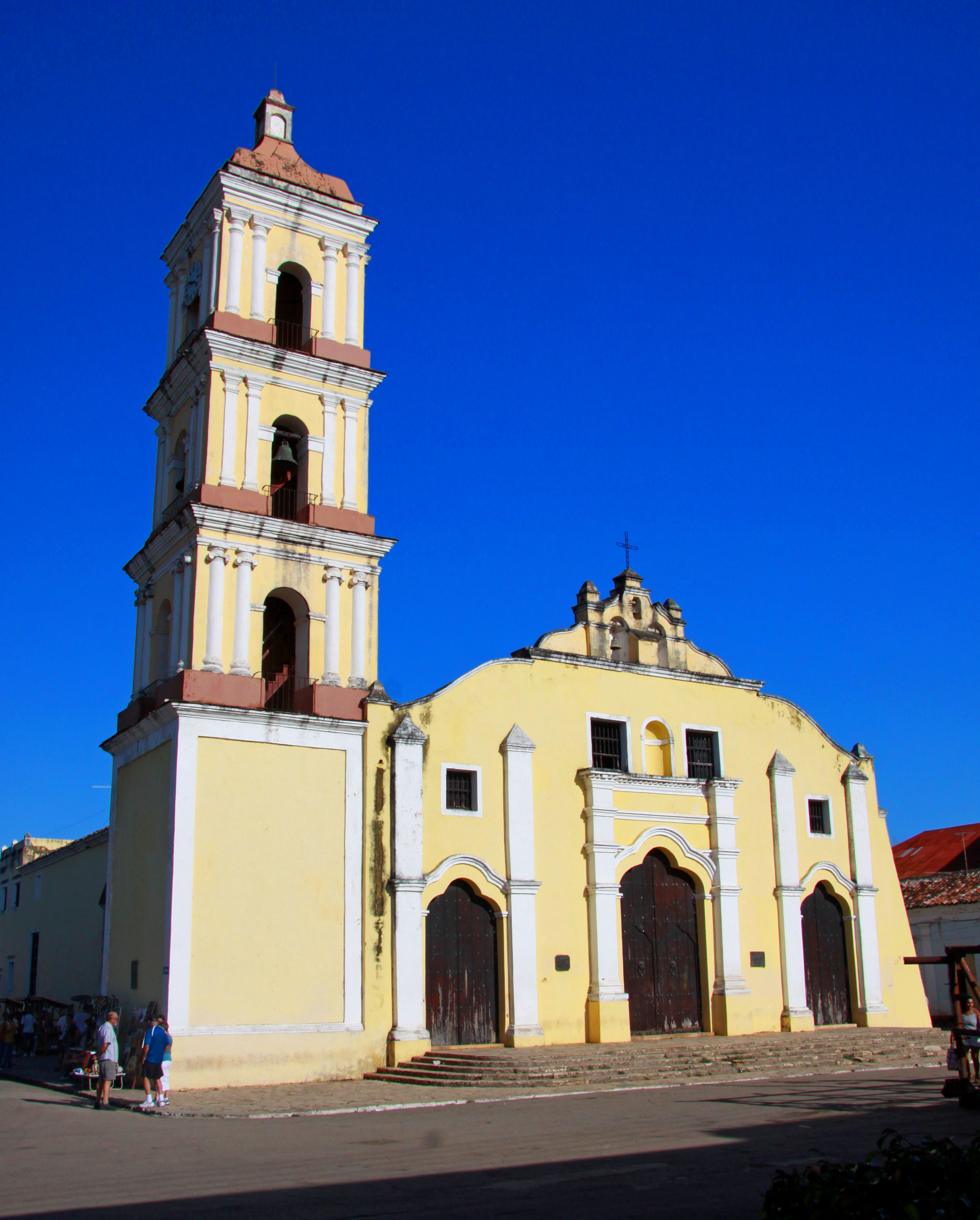
- Iglesia Mayor in Remedios

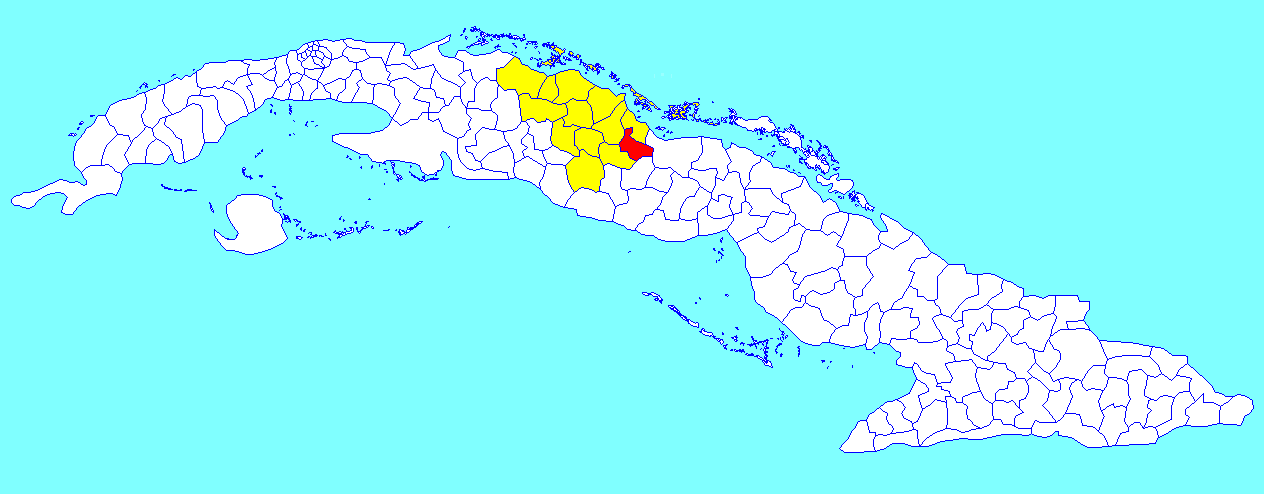
- Remedios municipality (red) within Villa Clara Province (yellow) and Cuba
- Coordinates: 22°29′32″N 79°32′45″W
- Country: Cuba
- Province: Villa Clara
- Established: 1513

Area
  - Municipality: 560 km^{2} (220 sq mi)
- Elevation: 25 m (82 ft)

Population (2022)
  - Municipality: 42,134
  - Density: 75/km^{2} (190/sq mi)
  - Urban: 28,332
  - Rural: 13,802
- Time zone: UTC-5 (EST)
- Area code: +53-42-39

Remedios (Spanish pronunciation: [reˈmeðjos]), also known as San Juan de los Remedios, is a city and municipality located 5 km (3 mi) from the northern coast of Cuba, in the center of the island. It is the oldest Spanish settlement in the former Las Villas province. It is now part of the province of Villa Clara.

It was declared a City by Isabella II of Spain, when the island was still a colony. Remedios is known as the Cradle of the Parrandas, possibly the Caribbean's largest and oldest traditional festival. Its patrons are John the Baptist and the Virgin of the Buenviaje.

== Geography ==
Remedios is located about 4 hours by bus from Havana, and around 50 minutes from Santa Clara. It is less than an hour from here to beach resorts in the Santa María – Las Brujas cays, both situated north of the province. The municipality is bordered on the north by Caibarién, to the south by Camajuaní and Placetas, and to the east by Yaguajay (in Sancti Spíritus Province). Remedios has 10 consejos populares which include: El Carmén, San Salvador, and Hermanos Herrada, in the city of Remedios and nearby settlements, and Heriberto Duquesne, Buena Vista, General Carrillo, Zulueta, Tahón-Francisco Pérez, Remate de Ariosa, and Circunscripciónes Directas (Chiquito Fabregat or San Agustín).

== History ==
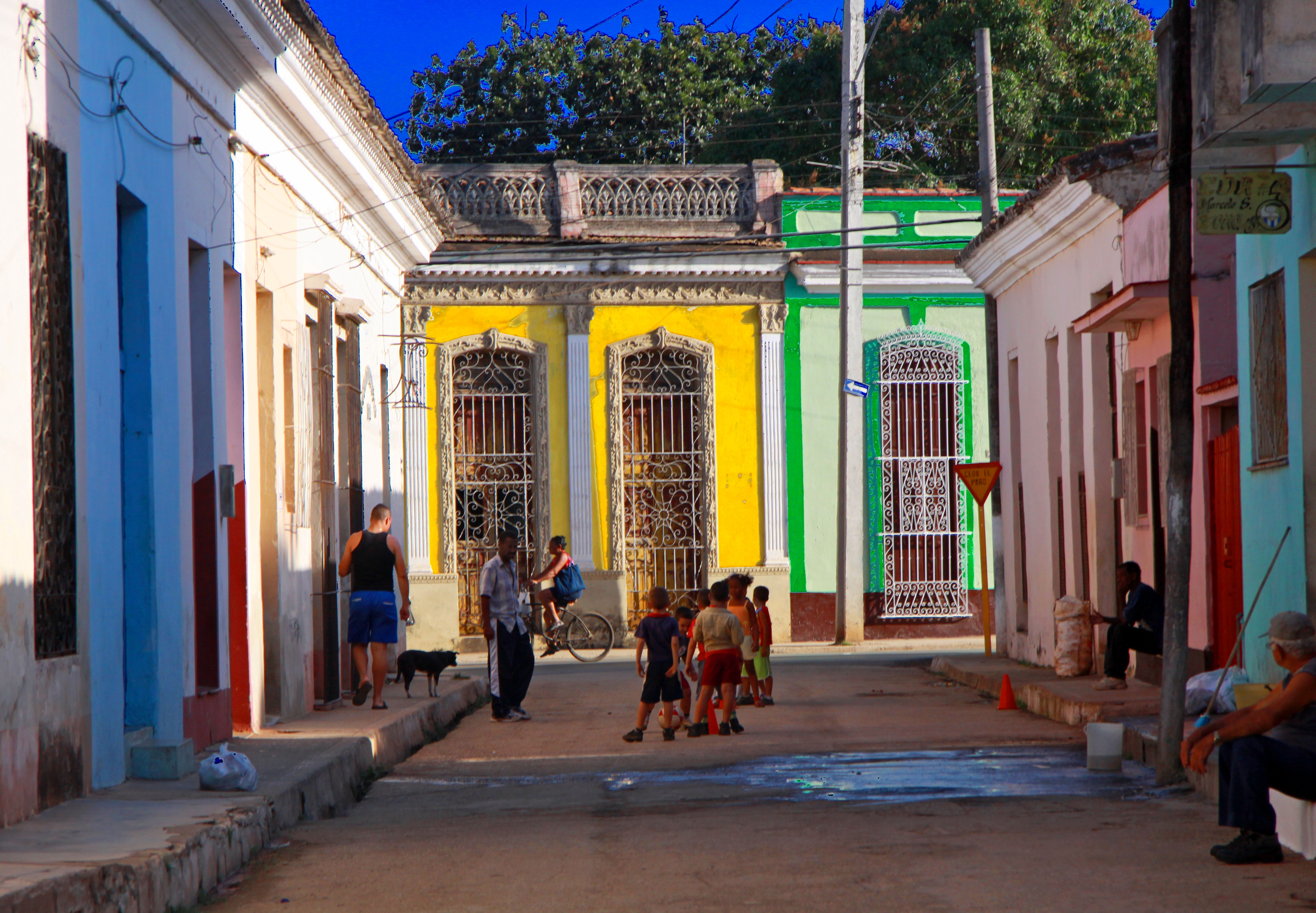
Colonial houses in Remedios

This is recognized as the eighth-oldest European city in Cuba, but its real date of foundation has been obscured over time. It may be the second Spanish settlement on the island. Historians place the foundation date sometime between 1513 and 1524 by Spanish nobleman Vasco Porcallo de Figueroa. He was said to found the settlement on 13 April 1514. Documents reflect that this settlement had been preceded on the island only by Baracoa (1511) and Bayamo (1512).

Some believe that it was founded before Trinidad (1514). According to legend, Vasco, in order to avoid tax payments to the Crown, kept the village hidden from the knowledge of the King of Spain as long as he could. But the settlement grew and had to be recognized. Through his wife, the daughter of the Cacique of Sabaneque, Vasco received a huge land grant as a personal fief from Governor Diego Velázquez de Cuéllar, as stipulated by Spanish law. There was no municipal entity to govern the town. Upon Vasco's death in Puerto Principe in 1550, the town obtained its charter.

It was originally called Santa Cruz de la Sabana. Other names were Santa Cruz de Vasco Porcallo, Santa Cruz de la Sabana del Cayo, and lastly, by 1578, San Juan de los Remedios de la Sabana del Cayo. In the 16th, 17th and 18th centuries, land grants provided by the Crown to colonists allowed for a stable population settlement. The economic growth relied on agriculture and cattle raising, and this eventually became one of the major beef suppliers to Spain's Florida colonies.

By 1678 the demarcation between Remedios and Sancti Spiritus was established. Along with cattle raising, the sugar cane industry was developed, dependent on slave labor. By the end of the 17th and beginning of the 18th century, the cultivation of tobacco, coffee and cacao as commodity crops was also underway.

In 1682 (1672?), a major dispute arose among the settlers, led by Father Gonzalez de la Cruz, who claimed that satanic forces had taken hold of the place. The Spanish Crown sent a Royal Decree dated 29 January 1684 transferring the settlement to another place in order to avoid the demons. Eighteen families left the town and on 15 July 1689 established the village of Santa Clara. Today this is an important city in the center of Cuba and the capital of the province of Villa Clara.

The long history of Remedios is particularly evident in the city center (declared a National Historic Monument in 1980). There 17th-century Spanish architecture can still be found intact.

== Demographics ==
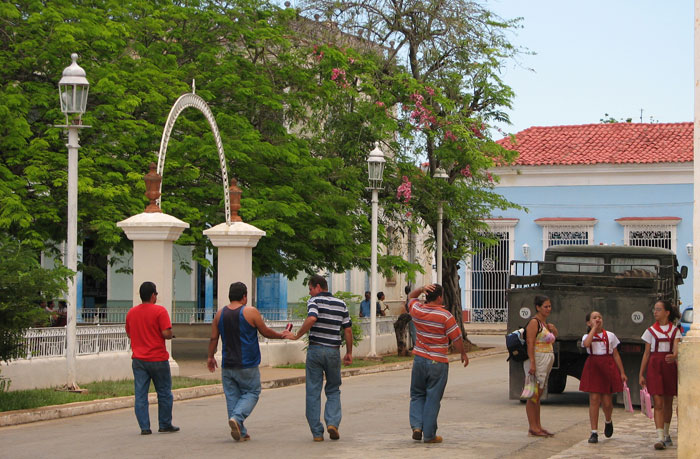
Pedestrians in Remedios

In 2004, the municipality of Remedios had a population of 46,482. With a total area of 560 km^{2} (220 sq mi), it has a population density of 83.0/km^{2} (215/sq mi). In 2022 the population number had dropped to 42,134.

== Attractions ==
=== Iglesia Mayor and Plaza Isabel II ===
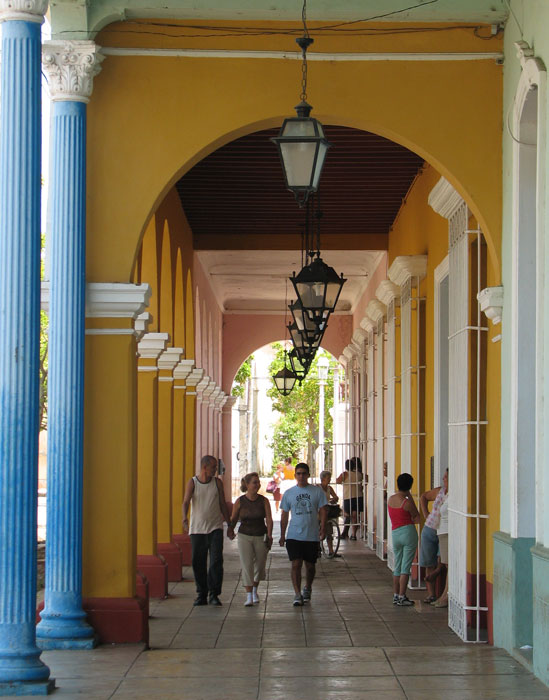
Colonial buildings in main square

The main attraction in the Plaza Isabel II is the Iglesia Mayor of San Juan Bautista, containing 13 decorated gold altars. As the city was frequently raided by pirates and corsairs, the gold was hidden under white paint. The most famous pirate to attack the town was the French François l'Olonnais.

In a renovation that took place between 1944 and 1954, with donations by Cuban millionaire philanthropist Eutimio Falla Bonet, the real gold under coats of paint was re-discovered. Falla Bonet was said to have traced his ancestors back to Remedios, where one was a founding member of the city and another was born in Remedios. On the north side of the square sits another church, Igesia del Buen Viaje. Remedios is the only town in Cuba with two churches on its main square, but the Iglesia del Buen Viaje has been abandoned. It is leaking and closed until repairs are authorized by the government.

The Central Plaza or Plaza Mayor was restored in 1970. It is surrounded by colonial buildings, beautiful monuments, trees, palms and a gazebo, like many towns in Cuba that were designed according to a Spanish urban standard.

=== Parrandas ===
Many Cubans consider Remedios distinguished for its Christmas festival, Las Parrandas de Remedios,, one of the most popular regional events It takes place annually between the 16th to the 26th of December every year. Considered the oldest festival in Cuba, the parrandas were initially promoted by Father Francisco Vigil de Quiñones, who used to officiate at the Iglesia Mayor of San Juan Bautista de los Remedios. The priest, who was concerned about the absence of parishioners at the Misa de Gallo (midnight mass), decided to encourage children to parade in the streets and wake up residents by using whistles, horns and tin cans, so that they had no other choice than to get up and attend Christmas Eve mass. That noisy initiative got deeply rooted among the people, and a festival developed around it.

In 1871, the "parrandas" adopted a ritual that is still practiced. According to tradition, when the bells of the Iglesia Parroquial Mayor (Major Parochial Church) toll at 9 o'clock on the night of December 24, two neighborhoods make public their creativeness and efforts made during the entire year to participate in the competition. During the "parrandas", a fierce competition takes place between the neighborhoods of San Salvador, represented by the colors red and blue, and a rooster as a symbol, and El Carmen, represented by the color brown and a globe. The memory of those celebrations is compiled at the Museum of Parrandas, which opened in 1980 in a 19th-century building in Remedios. It preserves photos, documents and hand-made objects linked to the festivities.

== Notable figures ==
- Alejandro García Caturla (1906–1940), composer
- Federico Laredo Brú, lawyer and politician
- Jorge Luis Toca (b. 1975), former professional baseball player
- Dayán Viciedo Pérez (b. 1989), professional baseball player
- Yosver Zulueta (b. 1998), professional baseball player

== Sister cities ==
- Ann Arbor, United States
- La Orotava, Canary Islands, Spain
- (United States) Normal, Illinois

== See also ==
- Municipalities of Cuba
- List of cities in Cuba
