= Camajuaní =

- Municipality
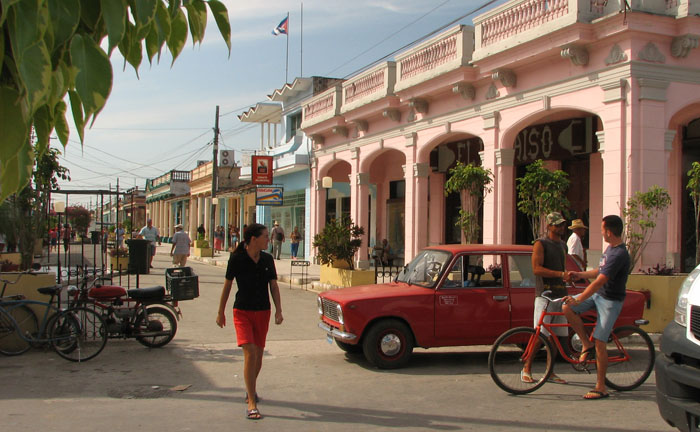
- Eclectic architecture in a Camajuani street

- Coat of arms

- Camajuaní municipality (red) within Villa Clara Province (yellow) and Cuba
- Coordinates: 22°28′4″N 79°43′26″W
- Country: Cuba
- Province: Villa Clara
- Settled (Corral): 1703
- Became a Homestead: 1735
- Founded: 1864
- Incorporated: 1876 (town); 1879 (municipality)

Government
  - Type: Asamblea Municipal del Poder Popular (AMPP)
  - President: Ana Delia García Darias
  - Vice-President: Yamirka Torres Granela

Area
  - Municipality: 585.71 km^{2} (226.14 sq mi)
- Elevation: 115 m (377 ft)

Population (2021)
  - Municipality: 57,600
  - Density: 103.5/km^{2} (268/sq mi)
  - Urban: 37,866
  - Rural: 19,734
- Time zone: UTC-5 (EST)
- Postcode: 52500
- Area code: +53-422
- Website: https://www.soycamajuani.gob.cu/es/

Camajuaní is a municipality and town in the Villa Clara Province of Cuba.

== History ==
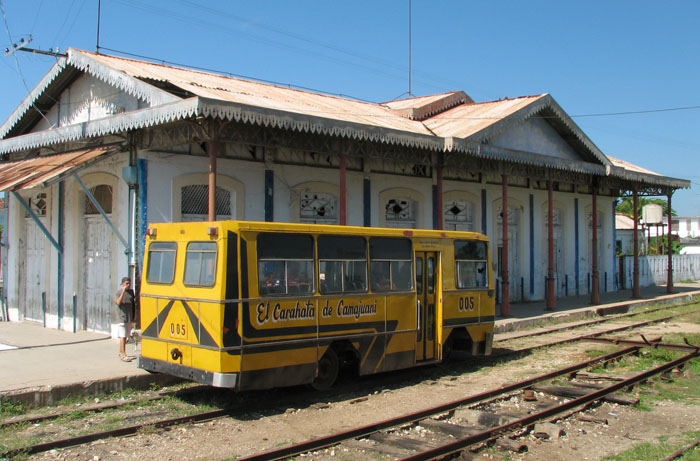
The old train station

In 1819 was decided the construction of a new port near Caibarién to replace an old one located in Tesisco. From that moment, settlers established in the surroundings creating a new village. In 1832 blueprints for the new town of Caibarien were presented, and finally in 1841 this city was founded. Consequently, in 1864 an extension of the railway was planned in order to bring the sugar from the Camajuani valley to Caibarien and a new settlement began near the train station. This is the starting point and birth of Camajuaní village.

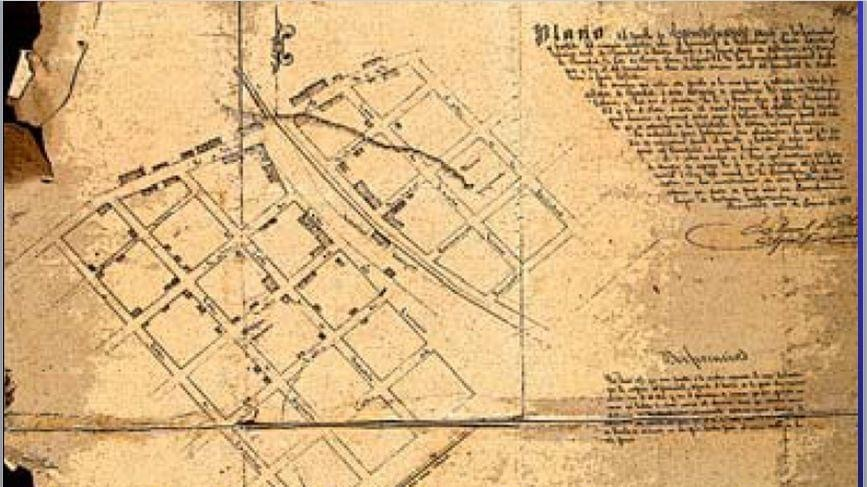
Planned map of Camajuaní in 1877

January 1, 1871 Camajuani was declared a municipality and on August 1, 1879 the city hall was established. The first mayor of the villa was Hipólito Escobar Martelo.

In the 1907 census Zulueta, which was a barrio at the time was switched from being a part of the municipality of Camajuaní to Remedios. In 1909 Camajuaní was split into the barrios of Egido (main city of Camajuaní), Santa Fe, Sabana, Santa Clarita (including Falcón), Guadalupe, and Salamanca (including José María Pérez).

In 1976, the former municipal territories of San Antonio de las Vueltas was given to the municipality of Camajuaní.

== Geography ==
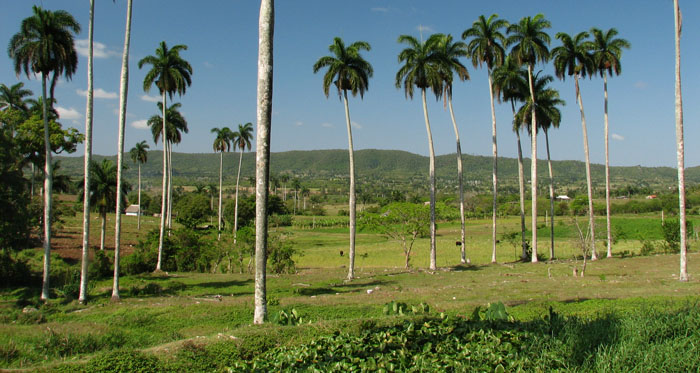
Camajuaní Valley

Camajuaní is located in a valley, surrounded by an old range. Predominantly the city lies in a flat terrain. With the same name, the Camajuani river passes near the city, and Sagua la Chica river also passes through the region, playing both an important role in the fertility of the municipality.

The municipality is divided into 9 consejos populares (i.e. "popular councils"): the main town of Camajuaní (municipal seat, divided in C. I and C. II), and the villages of Aguada de Moya, José María Pérez, Luis Arcos Bergnes (or Carmita), San Antonio de las Vueltas (or Vueltas), Taguayabón, Vega Alta, and Batalla de Santa Clara. (Note: The Camajuani official website says 9, but other sources say 13. ex.)

== Demographics ==
In 2004, the municipality of Camajuaní had a population of 63,544. With a total area of 614 km^{2} (237 sq mi), it has a population density of 103.5/km^{2} (268/sq mi).

== Economy ==
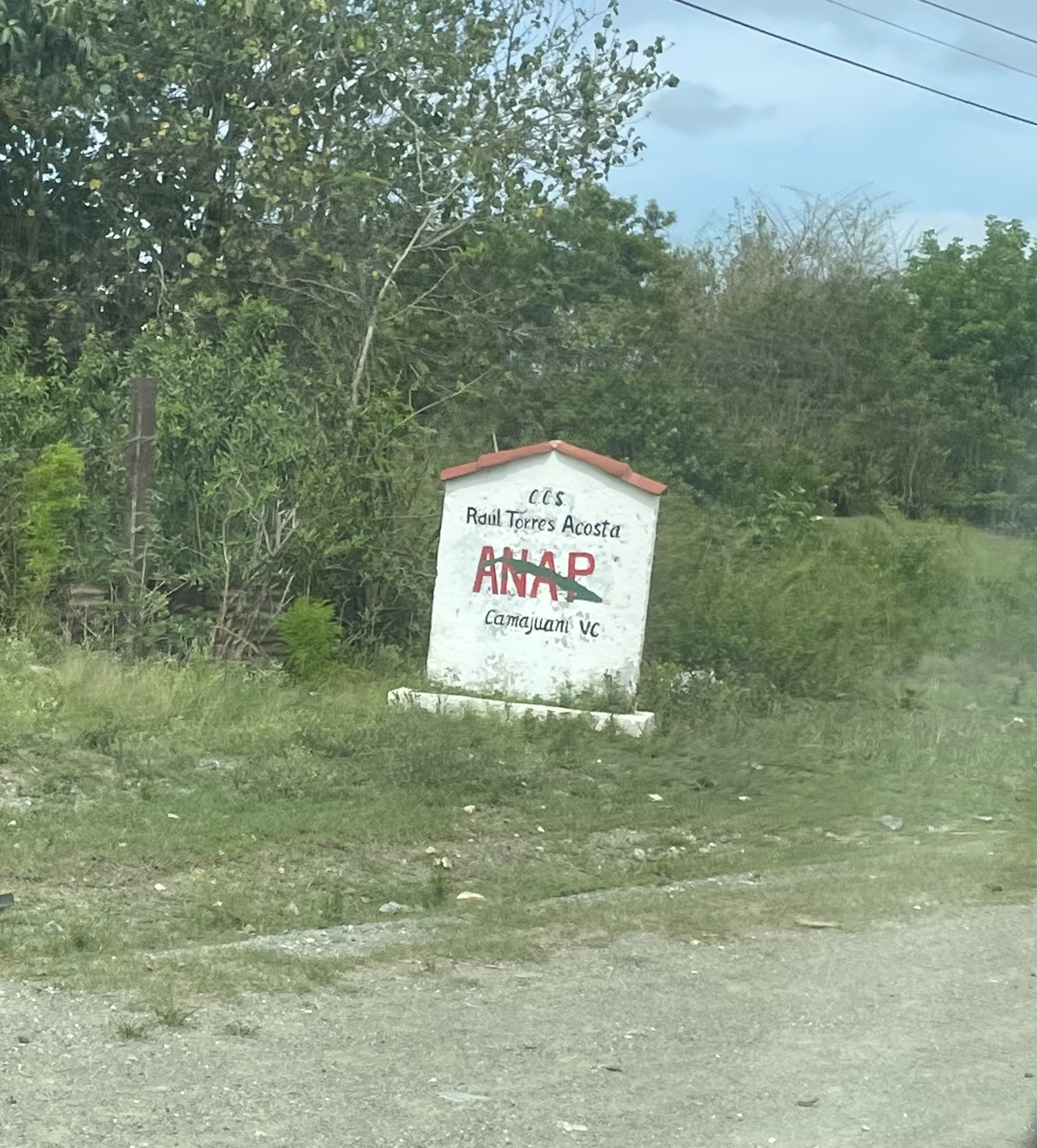
CCS Raúl Torres Acosta in Vega Alta

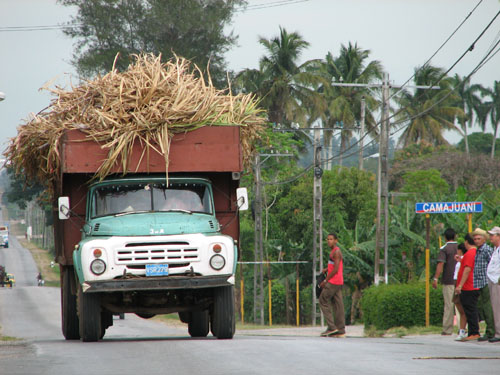
Sugarcane truck passing through Camajuaní

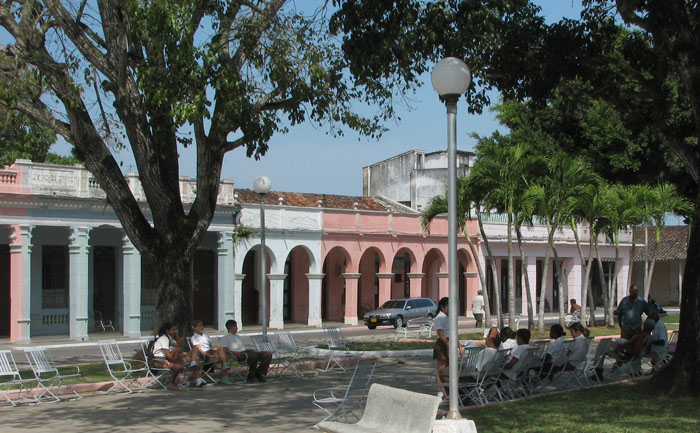
Camajuaní's "Prado" avenue

Main economic activity is agricultural in nature, sugarcane and high quality tobacco have been key.

The foundation of the town was a natural consequence of the establishment of train station constructed by "Ferrocarriles Unidos de Caibarién", (United Railways of Caibarién) in 1864, this node connected the valley where the city now is with the port in Caibarien at the North, Santa Clara on the South, Vega Alta and Placetas west and east respectively. The valley soon gain agricultural importance with important productions of Tobacco and Sugar. Most of the biggest sugar mills in the island were located in the Camajuani region, and its productions were exported to the rest of the country and the world using this port located in the near coastal city of Caibarien.

Camajuaní’s cooperatives include 17 UBPC, 33 CCS, and 15 CPA. Major cooperatives include CPA Benito Ramirez in CP Vega Alta, UBPC Crescencio Valdés in CP Batalla de Santa Clara, CPA Roberto Rodríguez in CP Batalla de Santa Clara, CCS Julio Antonio Mella in Guajén, CP Aguada de Moya, and much more.

== Culture ==
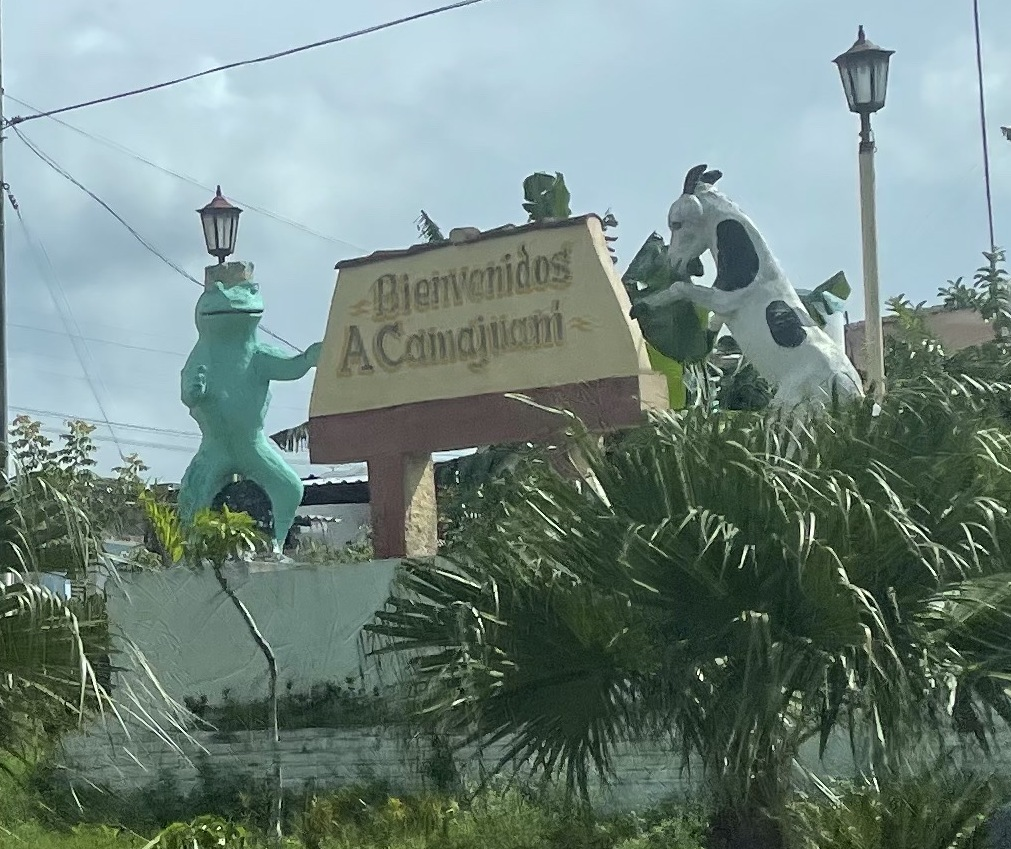
Welcome sign in Camajuaní, with the Sapos y Chivas (Toads and Goats), which represents the parrandas of Camajuaní

Camajuaní along with Remedios, Vueltas, Taguayabón and Caibarien, all located in the same region and just few kilometers from one each other are famous due to the parrandas, a carnival like party with origins date back to the 18th century. Every Parranda has its own difference in every town, but they share some similarities as well; like division of the population in two neighborhoods that compete each year in best decorative flat, plaza works or "Wall of lights" (a structure meant to support a display of lights or fireworks), traditional dance and fireworks display. In the case of Camajuani the city is divided in Chivos (Goats) and Sapos (Toads).

== Transportation ==
Camajuaní has 3 total state highways, being Highway 4–321, from Crucero Carmita–Camajuaní–Taguayabón–Palenque, Highway 4–401, from Camajuaní–José María Pérez, and the Highway 4–I–3, from Pavón–Vueltas–Taguayabón–Palenque, with other paved and unpaved roads linking other towns.

== Notable people ==
- Juan Bruno Zayas, lived in La Quinta and Vega Alta
- Leoncio Vidal, lived in Camilo Cienfuegos St, Camajuaní I,
- María Matilde Alea Fernández, born in Camajuaní
- Amaury Gutiérrez, born in Vueltas
- Alberto Herrera Franchi, born in Vueltas
- José Ramón Machado Ventura, born in Vueltas
- Carlos Mendieta, born in Vueltas
- Raúl Planas, born in Camajuaní
- Isabel Toledo, born in Camajuaní

== See also ==
- Municipalities of Cuba
- List of cities in Cuba
