= 1931 Census =

The 1931 Census or census of 1931 may refer to:

- 1931 Canadian census
- 1931 Cuba census
- 1931 census of India
- 1931 census of Palestine
- 1931 Polish census
- 1931 United Kingdom census
- Yugoslav census of 1931
  - 1931 population census in Bosnia and Herzegovina
