= 1931 Cuba census =

Twelfth Census of the Republic of Cuba
- 21 September 1931; 94 years ago

General information
- Country: Republic of Cuba
- Topics: Census topics: Location; Sex and gender; Population and households; Country of birth; Religion; Race or color; Age structure; Health; Housing
- Authority: Oficina Nacional de Estadística e Información (ONEI)
- Website: www.onei.gob.cu

Results
- Total population: 3,962,344 (▲2.61%)
- Most populous province: Oriente (1,072,757)
- Least populous province: Matanzas (337,119)

The 1931 Cuba census was the twelfth national population census held in the Republic of Cuba. The day used for the census was 21 September 1931. The census revealed a total population of 3,962,344, - an overall increase of 1,073,340 people, and an average increase of 2.61% per year over the 1919 census figure.

== Population ==
Population count by Cuban province:

Provinces	Males	Females	Population	Pp %
Pinar del Río	179,570	163,910	343,480	8.6
Havana	510,338	475,162	985,500	24.9
Matanzas	176,358	160,761	337,119	8.5
Santa Clara	428,976	386,436	815,412	20.6
Camagüey	235,316	171,760	408,076	10.3
Oriente	571,062	501,695	1,072,757	27.1
Republic of Cuba	2,102,620	1,859,724	3,962,344	100.0

== Birthplace ==
The number of people living in Cuba who were foreign-born continued to climb in absolute numbers but slightly declined by percentage from the previous census. In 1931, 436,897 people (11.0 percent) were born outside of Cuba.

Proportion of foreign-born.
1. Spain (59.0%)
2. Haiti (17.9%)
3. Other Americas (10.0%)
4. China (5.60%)
5. United States (1.60%)
6. England (0.70%)
7. Africa (0.20%)
8. Other (5.00%)

The totals were as follows.

Country	Population	Percent (%)
Cuba	3,525,447	89.0
Totals, Foreign-born	436,897	11.0
Europe	274,303	6.93
Spain	257,596	6.50
England	3,095	-
Poland	2,660	-
France	1,495	-
Italy	1,178	-
Germany	839	-
Other European	7,440	-
Africa	861	-
America	128,890	3.25
(United Kingdom) English possessions	28,206	-
Haiti	77,535	-
United States	7,195	-
United States possessions	4,911	-
Mexico	3,352	-
Other America	7,691	-
Asia	31,376	-
China	24,647	-
Other Asia	6,729	-
Not-identified	1,467	-
Republic of Cuba	3,962,344	100.0

== Racial groups ==
Race	Males	Females	Population	Percent
White	1,501,683	1,355,275	2,856,956	72.1
Black	255,604	182,165	437,769	11.0
Yellow	25,370	910	26,282	0.7
Mestizo	319,963	321,374	641,337	16.2
Republic of Cuba	2,102,620	1,859,724	3,962,344	100.0

== See also ==
- 2012 Cuba census
- Demographics of Cuba
- 1953 Cuba census
- Population and housing censuses by country
