= White Cubans =

Cubanos blancos (Spanish)
- Flag of Cuba, a symbol of Cuban national identity, not specific to any single ethnic or racial group

Total population
- White ancestry predominates ▼7,160,399 (2012 census) ▼64.12% of the Cuban population

Regions with significant populations
- All areas of Cuba

Languages
- Majority: Spanish; Minority: Galician · Catalan

Religion
- Majority: Christianity (Catholicism); Minority: Irreligion · Judaism · Protestantism

Related ethnic groups
- Europeans; West Asians; White Dominicans; White Puerto Ricans; White Argentines; White Mexicans; Others

White Cubans (Spanish: Cubanos blancos) are Cubans of wholly or predominantly European (predominantly Iberian) and West Asian ancestry, who self-identify as 'white'. At the institutional level, the Cuban National Office of Statistics and Information—the body responsible for compiling official demographic data—employs the designation "white" in its classifications.

The 2012 Cuban census identified White Cubans as the largest demographic group in Cuba, comprising 64.12% of the total population. In Cuba, the term blanco (English "white") encompasses persons of broadly European ancestry, in practice predominantly those of Southern European descent, whose phenotypic characteristics, include light skin complexion. Most white Cubans descend predominantly from Spanish settlers and immigrants, principally from the regions of Andalusia, the Canary Islands, Asturias, Galicia, and Castile.

Aside from those of Spanish descent, white Cuban ancestry also encompasses the descendants of immigrants from France, the United Kingdom (particularly England), Portugal, Italy, and other European nations. The Royal Decree of 21 October 1817 formally encouraged European settlement in Cuba during the island's administration as the Captaincy General, an administrative division of the Spanish Empire. Significant migratory flows from northern Spain, alongside immigrants from other parts of Europe, continued into the late nineteenth and early twentieth centuries.

== History ==
=== Settlement ===
The first Spanish settlers arrived with Columbus's first voyage in 1492, among them sailors and soldiers from Andalusia and the Canary Islands; the fleet had departed from the Andalusian port of Palos de la Frontera, stopping at Gran Canaria en route. In 1511, Diego Velázquez de Cuéllar set out with three ships and an army of 300 men from Hispaniola to form the first formal Spanish settlement in Cuba, with orders from Spain to conquer the island. The settlement was at Baracoa, but the new settlers were to be greeted with stiff resistance from the local Taíno population. In 1514, a settlement was founded in what was to become Havana. Velázquez de Cuéllar founded seven towns between 1511 and 1515, including Santiago de Cuba and San Cristóbal de La Habana.

Cuba's white population was varied with compared to elsewhere in the Caribbean including landless labourers, peasants, artisans, shopkeepers, construction workers, import and export merchants, butchers, salters, tailors, professionals in the army and navy, chemists, lawyers, doctors and priests.

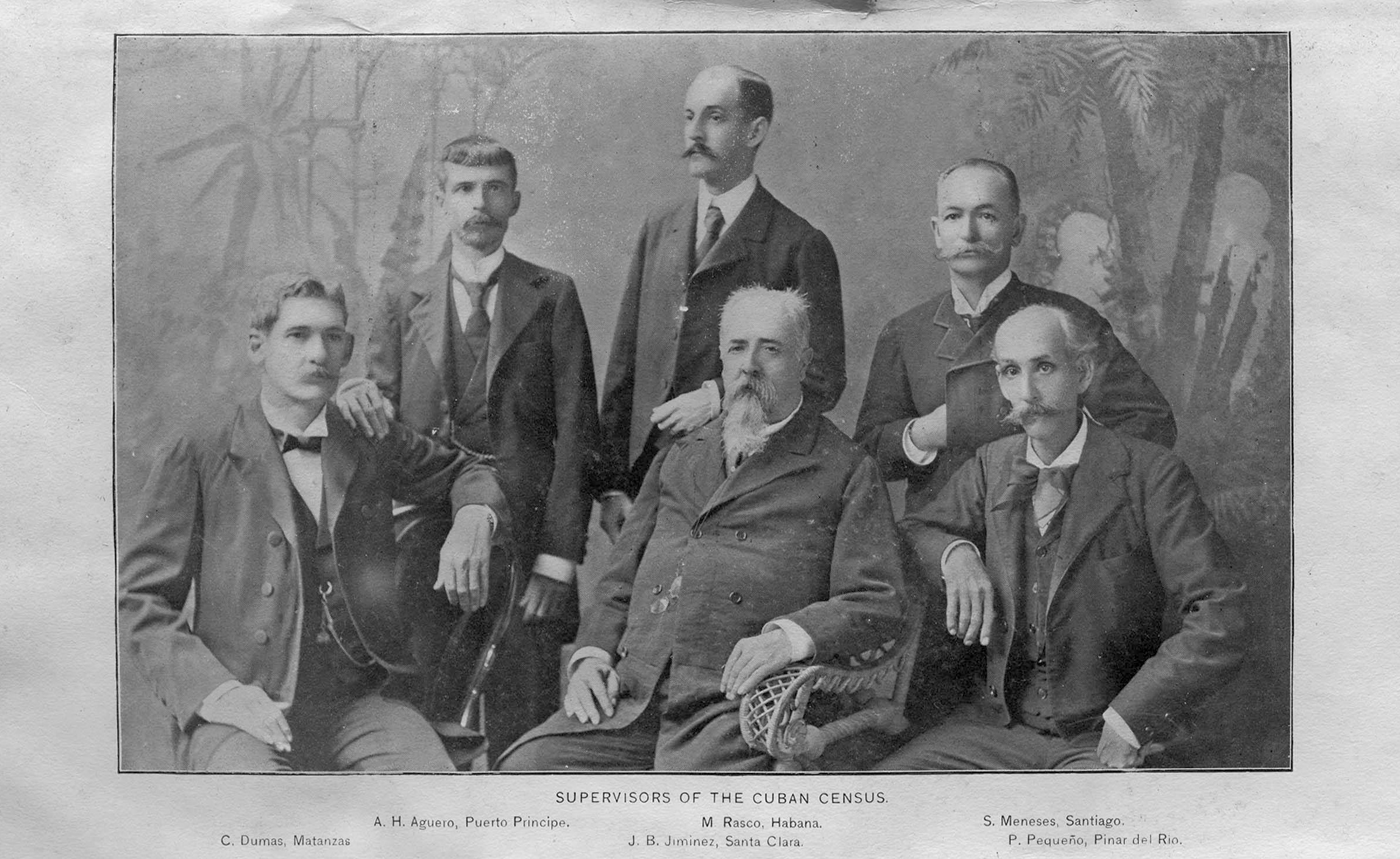
Cuban supervisors for the 1899 census.

During the eighteenth, nineteenth, and early part of the twentieth century, large waves of Canarians, Catalans, Andalusians, Castilians, and Galicians immigrated to Cuba.

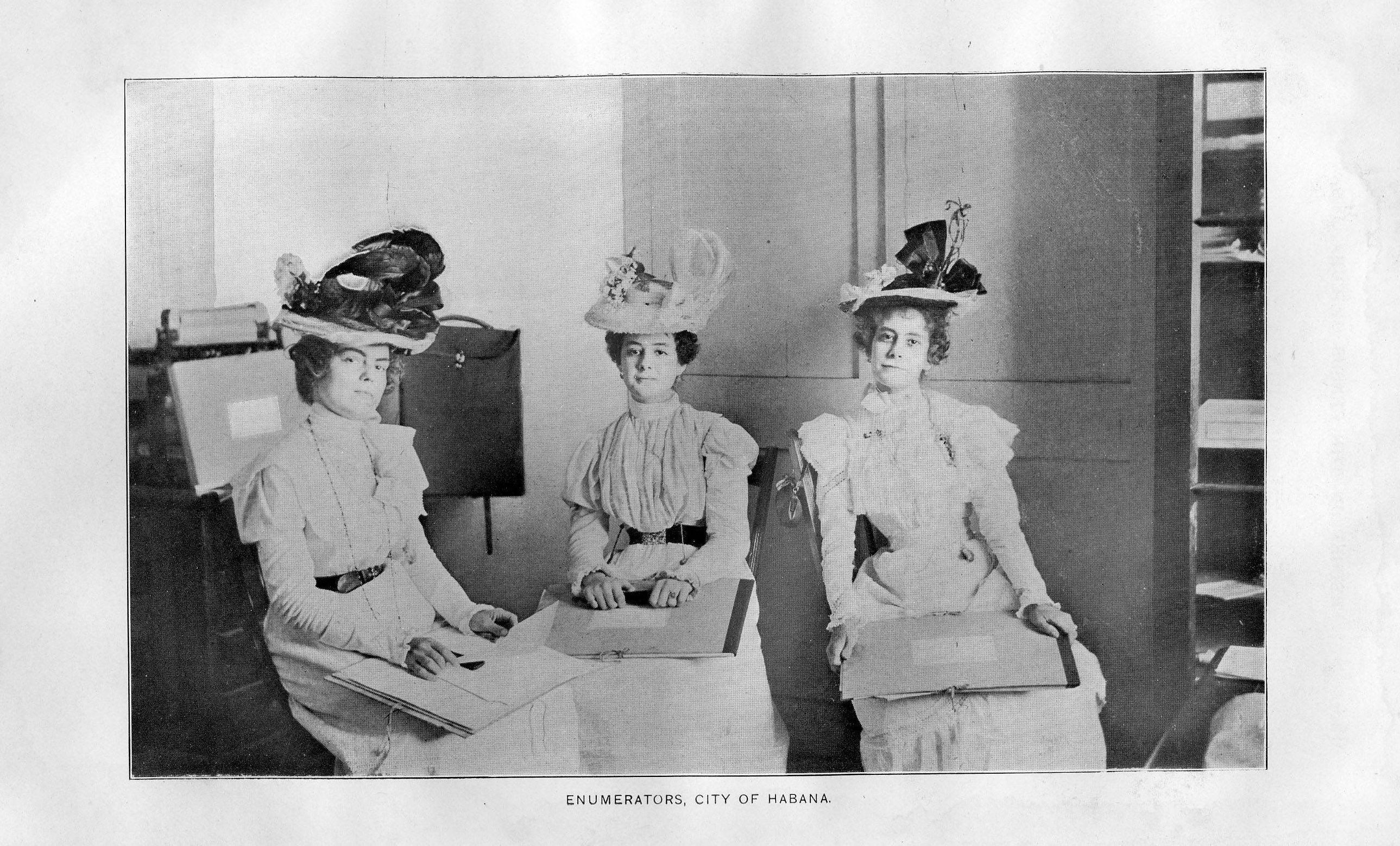
Enumerators for Havana in 1899.

Many European Jews have also immigrated there, with some of them being Sephardic. In 1899 those born in Spain represented 129,240 or 74.9% of the total foreign-born population.

=== 1900 - present ===
The first decades of the twentieth century immigration policies supported the migration of entire families. Between 1902 and 1907, nearly 128,000 Spaniards entered Cuba, and officially in 1906, Cuba created its immigration law that funded white migrants.

==== Spanish arrivals by region ====
The table shows the regions of Spanish arrivals to Cuba just in the year 1900. The three largest groups were Galicians, Asturians, and Canary Islanders which constituted 68% of all Spanish immigrants.

% of foreign-born in 1907.
1. Spain (81.0%)
2. China (4.90%)
3. United States (4.20%)
4. Africa (3.50%)
5. Rest of the Americas (3.00%)
6. England (0.50%)
7. Rest (2.90%)

Arrivals by region (1900)
| Region | Population | % |
|---|---|---|
| Galician | 19,088 | 28.56 |
| Asturian | 15,853 | 23.72 |
| Canary Islander | 10,509 | 15.72 |
| Old Castile | 5,126 | 7.6 |
| Catalan | 3,563 | 5.33 |
| Andalusian | 3,185 | 4.76 |
| León | 2,255 | 3.57 |
| Basque | 1,760 | 2.63 |
| New Castile | 1,225 | 1.83 |
| Valencian | 1,047 | 1.56 |
| Balearic | 869 | 1.32 |
| Aragonese | 780 | 1.16 |
| Navarrese | 754 | 1.12 |
| Murcia | 419 | 0.62 |
| Extremaduran | 384 | 0.50 |
| Total | 66,817 | 100 |

However, many European immigrants did not stay in Cuba and came solely for the sugar harvest, returning to their homes during the off seasons. Although some 780,000 Spaniards migrated between 1902–1931, 250,000 stayed. By the 1920s, increasing European migration through national policy had effectively failed. In 1907 the Spanish-born population represented 81% of the total foreign-born, increasing the share to 72.4% in 1919. In 1931, 274,303 were born in Europe, of these 257,596 were Spaniards composing 59% of all those born abroad and 6.5% of the total Cuban population. This gradually decreased by the mid 1950s. Spanish arrivals formed 63.9% of all foreign born in 1943 and half the population 74,561 (49.9%) in 1953.

The 1953 census reported that 72.8% of Cubans identified as white of European descent, mainly of Spanish origin, 12.4% were Black African, 14.5% of both Black and White ancestry (mulattos), and 0.3% of the population was of Chinese and or East Asian descent (officially called "amarilla" or "yellow" in the census).

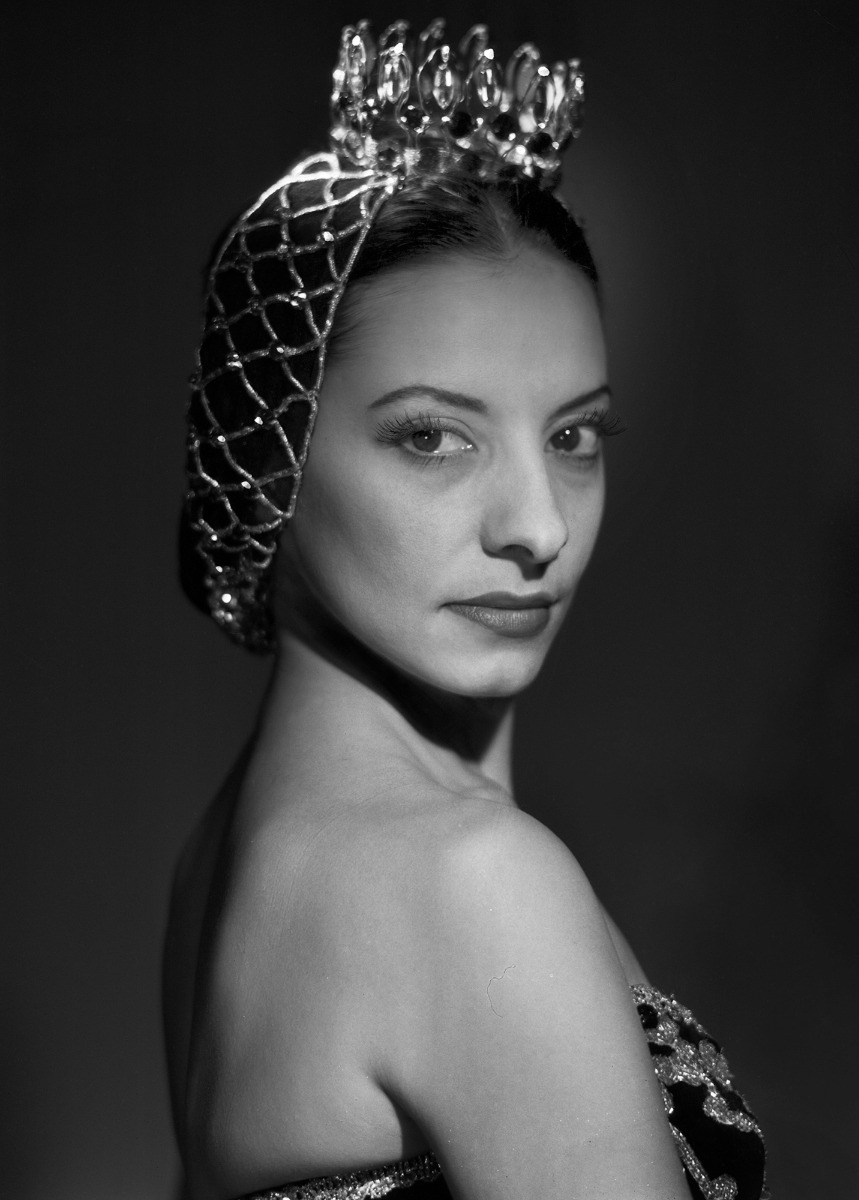
Alicia Alonso was a Cuban prima ballerina.

Population born in Spain
| Year | Population | % of pop. |
|---|---|---|
| 1899 | 129,240 | 8.21 |
| 1907 | 185,393 | ▲9.05 |
| 1919 | 245,644 | ▼8.5 |
| 1931 | 257,596 | ▼6.5 |
| 1943 | 157,527 | ▼3.3 |
| 1953 | 74,561 | ▼ |
| 1970 | 74,026 | ▼0.86 |
| 1981 | TBD | ▼0.04 |
| 2002 | TBD | ▼ |
| 2012 | TBD | ▼ |

Many of these and their descendants left after Castro's communist regime took power. Historically, between 1861-1887 Chinese descendants in Cuba were classified as White.

According to the National Statistics Institute data in January 2025, 1,185 Spanish born citizens were resident in Cuba. In 2025, there were 176,570 Cubans with Spanish nationality, largely claimed through Spanish ancestral origin. This represented 5.8% of the total worldwide 3,045,966 Spanish nationals outside Spain.

=== Other European groups ===
==== France ====
The first wave of French immigrants to arrive in Cuba were fleeing the Haitian Revolution and the new governmental administration of Haiti after independence was declared. This immigration reached its peak between 1800 and 1809, when more than twenty-seven thousand French of all social classes arrived in the eastern part of Cuba. Many of them emigrated to the city of Santiago de Cuba. A second wave occurred in 1814, with a third wave between 1818 and 1835 prompted by a royal order from the Spanish Crown intended to increase the proportion of white Europeans in Cuba and a fourth and last between 1836 and 1868.

==== Great Britain ====
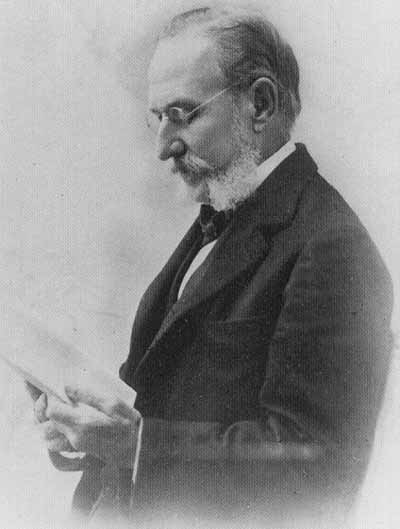
Epidemiologist Carlos Finlay.

The British (predominantly English and Irish) population in Cuba in the nineteenth and early twentieth century. The greatest number of British immigrants arriving between 1818 and 1819 in Havana and Matanzas were working class, due to promotion of European colonisation and settlement.

A considerable population of Irish and English immigrants settled in the North Eastern part of the island at the beginning of the 19th century, especially in the coastal cities and towns. In the 1840s the census showed that 1327 British nationals were in Cuba, this decade was the start of British immigration. This population increased to 16,005 in 1847 and 21, 244 in 1862. In 1899 there were 588 people born in England, 1,252 in 1907, rising to 19,628 in 1919, declining to 3,095 in 1931, 1,887 in 1943 and 14,421 in 1953.

== Demographics ==
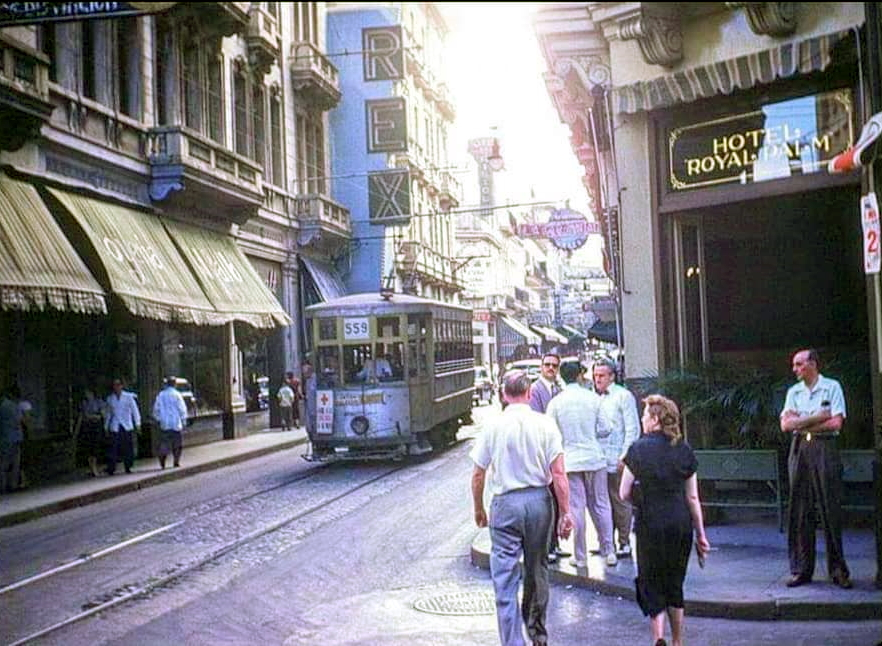
Entrance to the Royal Palm Hotel, Havana in 1930.

Most White Cubans are of Spanish, French, Portuguese, German, Italian, Irish, and Russian descent. White people in Cuba make up 64.1% of the total population according to the 2012 census, the majority predominantly of diverse Iberian-European mix. However, after the mass exodus resulting from the Cuban Revolution in 1959, the number of white Cubans actually residing in Cuba diminished. Today various records claiming the percentage of Whites in Cuba are conflicting and uncertain; some reports (usually coming from Cuba) still report a less, but similar number of 51% and others (usually from outside observers) report a 37-45%.

White Cubans 1774 - 2012
| N. | Year | Population | % pop. |
|---|---|---|---|
| 1 | 1774 | 96,440 | 56.19 |
| 2 | 1792 | 133,553 | ▼48.75 |
| 3 | 1817 | 238,910 | ▼43.20 |
| 4 | 1827 | 311,051 | ▲44.15 |
| 5 | 1841 | 418,291 | ▼41.51 |
| 6 | 1861 | 793,484 | ▲58.08 |
| 7 | 1877 | 981,039 | ▲65.00 |
| 8 | 1887 | 1,102,889 | ▲68.54 |
| 9 | 1899 | 1,052,397 | ▼66.91 |
| 10 | 1907 | 1,428,176 | ▲69.70 |
| 11 | 1919 | 2,088,047 | ▲72.28 |
| 12 | 1931 | 2,856,956 | ▼72.10 |
| 13 | 1943 | 3,553,312 | ▲74.36 |
| 14 | 1953 | 4,243,956 | ▼72.81 |
| 16 | 1981 | 6,415,468 | ▼65.98 |
| 17 | 2002 | 7,271,926 | ▼65.06 |
| 18 | 2012 | 7,160,399 | ▼64.12 |

=== Other studies ===
The Institute for Cuban and Cuban American Studies at the University of Miami says the present Cuban population is 38% White and 62% Black/Mulatto. The Minority Rights Group International says that "An objective assessment of the situation of Afro-Cubans remains problematic due to scant records and a paucity of systematic studies both pre- and post-revolution. Estimates of the percentage of people of African descent in the Cuban population vary enormously, ranging from 33.9 percent to 62 percent".

=== Population history ===
Officially Cuba has had 18 population censuses, eight during the colonial period (1774-1887), six during the republic (1899-1953) and four during the revolution period. From 1861 to 1887 Asians or Chinese were counted as white, due to the low population. Note that the 15th census in 1970 did not include data on race or ethnicity.

Table shows those who identify as white in every census since 1774 to the present. Source: ONEI Cuba

Demographic vertical bar chart of between 1774 and 2012
Population (1774-2012) Cuban census
Demographic vertical bar chart of between 1774 and 2012
Population percentage (%) per census (1774-2012)

== Geographic distribution ==
=== Historical figures ===
From 1879 to 1976 Cuba was divided into six provinces, which maintained with little changes the same boundaries and capital cities, although with modifications in official names. The following are the figures for the white Cuban population at the 1931 and 1953 census.

| Census | 1931 | | 1953 | |
| Province | Population / % | | Population / % | |
|---|---|---|---|---|
| Pinar del Rio | 270,547 | 78.8 | 357,252 | 79.7 |
| La Habana | 774,518 | 78.5 | 1,184,493 | 77.0 |
| Matanzas | 247,712 | 73.5 | 307,230 | 77.7 |
| Las Villas | 649,269 | 79.7 | 849,242 | 82.4 |
| Camagüey | 296,722 | 72.7 | 483,405 | 78.2 |
| Oriente | 618,188 | 57.6 | 1,062,334 | 59.1 |
| Cuba | 2,856,956 | 72.1 | 4,243,956 | 72.8 |

=== 2012 census ===
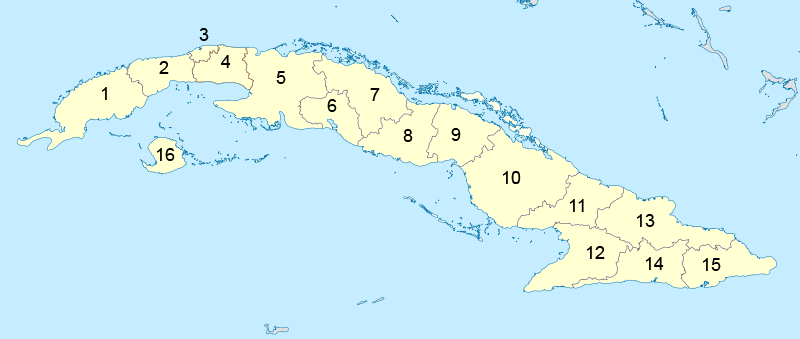
Provinces in order numbered 1-16 starting with Pinar del Rio.

Table shows the 2012 census figures for white Cubans in numbers and as a percentage of the total population and their distribution in each province.

| Province | Population | White (%) |
|---|---|---|
| Pinar del Rio | 457,879 | 78.0 |
| Artemisa | 378,439 | 76.5 |
| La Habana | 1,230,682 | 58.4 |
| Mayabeque | 294,414 | 78.1 |
| Matanzas | 513,217 | 73.9 |
| Cienfuegos | 306,404 | 75.8 |
| Villa Clara | 652,796 | 82.5 |
| Sancti Spiritus | 387,914 | 83.7 |
| Ciego de Avila | 335,674 | 78.8 |
| Camagüey | 580,472 | 75.2 |
| Las Tunas | 397,353 | 74.6 |
| Granma | 352,108 | 42.2 |
| Holguín | 828,059 | 80.0 |
| Santiago de Cuba | 268,375 | 25.6 |
| Guantanamo | 125,880 | 24.4 |
| Isla de la Juventud | 50,732 | 59.9 |
| Cuba | 7,160,399 | 64.1 |

=== Municipalities ===
The top 10 municipalities in 2012 with the highest proportion within the local population.

| Municipality | White (%) |
|---|---|
| Cabaiguán | 93.3 |
| Gibara | 92.1 |
| Florencia | 91.7 |
| Taguasco | 90.5 |
| Camajuaní | 89.7 |
| Báguanos | 89.3 |
| Calixto García | 89.2 |
| Puerto Padre | 88.8 |
| Rafael Freyre | 88.5 |
| Banes | 87.8 |

=== Age structure ===
| Age groups | White (%) |
| Total | 100 |
|---|---|
| 0-14 | 17.1 |
| 15-59 | 62.9 |
| 60 or more | 20.0 |

== Diaspora ==
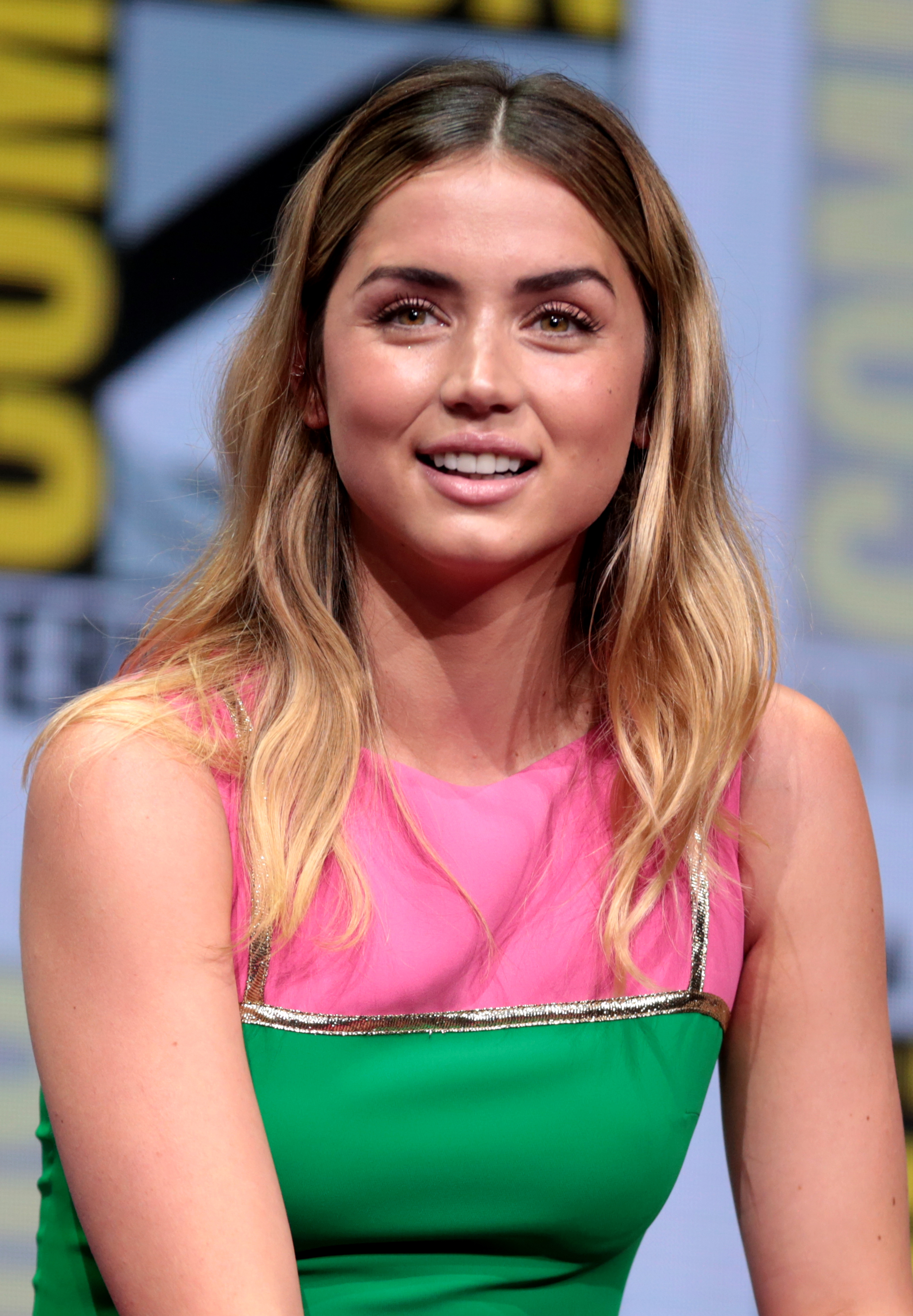
Actress Ana de Armas.

However, after the Cuban revolution, due to mainly mass exodus to Miami or Florida in general as the main destination, a drastic decrease in immigration to the island, Cuba's demography changed.

=== Characteristics ===
The first big Cuban immigration wave occurred from 1959-1962, this exodus was referred to as the "Golden exile" because of the mainly upper and middle class character of the emigrants. The flight of many skilled workers after the revolution caused a “brain drain.” This loss of trained professionals sparked a renovation of the Cuban education system to accommodate the education of new professionals to replace those that had emigrated. From 1959 to the end of open travel in 1962 around 250,000 Cubans left the island.

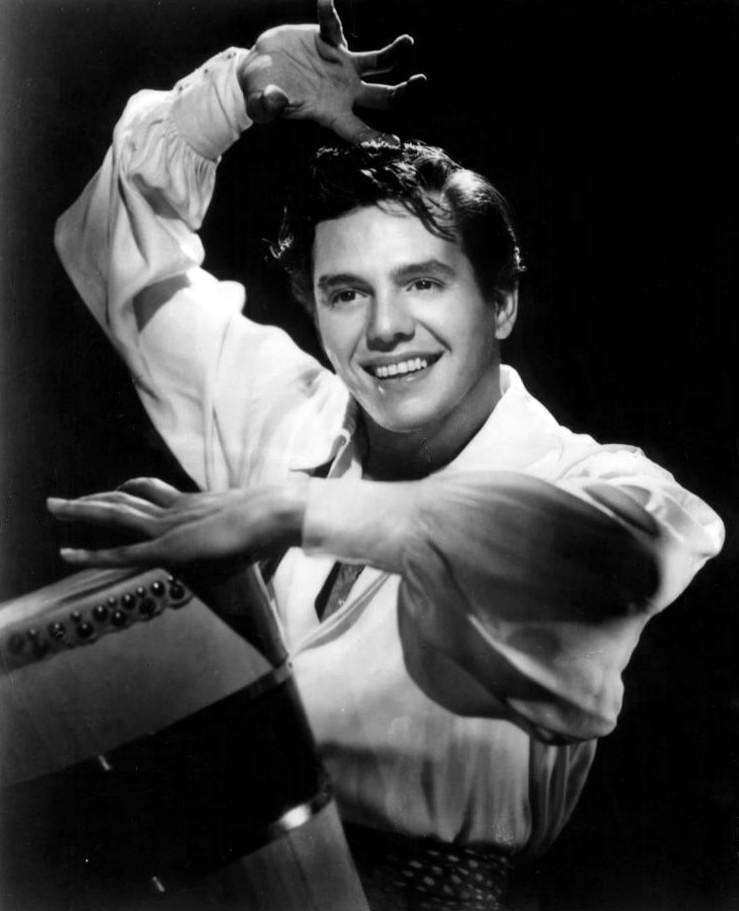
Actor Desi Arnaz in 1950.

During the 1960s, 97% of Cubans who arrived to the United States identified as white. During the 1970s, 80% of Cuban arrivals were white, 81% in the 1980s and 86% of those in the 1990s.

As a result, those who identify as white and those of pure Black African ancestry have decreased, the mixed population has increased, and the Chinese (or East Asian) population has, for all intents and purposes, disappeared.

Many notable people of European descent left Cuba at various intervals, for example actor Desi Arnaz (descended from Cuban nobility), actress Gina Romand, actor Andy Garcia, television host Daisy Fuentes and journalist and talk show host Cristina Saralegui.

== Genetics studies ==
An autosomal study from 2014 found the genetic makeup in Cuba to be 72% White, 20% Black African, and 8% Native American with different proportions depending on the self-reported ancestry (White, Mixed and Black). According to this study Whites are on average 86% White, 6.7% Black African and 7.8% Native American with European ancestry ranging from 65% to 99%. 75% of whites are over 80% European and 50% are over 88% European According to a study in 2011 Whites are on average 5.8% African with African ancestry ranging from 0% to 13%. 75% of whites are under 8% African and 50% are under 5% African. A study from 2009 analyzed the genetic structure of the three principal ethnic groups from Havana City (209 individuals), and the contribution of parental populations to its genetic pool.

A contribution from Indigenous peoples was not detectable in the studied sample.

== See also ==
- Cubans
- European Diaspora
- Culture of Cuba
- Colonial caste system

=== Immigrant communities in Cuba ===
- Spanish Cubans
- Arab Cubans
- Italian Cubans
- French Cubans
