= Cuba–France relations =

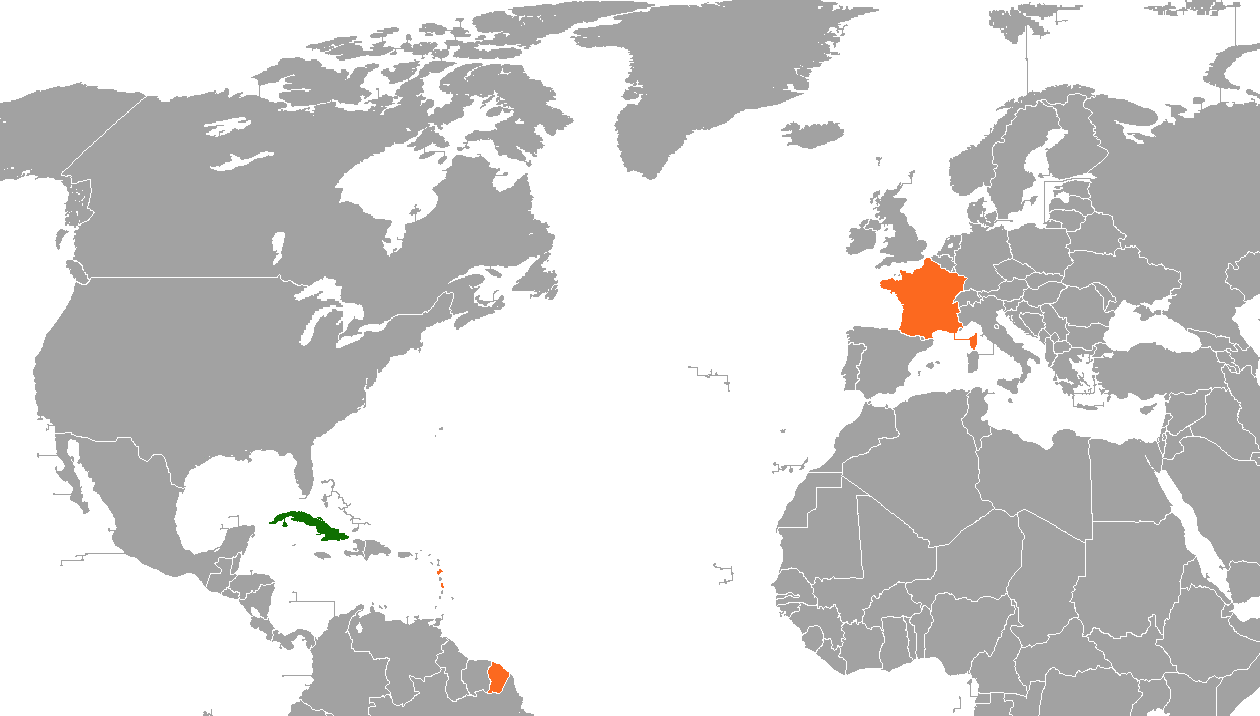

- Cuba: France

Cuba–France relations are the diplomatic relations between Cuba and France. Both nations are members of the United Nations.

== History ==
Soon after Cuba was colonized and incorporated into the Spanish Empire, there had been several contacts between Cuba and France. The first initial French contact with Cuba was in 1554 when French pirate Jacques de Sores (under the commission of King Francis I of France to raid Spanish ships and territories of gold) raided the Cuban city of Santiago de Cuba. In 1555, Sores also attacked and burned Havana. In 1791, during the initial stages of the Haitian Revolution, several thousand French and Haitian-born French citizens sought refugee in Cuba to escape the war. During 1800–1809, over 20,000 French, creoles and former slaves immigrated from Haiti to Cuba.

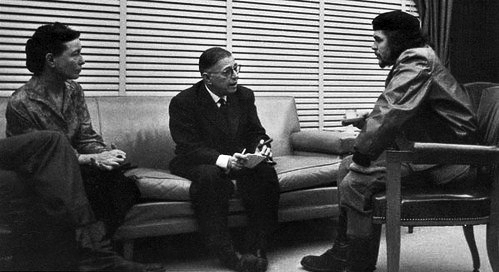
Simone de Beauvoir and Jean-Paul Sartre meeting with Ernesto Guevara in Cuba, 1960.

During the Spanish–American War (April - August 1898), France (along with the United Kingdom and Germany) urged Spain to end the war with the United States and to relinquish its territories of Cuba, the Philippines, Puerto Rico and Guam. The end of the war was finalized by the signing of the Treaty of Paris in December 1898. After the war, Cuba became a territory of the United States. In 1902, Cuba became an independent nation.

In January 1959, after the Cuban Revolution, Fidel Castro came to power on the island-nation. Initially, French intellectuals and writers were intrigued with the new change in Cuba. In 1960, French philosopher Jean-Paul Sartre and French writer Simone de Beauvoir paid a visit to Cuba and met with President Fidel Castro and Argentine-born Cuban revolutionary hero, Ernesto "Che" Guevara. In 1962, during the Cuban Missile Crisis, French President Charles de Gaulle supported the United States on the blockade of Cuba to prevent more missiles from landing on the island.

During a world tour in December 1964, Cuban diplomat Che Guevara paid an official visit to France. In October 1974, as First Secretary of the French Socialist Party, François Mitterrand (and future President of France), paid an official visit to Cuba for a week and was given a state visit in the country. In 1995, President Fidel Castro paid his first official visit to France and met with French President François Mitterrand. Fidel would return to France the following year to attend the funeral for Mitterrand.

In July 2015 during the Cuban thaw, France sought closer relations with Cuba. In May 2015, French President François Hollande became the first French head-of-state to visit Cuba. In February 2016, Cuban President Raúl Castro reciprocated the visit to France. In May 2018, French Foreign Minister Jean-Yves Le Drian paid a visit to Cuba.

== High-level visits ==
High-level visits from Cuba to France

- President Fidel Castro (1995, 1996)
- President Raúl Castro (2016)

High-level visits from France to Cuba

- President François Hollande (2015)
- Foreign Minister Jean-Yves Le Drian (2018)

== Bilateral agreements ==
Both nations have signed several bilateral agreements such as an Agreement on Science, Technology and the Environment (2015); Agreement on Tourism (2016); Agreement on Trade (2016); Agreement on Agricultural Cooperation (2016) and an Agreement on Joint Oil Exploration in the Gulf of Mexico (2016).

== Tourism and Transportation ==
In 2016, over 200,000 French citizens visited Cuba for tourism. There are direct flights between Cuba and France with the following airlines: Air Caraïbes, Air France, Corsair International and Cubana de Aviación.

== Trade ==
In 2016, trade between Cuba and France totaled €209 million Euros. Cuba's main exports to France include: fish, rum and cigars. France's main exports to Cuba include: cereals, chemical based products, automobile parts, dairy products, industrial and agricultural machinery and communication equipment. France is Cuba's eleventh largest trading partner globally. French multinational companies such as Pernod Ricard and Total S.A. operate in Cuba.

== Resident diplomatic missions ==
- Cuba has an embassy in Paris.
- France has an embassy in Havana.
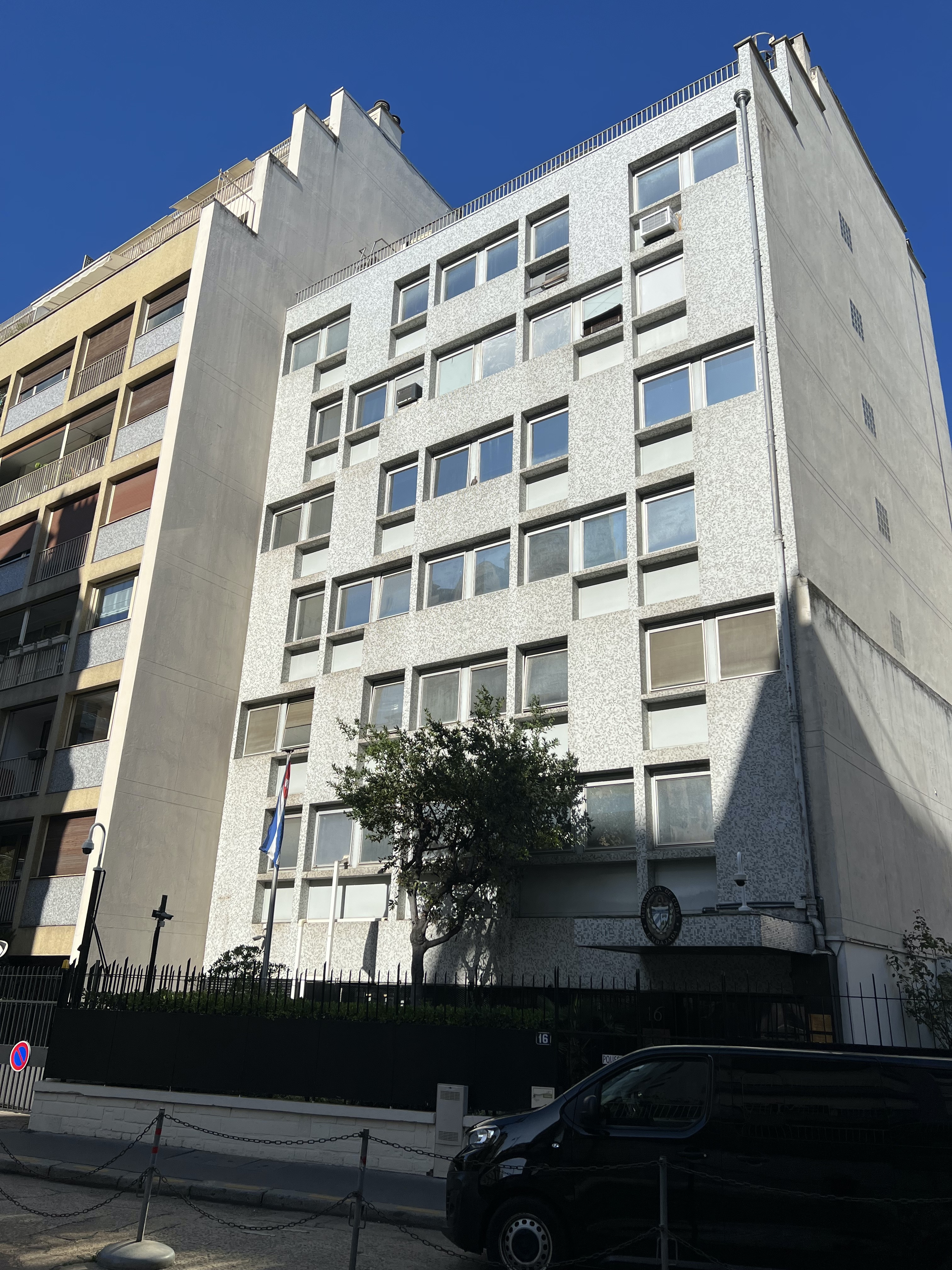
Embassy of Cuba in Paris

== See also ==
- Foreign relations of Cuba
- Foreign relations of France
- French immigration to Cuba
- Lycée Français de La Havane Alejo Carpentier
