= Lycée Français de La Havane Alejo Carpentier =

Coordinates: 23.0855°N 82.4637°W

- Escuela Francesa de La Habana "Alejo Carpentier"

Location
- Primary: Calle 15 N° 18004 entre 180 y 182 Siboney, La Habana, Cuba; Junior and senior HS: Calle 182 N°1513 entre 17 y 15 Siboney, La Habana, Cuba; Havana; Cuba

Information
- Type: K-12 school
- Established: 1972
- Grades: K-12
- Website: ecolehavane.org

Lycée Français de La Havane Alejo Carpentier, formerly École Française de la Havane "Alejo Carpentier" (Spanish: Escuela Francesa de La Habana "Alejo Carpentier"), is a French international school with two campuses in Siboney in Playa, Havana, Cuba: one for primary school and one for collège and lycée (junior and senior high school).

It was established in 1972. As of 2015 its students come from 29 countries and are a total of 200 people.

It directly teaches elementary through junior high school and uses the CNED programme for senior high school.

Campuses

== See also ==
- Cuba–France relations
