= French immigration to Cuba =

French immigration to Cuba began in Cuba in the eighteenth century and increased significantly in the nineteenth century. The majority of French people settled in eastern Cuba.

== History ==
=== First wave of migration ===
The first wave of French immigrants to arrive in Cuba were fleeing the Haitian Revolution and the new governmental administration of Haiti after independence was declared. This immigration reached its peak between 1800 and 1809, when more than twenty-seven thousand French of all social classes arrived in the eastern part of Cuba. Many of them emigrated to the city of Santiago de Cuba, which had neither sidewalks nor paved streets, and lacked drinking water, supplies and dwellings for the refugees.

The newcomers soon recognized the favorable conditions the new land presented. Initially, they worked in the port, and traded with the Catalans who had settled in Santiago. Consequently, the port of Santiago de Cuba saw much more commercial activity. With the resultant increase of the white population of the city, for the first time it had a relative balance between the black and the white populations. An apothecary and shops selling imported comestibles were opened, new government buildings were built, and postal service was expanded.

The Captaincy General of Cuba of the island approved the growing of coffee and many French-Haitian migrants were used for work in the coffee fields, especially those white French who were considered "solvent and reliable". By 1804 there were three thousand men cultivating the land, and agricultural lands were bought, sold and resold while Creole and French investors provided capital for new business ventures that became the economic engine of Santiago.

In 1807, coffee shipped to the United States and Spain was the principal Cuban export. Sebastián Kindelán y O’Regan, governor of Santiago, reported five hundred thousand coffee plants being cultivated on the island; the crop's yield of ten million pounds that year would be quadrupled in 1810. The beginning of the Peninsular War (1807–1814) between France and Spain caused the Captaincy General of the island to expel Franco-Haitian and French residents, and only those French who were naturalized Spanish citizens and had assimilated into the Spanish culture were allowed to remain. The exact number of French persons expelled from Santiago de Cuba is unknown, most of them moved to the southern United States, especially Louisiana.

=== Second, third and fourth waves of migration ===
In 1814, when peace between France and Spain was restored, the French immigrants who had left Cuba were allowed to return to the island. They, together with new French immigrants, formed a second wave of French immigration to Santiago de Cuba.

This second wave promoted an increase in economic activity in the city, and resulted in Santiago becoming a prime exporter of coffee. Sugarcane-raising expanded in the surrounding savannas, while new roads and aqueducts were built to encourage the settling of the Sierra Maestra.

Between 1818 and 1835 a third wave of immigration to Santiago de Cuba occurred, prompted by a royal order from the Spanish Crown intended to increase the proportion of whites in the Cuban population. While only a quarter of the population were engaged in agriculture, commercial activities were much more robust than before.

Since 1821, only a few years after a treaty was signed in 1817 between Spain and England to abolish the slave trade, this trade had nevertheless increased, and increased exports of sugar, honey, wax, coffee, tobacco and rum made the port of Santiago one of Cuba's busiest. With French investment in exploiting the mines in the area, mining had become a new and important sector in the city's economic development. With the general increase in mercantile activity, many new shops of all sorts were opened and tradesmen found a larger market for their products or labor.

The fourth and final wave of French immigrants to Santiago de Cuba occurred between 1836 and 1868. In this period, over 2200 French settlers emigrated, most of them coming from the Atlantic coast of France. The local economy was strengthened while the immigrants were absorbed into traditional occupations. In 1851, a French-owned steamship line was inaugurated to improve communications between Santiago de Cuba and New York City.

The civil engineer Jules Sagebien, a French immigrant from Picardy, after making a trip to Europe to learn engineering techniques for the building of railroads, did some technically challenging work for the Santiago de Cuba Railroad, which traverses rugged mountainous terrain. In July 1844, he surveyed the Santiago-Cobre line built to transport ore from the island's only copper mine to the port of Santiago, a railway project for the Eastern Department, the first of its kind in the region, according to historian Laura Cruz Ríos.

Coffee remained the number one crop in the Santiago de Cuba region, exceeding the sugar cane crop in value, until it reached its highest production in the 1840s. Towards the end of this decade, however, coffee production began to decline with the bankruptcy of some of the large landowners; investors then began to direct their capital into copper mining and sugar production. The French still had a presence in diverse sectors of the Cuban economy throughout the 19th century, especially in commercial trade, but also in agriculture, marine shipping, and the professions, including medicine, engineering, law, and pedagogy.

== Demography ==
The number of Cubans of French ancestry remains unknown. In some historical works, the number of French emigrants to Cuba is reported to be over 60,000 during the Haitian Revolution. In those days the total population of Cuba was less than 1,000,0000 and the proportion of whites to blacks was about 50% whites and 50% blacks. This meant that 10–12% of whites were French refugees. On 1 May 2012, the number of registered residents in the French Consulate record was 534, two thirds of them residing in Havana. They were primarily officials of the French Embassy, the Alliance Française and their families, and French expatriates working for French companies operating in Cuba and their families.

== Cuban people of French Descent ==
There hasn't been a specific study to resolve this question, but around 1-1.5 million Cubans have at least one French ancestor. This is considering the history of Cuba and the waves of colonial and republican-era migration. The most significant settlement regions are the provinces of Cienfuegos and Holguín.

== See also ==
- Cuba–France relations
- French diaspora
- Immigration to Cuba
