= 2012 Cuba census =

18th national census of Cuba

Eighteenth census of Cuba
- 15 September 2012; 13 years ago

General information
- Country: Cuba
- Topics: Census topics: Geography and migration; Personal characteristics and homes; Education; Economic; Movement of workers; Housing
- Authority: National Office of Statistics and Information (ONEI)
- Website: www.onei.gob.cu

Results
- Total population: 11,167,325 (▼ %)
- Most populous Province: La Habana (2,154,454)
- Least populous Province: Mayabeque (371,198)

The 2012 Cuba census was the eighteenth national population census of Cuba and was conducted by the National Office of Statistics and Information. The reference days used for the census, was the period from 15 and 24 September 2012. It is the 10th census for the Republic of Cuba. The total population of Cuba was counted as having 11,167,325 – a decrease of 10,418 people, 0.1% compared to the 2002 census.

Early census results were published and released to the public in January 2014. Cuba's next census is scheduled to take place in 2026.

== Census subjects ==
- Geography and migration
- Personal characteristics and homes
- Education
- Economic
- Movement
- Housing

== Population ==
=== Sex and age ===
Population by Sex and Age Group (2012)
Ages	Male	Female	Total	%
Total	5,570,825	5,596,500	11,167,325	100
0–4	321,422	303,770	625,192	5.60
5–9	305,672	288,427	594,099	5.32
10–14	362,252	341,019	703,271	6.30
15–19	363 p,986	340,140	704,126	6.31
20–24	426,956	399,702	826,658	7.40
25–29	388,961	366,768	755,729	6.77
30–34	318,339	305,141	623,480	5.58
35–39	421,389	417,242	838,631	7.51
40–44	504,738	510,284	1,015,022	9.09
45–49	511,501	529,712	1,041,213	9.32
50–54	378,808	395,691	774,499	6.94
55–59	302,073	321,940	624,013	5.59
60–64	274,261	290,374	564,635	5.06
65–69	230,423	250,494	480,917	4.31
70–74	182,623	198,274	380,897	3.41
75–79	123,987	140,936	264,923	2.37
80–84	82,067	97,603	179,670	1.61
85+	71,367	98,983	170,350	1.53
Ages	Male	Female	Total	%
0–14	989,346	933,216	1,922,562	17.22
15–64	3,891,012	3,876,994	7,768,006	69.56
65+	690,467	786,290	1,476,757	13.22

=== Density by province ===
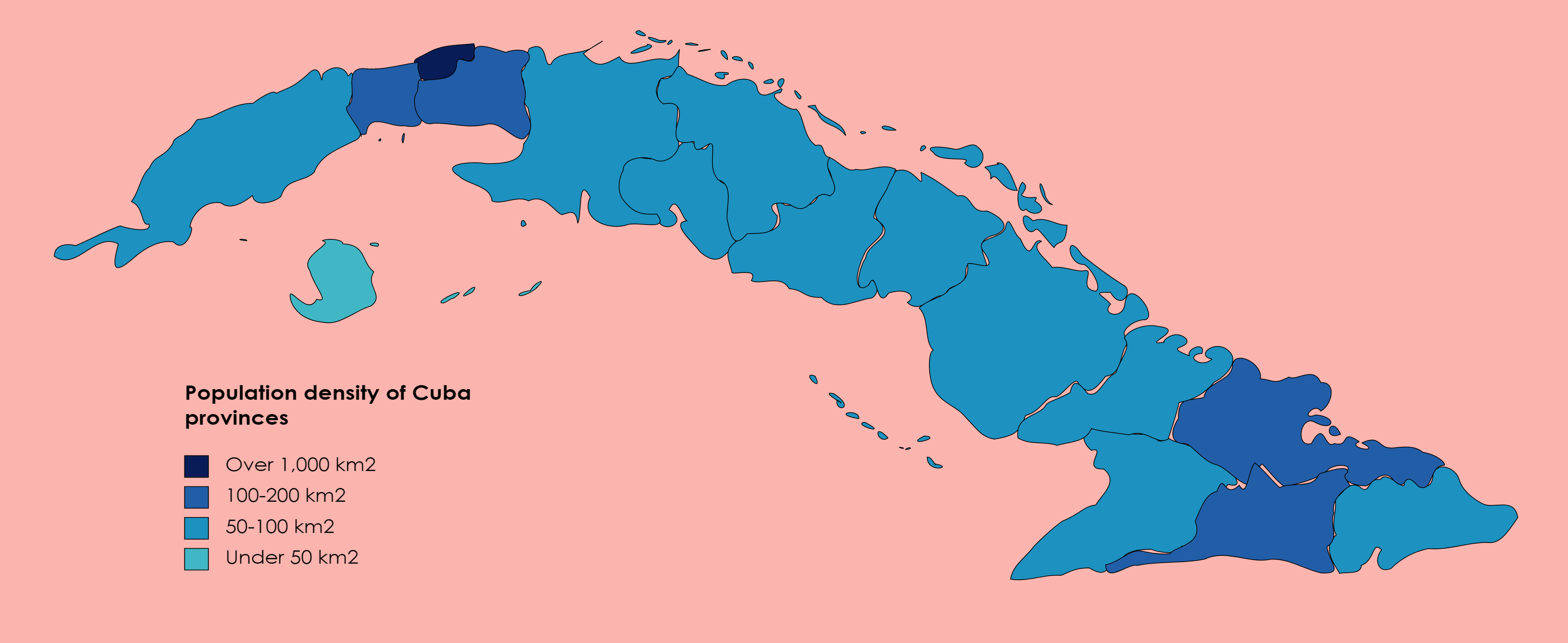
Map showing population density of Cuba in 2012.

=== City rank ===
Largest cities or towns in Cuba 2012 census
Rank	Name	Province	Pop.
1	Havana	La Habana	2,106,146
2	Santiago de Cuba	Santiago de Cuba	431,272
3	Camagüey	Camagüey	300,958
4	Holguín	Holguín	287,881
5	Guantánamo	Guantánamo	217,135
6	Santa Clara	Villa Clara	211,925
7	Las Tunas	Las Tunas	162,957
8	Bayamo	Granma	157,027
9	Cienfuegos	Cienfuegos	147,110
10	Pinar del Río	Pinar del Río	140,230

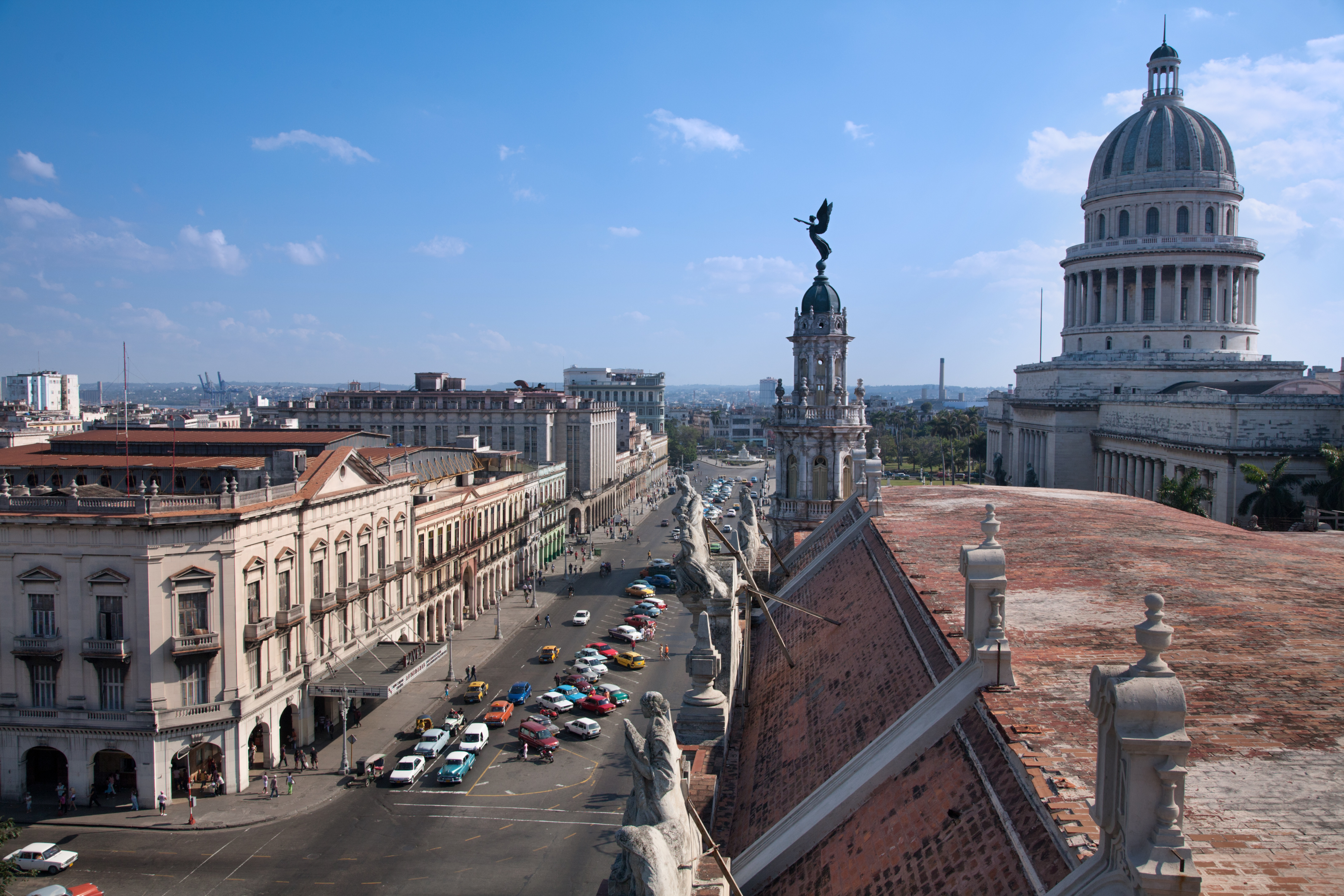
Havana is the most populated city.

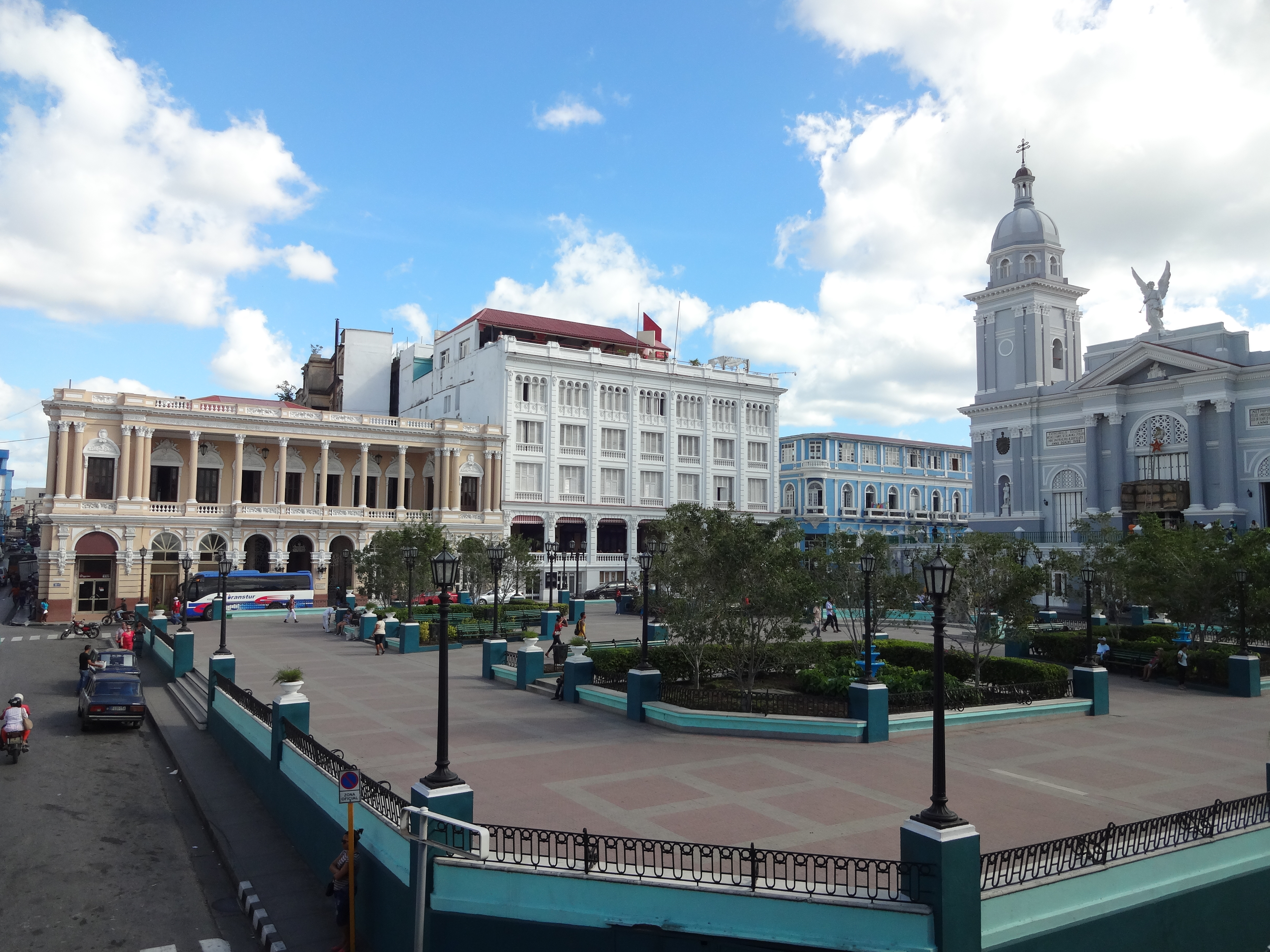
Santiago de Cuba, the second most populated city.

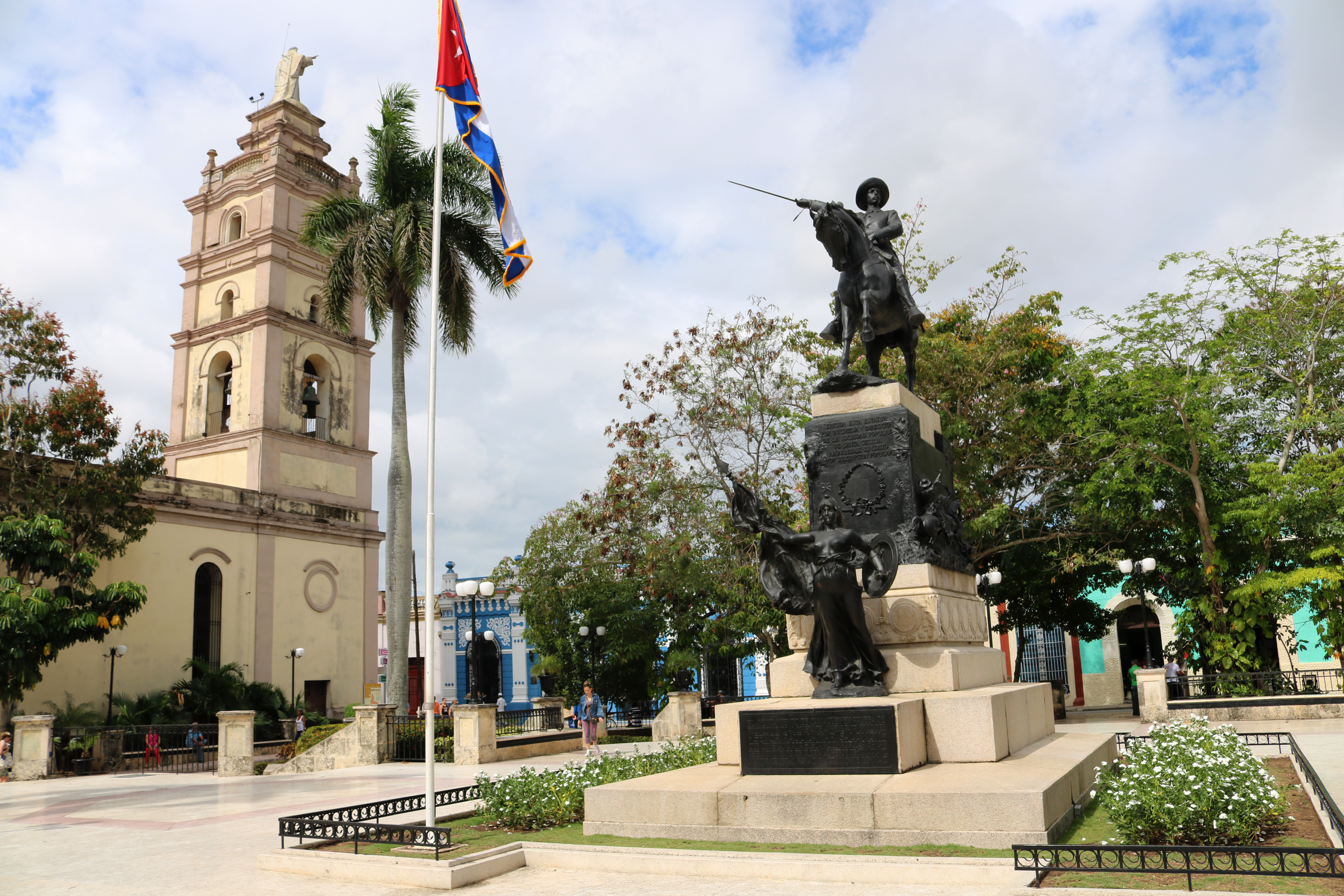
Camagüey, the 3rd largest city.

== Race or color ==
=== Provinces ===
The table shows the proportion of ethnic or racial groups by province.

Province	White (%)	Black (%)	Mestizo / Mulatto (%)
Cuba	64.1	9.3	26.6
Pinar del Río	78.0	10.8	11.2
Artemisa	76.5	9.3	14.2
La Habana	58.4	15.2	26.4
Mayabeque	78.1	7.9	14.0
Matanzas	73.9	10.2	15.9
Cienfuegos	75.8	7.5	16.7
Villa Clara	82.5	5.3	12.2
Sancti Spíritus	83.7	5.4	10.9
Ciego de Ávila	78.8	6.7	14.5
Camagüey	75.2	8.0	16.8
Las Tunas	74.6	4.4	21.0
Granma	42.2	3.5	54.3
Holguín	80.0	3.9	16.1
Santiago de Cuba	25.6	14.2	60.2
Guantánamo	24.4	12.8	62.8
Isla de la Juventud	59.9	9.4	30.7

=== Age ===
This shows the ethnic groups by ages.

Ages	Total 100%	White 64.12% (% in race/in age group)	Black 9.26% (% in race/in age group)	Mulatto/Mestizo 26.62% (% in race/in age group)
Population	11,167,325	7,160,399	1,034,044	2,972,882
0	131 419 (1,18%)	91 432 (1,28%/69,57%)	5 368 (0,52%/4,08%)	34 619 (1,16%/26,34%)
0-4	625 192 (5,60%)	412 604 (5,76%/66,00%)	31 828 (3,08%/5,09%)	180 760 (6,08%/28,91%)
5-9	594 099 (5,32%)	372 304 (5,20%/62,67%)	38 481 (3,72%/6,48%)	183 314 (6,17%/30,86%)
10-14	703 271 (6,30%)	439 406 (6,14%/62,48%)	52 121 (5,04%/7,41%)	211 744 (7,12%/30,11%)
15-19	704 126 (6,31%)	434 944 (6,07%/61,77%)	57 638 (5,57%/8,19%)	211 544 (7,12%/30,04%)
20-24	826 658 (7,40%)	511 488 (7,14%/61,87%)	71 570 (6,92%/8,66%)	243 600 (8,19%/29,47%)
25-29	755 729 (6,77%)	463 004 (6,47%/61,27%)	69 282 (6,70%/9,17%)	223 443 (7,52%/29,57%)
30-34	623 480 (5,58%)	380 742 (5,32%/61,07%)	61 368 (5,93%/9,84%)	181 370 (6,10%/29,09%)
35-39	838 631 (7,51%)	520 668 (7,27%/62,09%)	82 640 (7,99%/9,85%)	235 323 (7,92%/28,06%)
40-44	1 015 022 (9,09%)	635 473 (8,87%/62,61%)	103 827 (10,04%/10,23%)	275 722 (9,27%/27,16%)
45-49	1 041 213 (9,32%)	662 297 (9,25%/63,61%)	111 934 (10,82%/10,75%)	266 982 (8,98%/25,64%)
50-54	774 499 (6,94%)	492 046 (6,87%/63,53%)	85 145 (8,23%/10,99%)	197 308 (6,64%/25,48%)
55-59	624 013 (5,59%)	401 361 (5,61%/64,32%)	68 511 (6,63%/10,98%)	154 141 (5,18%/24,70%)
60-64	564 635 (5,06%)	383 286 (5,35%/67,88%)	58 247 (5,63%/10,32%)	123 102 (4,14%/21,80%)
65-69	480 917 (4,31%)	335 144 (4,68%/69,69%)	46 826 (4,53%/9,74%)	98 947 (3,33%/20,57%)
70-74	380 897 (3,41%)	269 331 (3,76%/70,71%)	36 701 (3,55%/9,64%)	74 865 (2,52%/19,65%)
75-79	264 923 (2,37%)	188 653 (2,63%/71,21%)	25 867 (2,50%/9,76%)	50 403 (1,70%/19,03%)
80-84	179 670 (1,61%)	131 158 (1,83%/73,00%)	17 011 (1,65%/9,47%)	31 501 (1,06%/17,53%)
85+	170 350 (1,53%)	126 490 (1,77%/74,25%)	15 047 (1,46%/8,83%)	28 813 (0,97%/16,91%)

== See also ==
- 1953 Cuba census
