= 1953 Cuba census =

Fourteenth Census of Cuba
- 28 January 1953; 72 years ago

General information
- Country: Republic of Cuba
- Authority: National Office of Statistics and Information
- Website: www.onei.gob.cu

Results
- Total population: 5,829,029 (▲2.01%)
- Most populous province: Oriente (1,797,606)
- Least populous province: Matanzas (395,780)

The 1953 Cuba census was the fourteenth national population census held in the Republic of Cuba. The day used for the census, was 28 January 1953. The census revealed a total population of 5,829,029, - an overall increase of 1,050,446 (2.01% per year) over the 1943 census figure.

== Population ==
Population counts for Cuban provinces:

Provinces	Males	Females	Population	%
Pinar del Río	232,238	216,184	448,422	7.7
Havana	758,683	780,120	1,538,803	26.4
Matanzas	204,852	190,928	395,780	6.8
Las Villas	530,945	499,217	1,030,162	17.7
Camagüey	333,639	234,617	618,256	10.6
Oriente	924,793	872,813	1,797,606	30.8
Cuba	2,985,155	2,843,874	5,829,029	100.0

=== Birthplace ===
The number of people living in Cuba who were foreign-born continued to decrease in absolute numbers and percentage from the previous census. In 1953, 230,431 people (3.95 percent) were born outside of Cuba.

Country	Population	Percent (%)
Cuba	5,598,598	96.05
Total, Foreign-born	230,431	3.95
Europe		
Spain	74,561	1.28
England	14,421	-
Poland	-	-
France	886	-
Italy	1,036	-
Germany	309	-
Other European	3,338	-
Africa	117	-
America	38,642	-
United States	6,503	-
Other America	32,139	-
Asia	-	-
China	11,834	-
Other Asia	3,571	-
Not-identified	612	-
Republic of Cuba	5,829,029	100.0
Source: Censo de 1953

=== Race ===
Race	Males	Females	Population	%
White	2,172,933	2,071,023	4,243,956	72.8
Black	379,107	346,204	725,311	12.4
Yellow	15,106	1,551	16,657	0.3
Mestizo	418,009	415,096	843,105	14.5
Republic of Cuba	2,985,153	2,843,874	5,829,029	100.0
Source: Censo de 1953

== See also ==
- Demographics of Cuba
- 1931 Cuba census
- 2012 Cuba census
