= Demographics of Cuba =

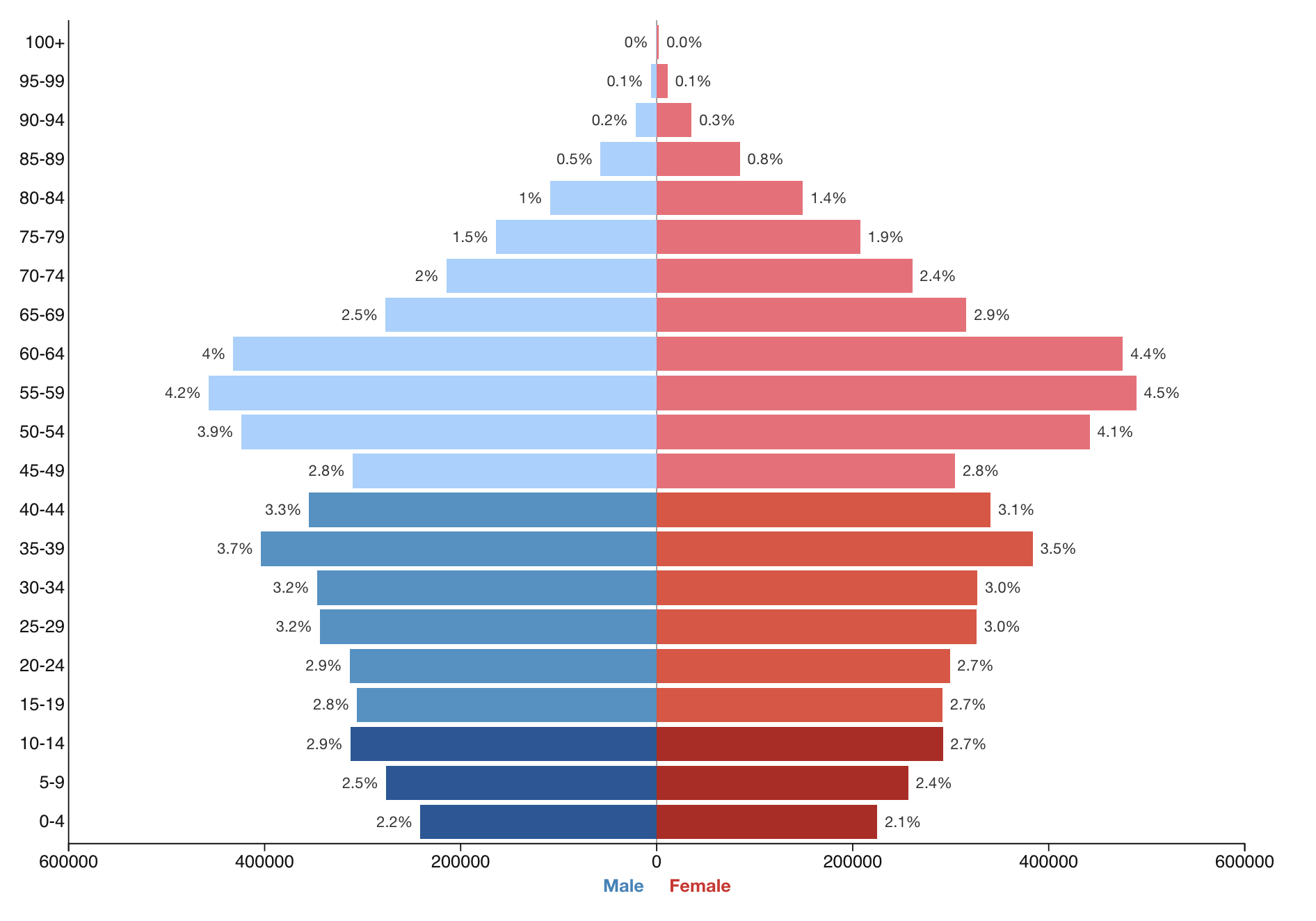
- Cuba population pyramid (2026)
- Population: 10,892,672 (2026 est.)
- Growth rate: -0.4% (2026 est.)
- Birth rate: 7.1 births/1,000 population (2025 est.)
- Death rate: 14.0 deaths/1,000 population (2025 est.)
- Life expectancy: 80.1 years
  - male: 77.8 years
  - female: 82.6 years (2024 est.)
- Fertility rate: 1.29 children born/woman (2025 est.)
- Infant mortality: 7.1 deaths/1,000 live births (2024 est.)
- Net migration rate: -2.1 migrant(s)/1,000 population (2024 est.)

Age structure
- 0–14 years: ▼15.0% (2025 est.)
- 15–64 years: ▼67.9% (2025 est.)
- 65 and over: ▲17.0% (2025 est.)

Sex ratio
- Total: 0.99 male(s)/female (2024 est.)
- At birth: 1.06 male(s)/female
- Under 15: 1.06 male(s)/female
- 65 and over: 0.82 male(s)/female

Nationality
- Nationality: Cuban
- Major ethnic: White (64.12%); Spanish (N/D); Others (N/D)
- Minor ethnic: Mixed (26.62%); Black (9.26%)

Language
- Official: Spanish
- Spoken: Lucumí

The demographic characteristics of Cuba are known through census which have been conducted and analyzed by different bureaus since 1774. The National Office of Statistics of and Information of Cuba (ONEI) is doing it since 1953. The most recent census was conducted in September 2012. The population of Cuba at the 2012 census was nearly 11.2 million. It declined to 9,748,007 people in 2024 and 9,434,593 in 2025.

Although not a census, in July 2024, Juan Carlos Alfonso Fraga, deputy head of the ONEI, presented data on Cuba's effective population to the deputies. According to ONEI data, as of 31 December 2023, the effective Cuban population was 10,055,968 people.

According to the 2012 census, the population density at that time was 101 inhabitants per square kilometer, and the overall life expectancy in Cuba was 78 years. The population has always increased from one census to the next in the 20th century, with the exception of the 2012 census, when the count decreased by 10,000. The 2024 data by ONEI seems to corroborate that trend.

In 2020 Cuba's birth rate has surpassed its death rate. Cuba is currently in the fourth stage of demographic transition. In terms of age structure, the population is dominated (71.1%) by the 15- to 64-year-old segment. The median age of the population is 39.5, making it the oldest in the Americas, and the gender ratio of the total population is 0.99 males per female.

== Population size and structure ==
Historical population
| Year | Pop. | ±% p.a. |
|---|---|---|
| 1943 | 4,778,583 | — |
| 1953 | 5,829,029 | +2.01% |
| 1970 | 8,569,121 | +2.29% |
| 1981 | 9,723,605 | +1.16% |
| 2002 | 11,177,743 | +0.67% |
| 2012 | 11,167,325 | −0.01% |

According to the 2002 census, Cuba's population was 11,177,743, whereas the 2012 census numbered the population at 11,167,325. There was a drop between the 2002 and 2012 censuses which was the first drop in Cuba's population since Cuba's war of independence. This drop was due to low fertility and emigration, as during this time (fiscal years 2003 to 2012), 42,028 Cubans received legal permanent residence in the United States. Consequently, Cuba is also the oldest country in the Americas in terms of median age, due to a high amount of emigration by younger Cubans to the U.S. In the last few years before the end of the wet feet, dry feet policy on 12 January 2017, the number of Cubans moving to the United States significantly outnumbered the natural increase during those years.

Cuban policy responses to its aging population include increases in paid maternity benefits, improving access to daycares, and establishing the Service Network for Non-fertile Couples to provide treatment for infertility.

As of 2025, Cuba has the oldest population in Latin America.

=== Population by subdivisions ===
Population and Area by region
| Province | Area (km²) | Area (%) | Population | Population (%) | Density |
|---|---|---|---|---|---|
| Cuba total | 108,889.02 | 100 | 11,117,873 | 100 | 101.72 |
| Pinar del Río | 10,904.5 | 9.92 | 1,078,898 | 6.50 | 66.63 |
| Havana | 8,475.57 | 5.22 | 2,163,824 | 6.36 | 124.06 |
| Santiago de Cuba | 1,023.8 | 0.66 | 1,337,339 | 19.70 | 77.6 |
| Holguin | 9,293.6 | 9.44 | 1,021,591 | 6.00 | 56.80 |

=== Structure of the population ===
Population by Sex and Age Group (Census 2012)

| Age group | Male | Female | Total | % |
|---|---|---|---|---|
| Total | 5 570 825 | 5 596 500 | 11 167 325 | 100 |
| 0-4 | 321 422 | 303 770 | 625 192 | 5.60 |
| 5-9 | 305 672 | 288 427 | 594 099 | 5.32 |
| 10-14 | 362 252 | 341 019 | 703 271 | 6.30 |
| 15-19 | 363 986 | 340 140 | 704 126 | 6.31 |
| 20-24 | 426 956 | 399 702 | 826 658 | 7.40 |
| 25-29 | 388 961 | 366 768 | 755 729 | 6.77 |
| 30-34 | 318 339 | 305 141 | 623 480 | 5.58 |
| 35-39 | 421 389 | 417 242 | 838 631 | 7.51 |
| 40-44 | 504 738 | 510 284 | 1 015 022 | 9.09 |
| 45-49 | 511 501 | 529 712 | 1 041 213 | 9.32 |
| 50-54 | 378 808 | 395 691 | 774 499 | 6.94 |
| 55-59 | 302 073 | 321 940 | 624 013 | 5.59 |
| 60-64 | 274 261 | 290 374 | 564 635 | 5.06 |
| 65-69 | 230 423 | 250 494 | 480 917 | 4.31 |
| 70-74 | 182 623 | 198 274 | 380 897 | 3.41 |
| 75-79 | 123 987 | 140 936 | 264 923 | 2.37 |
| 80-84 | 82 067 | 97 603 | 179 670 | 1.61 |
| 85+ | 71 367 | 98 983 | 170 350 | 1.53 |
| Age group | Male | Female | Total | Percent |
| 0-14 | 989 346 | 933 216 | 1 922 562 | 17.22 |
| 15-64 | 3 891 012 | 3 876 994 | 7 768 006 | 69.56 |
| 65+ | 690 467 | 786 290 | 1 476 757 | 13.22 |

Population Estimates by Sex and Age Group (01.VII.2013):

| Age group | Male | Female | Total | % |
|---|---|---|---|---|
| Total | 5 580 810 | 5 610 798 | 11 191 608 | 100 |
| 0-4 | 321 478 | 303 526 | 625 004 | 5.58 |
| 5-9 | 301 959 | 284 488 | 586 447 | 5.24 |
| 10-14 | 359 531 | 338 675 | 698 206 | 6.24 |
| 15-19 | 363 489 | 340 163 | 703 652 | 6.29 |
| 20-24 | 422 593 | 395 300 | 817 893 | 7.31 |
| 25-29 | 395 116 | 372 190 | 767 305 | 6.86 |
| 30-34 | 323 405 | 309 400 | 632 805 | 5.65 |
| 35-39 | 404 654 | 400 360 | 805 014 | 7.19 |
| 40-44 | 504 560 | 508 992 | 1 013 551 | 9.06 |
| 45-49 | 510 718 | 528 487 | 1 039 204 | 9.29 |
| 50-54 | 397 073 | 414 802 | 811 875 | 7.25 |
| 55-59 | 300 439 | 320 991 | 621 430 | 5.55 |
| 60-64 | 278 891 | 296 070 | 574 961 | 5.14 |
| 65-69 | 233 904 | 255 751 | 489 654 | 4.38 |
| 70-74 | 185 892 | 202 686 | 388 578 | 3.47 |
| 75-79 | 125 408 | 143 251 | 268 659 | 2.40 |
| 80-84 | 81 997 | 98 823 | 180 819 | 1.62 |
| 85+ | 69 707 | 96 849 | 166 556 | 1.49 |
| Age group | Male | Female | Total | Percent |
| 0-14 | 982 968 | 926 689 | 1 909 657 | 17.06 |
| 15-64 | 3 900 934 | 3 886 749 | 7 787 683 | 69.59 |
| 65+ | 696 908 | 797 360 | 1 494 268 | 13.35 |

Population Estimates by Sex and Age Group (01.VII.2021) (Provisional):

| Age group | Male | Female | Total | % |
|---|---|---|---|---|
| Total | 5 533 579 | 5 613 825 | 11 147 405 | 100 |
| 0–4 | 284 758 | 265 909 | 550 667 | 4.94 |
| 5–9 | 317 987 | 297 439 | 615 427 | 5.52 |
| 10–14 | 302 634 | 285 574 | 588 208 | 5.28 |
| 15–19 | 321 819 | 304 354 | 626 173 | 5.62 |
| 20–24 | 358 731 | 338 129 | 696 860 | 6.25 |
| 25–29 | 366 550 | 343 788 | 710 338 | 6.37 |
| 30–34 | 408 870 | 386 649 | 795 519 | 7.14 |
| 35–39 | 353 346 | 340 870 | 694 216 | 6.23 |
| 40–44 | 322 242 | 316 024 | 638 266 | 5.73 |
| 45–49 | 450 573 | 454 723 | 905 296 | 8.12 |
| 50–54 | 480 598 | 498 770 | 979 368 | 8.79 |
| 55–59 | 462 561 | 492 306 | 954 867 | 8.57 |
| 60–64 | 304 748 | 333 958 | 638 706 | 5.73 |
| 65-69 | 256 611 | 287 734 | 544 345 | 4.88 |
| 70-74 | 210 979 | 243 047 | 454 026 | 4.07 |
| 75-79 | 153 365 | 186 785 | 340 151 | 3.05 |
| 80-84 | 97 694 | 124 981 | 222 675 | 2.00 |
| 85-89 | 48 696 | 66 613 | 115 309 | 1.03 |
| 90-94 | 20 235 | 30 807 | 51 042 | 0.46 |
| 95-99 | 7 092 | 10 628 | 17 721 | 0.16 |
| 100+ | 3 487 | 4 731 | 8 218 | 0.07 |
| Age group | Male | Female | Total | Percent |
| 0–14 | 905 379 | 848 922 | 1 754 301 | 15.74 |
| 15–64 | 3 830 041 | 3 809 577 | 7 639 618 | 68.53 |
| 65+ | 798 159 | 955 326 | 1 753 485 | 15.73 |

View source data.
View source data.
View source data.
View source data.

== Vital statistics ==
=== Registered births and deaths ===
| | Average population | Live births | Deaths | Natural change | Crude birth rate (per 1000) | Crude death rate (per 1000) | Natural change (per 1000) | Crude migration change (per 1000) | Total fertility rate | Infant mortality rate |
|---|---|---|---|---|---|---|---|---|---|---|
| 1948 | | 157,364 | 40,190 | 117,174 | | | | | — | — |
| 1949 | | 160,628 | 40,538 | 120,090 | | | | | — | — |
| 1950 | 5,920,000 | 163,122 | 39,190 | 123,932 | 27.9 | 6.7 | 21.2 | | — | — |
| 1951 | 6,051,000 | 142,693 | 40,939 | 101,754 | 23.9 | 6.9 | 17.0 | 4.9 | — | — |
| 1952 | 6,180,000 | 143,750 | 37,221 | 106,529 | 23.6 | 6.1 | 17.5 | 3.7 | — | — |
| 1953 | 6,305,000 | 150,000 | 37,161 | 112,839 | 24.2 | 6.0 | 18.2 | 2.0 | — | — |
| 1954 | 6,424,000 | 160,000 | 35,712 | 124,288 | 25.4 | 5.7 | 19.7 | -0.8 | — | — |
| 1955 | 6,539,000 | 170,000 | 37,264 | 132,736 | 26.5 | 5.8 | 20.7 | -2.8 | — | — |
| 1956 | 6,652,000 | 170,607 | 42,811 | 127,796 | 27.6 | 5.6 | 22.0 | -2.3 | — | — |
| 1957 | 6,765,000 | 170,946 | 46,857 | 124,089 | 28.4 | 6.1 | 22.3 | -1.7 | — | — |
| 1958 | 6,881,000 | 176,510 | 49,093 | 127,417 | 29.7 | 6.3 | 23.4 | -1.7 | — | — |
| 1959 | 7,005,000 | 191,207 | 50,865 | 140,342 | 29.8 | 6.4 | 23.4 | -2.4 | — | — |
| 1960 | 7,141,000 | 211,620 | 42,670 | 168,950 | 30.8 | 6.2 | 24.6 | -4.7 | — | — |
| 1961 | 7,290,000 | 231,811 | 46,066 | 185,745 | 32.9 | 6.4 | 26.5 | -5.1 | — | — |
| 1962 | 7,450,000 | 249,113 | 50,621 | 198,492 | 35.9 | 7.1 | 28.8 | -5.3 | — | — |
| 1963 | 7,618,000 | 260,224 | 49,188 | 211,036 | 34.6 | 6.7 | 27.9 | -5.8 | — | — |
| 1964 | 7,787,000 | 266,554 | 47,996 | 218,558 | 34.8 | 6.3 | 28.5 | -6.5 | — | — |
| 1965 | 7,952,000 | 263,975 | 50,027 | 213,948 | 34.0 | 6.5 | 27.6 | -6.3 | — | — |
| 1966 | 8,110,000 | 255,413 | 50,846 | 204,567 | 32.3 | 6.4 | 25.9 | -5.9 | — | — |
| 1967 | 8,264,000 | 255,311 | 51,030 | 204,281 | 31.7 | 6.3 | 25.3 | -6.2 | — | — |
| 1968 | 8,413,000 | 246,807 | 53,920 | 192,887 | 30.1 | 6.6 | 23.5 | -5.3 | — | — |
| 1969 | 8,563,000 | 238,095 | 55,654 | 182,441 | 28.5 | 6.7 | 21.8 | -3.9 | — | — |
| 1970 | 8,715,000 | 237,019 | 53,761 | 183,258 | 27.8 | 6.3 | 21.5 | -3.7 | — | 38.7 |
| 1971 | 8,870,000 | 256,014 | 54,109 | 201,905 | 29.5 | 6.2 | 23.2 | -5.4 | — | 36.1 |
| 1972 | 9,025,000 | 247,997 | 48,534 | 199,463 | 28.0 | 5.5 | 22.5 | -5.0 | — | 28.7 |
| 1973 | 9,176,000 | 226,005 | 51,238 | 174,767 | 25.1 | 5.7 | 19.4 | -2.6 | — | 29.6 |
| 1974 | 9,315,000 | 203,066 | 51,724 | 151,342 | 22.1 | 5.6 | 16.5 | -1.3 | — | 29.3 |
| 1975 | 9,438,000 | 192,941 | 50,961 | 142,958 | 20.7 | 5.5 | 15.4 | -.2.1 | — | 27.5 |
| 1976 | 9,544,000 | 187,555 | 53,080 | 134,475 | 19.9 | 5.6 | 14.3 | -3.0 | — | 23.3 |
| 1977 | 9,634,000 | 168,960 | 56,084 | 112,876 | 17.8 | 5.9 | 11.9 | -2.4 | — | 24.9 |
| 1978 | 9,710,000 | 148,249 | 55,100 | 93,149 | 15.5 | 5.8 | 9.7 | -1.8 | — | 22.4 |
| 1979 | 9,776,000 | 143,551 | 54,838 | 88,713 | 14.9 | 5.7 | 9.2 | -2.3 | — | 19.4 |
| 1980 | 9,835,000 | 136,900 | 55,707 | 81,193 | 14.1 | 5.7 | 8.4 | -2.3 | — | 19.6 |
| 1981 | 9,886,000 | 136,211 | 57,941 | 78,397 | 13.9 | 5.9 | 8.0 | -2.8 | — | 18.5 |
| 1982 | 9,931,000 | 159,759 | 56,224 | 103,274 | 16.2 | 5.7 | 10.5 | -5.9 | — | 17.3 |
| 1983 | 9,975,000 | 165,284 | 58,348 | 106,938 | 16.6 | 5.9 | 10.8 | -6.3 | — | 16.8 |
| 1984 | 10,029,000 | 166,281 | 59,801 | 106,386 | 16.6 | 6.0 | 10.6 | -5.3 | — | 15.0 |
| 1985 | 10,097,000 | 182,067 | 64,415 | 117,637 | 18.0 | 6.4 | 11.6 | -4.9 | — | 16.5 |
| 1986 | 10,184,000 | 166,049 | 63,145 | 102,904 | 16.3 | 6.2 | 10.1 | -1.6 | — | 13.6 |
| 1987 | 10,286,000 | 179,477 | 65,079 | 114,398 | 17.4 | 6.3 | 11.1 | -1.2 | — | 13.3 |
| 1988 | 10,396,000 | 187,911 | 67,944 | 119,967 | 18.0 | 6.5 | 11.5 | -1.0 | — | 11.9 |
| 1989 | 10,504,000 | 184,891 | 67,356 | 117,535 | 17.6 | 6.4 | 11.2 | -0.9 | — | 11.1 |
| 1990 | 10,662,000 | 186,658 | 72,144 | 114,514 | 17.6 | 6.8 | 10.8 | 4.1 | — | 10.7 |
| 1991 | 10,756,000 | 173,896 | 71,709 | 102,187 | 16.3 | 6.7 | 9.6 | -0.8 | — | 10.7 |
| 1992 | 10,829,000 | 157,349 | 75,457 | 81,892 | 14.6 | 7.0 | 7.6 | -0.8 | — | 10.2 |
| 1993 | 10,895,000 | 152,226 | 78,531 | 73,695 | 14.1 | 7.3 | 6.8 | -0.7 | — | 9.4 |
| 1994 | 10,912,000 | 147,265 | 78,648 | 68,617 | 13.5 | 7.2 | 6.3 | -4.7 | — | 9.9 |
| 1995 | 10,947,000 | 147,170 | 77,937 | 69,233 | 13.5 | 7.1 | 6.3 | -3.1 | — | 9.4 |
| 1996 | 10,983,000 | 148,276 | 79,662 | 68,614 | 13.5 | 7.3 | 6.2 | -3.0 | — | 7.9 |
| 1997 | 11,033,000 | 152,681 | 77,316 | 75,365 | 13.8 | 7.0 | 6.8 | -2.3 | — | 7.2 |
| 1998 | 11,076,000 | 151,080 | 77,565 | 73,515 | 13.7 | 7.0 | 6.6 | -2.8 | — | 7.1 |
| 1999 | 11,113,000 | 150,871 | 79,499 | 71,372 | 13.6 | 7.2 | 6.4 | -3.1 | — | 6.5 |
| 2000 | 11,146,000 | 143,528 | 76,463 | 67,065 | 12.9 | 6.9 | 6.0 | -3.1 | — | 7.2 |
| 2001 | 11,168,000 | 138,718 | 79,395 | 59,323 | 12.4 | 7.1 | 5.3 | -3.3 | — | 6.2 |
| 2002 | 11,200,000 | 141,276 | 73,882 | 67,394 | 12.6 | 6.6 | 6.0 | -3.2 | — | 6.5 |
| 2003 | 11,215,000 | 136,795 | 78,434 | 58,361 | 12.2 | 7.0 | 5.2 | -3.9 | — | 6.3 |
| 2004 | 11,217,000 | 127,192 | 81,110 | 46,082 | 11.3 | 7.2 | 4.1 | -3.9 | — | 5.8 |
| 2005 | 11,218,000 | 120,716 | 84,824 | 35,892 | 10.7 | 7.5 | 3.2 | -3.1 | | 6.2 |
| 2006 | 11,202,000 | 111,323 | 80,831 | 30,492 | 9.9 | 7.2 | 2.7 | -4.1 | | 5.3 |
| 2007 | 11,188,000 | 112,472 | 81,927 | 30,545 | 10.0 | 7.2 | 2.7 | -4.0 | | 5.3 |
| 2008 | 11,173,000 | 122,569 | 86,423 | 36,146 | 10.9 | 7.7 | 3.2 | -4.6 | 1.60 | 4.7 |
| 2009 | 11,174,000 | 130,036 | 86,943 | 43,093 | 11.6 | 7.7 | 3.8 | -3.8 | 1.70 | 4.8 |
| 2010 | 11,167,934 | 127,746 | 91,065 | 36,681 | 11.4 | 8.1 | 3.3 | -3.8 | 1.69 | 4.5 |
| 2011 | 11,175,423 | 133,067 | 87,044 | 46,023 | 11.8 | 7.7 | 4.1 | -3.5 | 1.77 | 4.9 |
| 2012 | 11,173,151 | 125,674 | 89,372 | 36,302 | 11.3 | 8.0 | 3.3 | -3.5 | 1.69 | 4.6 |
| 2013 | 11,210,064 | 125,880 | 92,273 | 33,607 | 11.2 | 8.3 | 2.9 | 0.3 | 1.71 | 4.2 |
| 2014 | 11,238,317 | 122,643 | 96,330 | 26,313 | 10.9 | 8.6 | 2.3 | 0.2 | 1.68 | 4.2 |
| 2015 | 11,239,004 | 125,064 | 99,693 | 25,371 | 11.1 | 8.9 | 2.2 | -2.2 | 1.72 | 4.3 |
| 2016 | 11,239,224 | 116,872 | 99,399 | 17,473 | 10.4 | 8.8 | 1.6 | -1.5 | 1.63 | 4.3 |
| 2017 | 11,221,060 | 114,971 | 106,941 | 8,030 | 10.2 | 9.5 | 0.7 | -1.7 | 1.61 | 4.0 |
| 2018 | 11,209,628 | 116,333 | 106,201 | 10,132 | 10.4 | 9.5 | 0.9 | -1.9 | 1.65 | 4.0 |
| 2019 | 11,193,470 | 109,716 | 109,080 | 636 | 9.8 | 9.7 | 0.1 | -1.5 | 1.57 | 5.0 |
| 2020 | 11,181,595 | 105,038 | 112,439 | -7,401 | 9.4 | 10.1 | -0.7 | -0.4 | 1.52 | 4.9 |
| 2021 | 11,113,215 | 99,096 | 167,645 | -68,549 | 8.9 | 15.0 | -6.1 | 0 | 1.47 | 7.5 |
| 2022 | 11,089,511 | 95,403 | 120,098 | -24,695 | 8.6 | 10.8 | -2.2 | 0.1 | 1.52 | 7.5 |
| 2023 | 10,055,968 | 90,392 | 117,739 | -27,347 | 9.0 | 11.1 | -2.1 | -91.3 | 1.54 | 7.1 |
| 2024 | 9,748,532 | 71,358 | 128,098 | -56,740 | 7.2 | 12.9 | -5.7 | -25.3 | 1.29 | 7.1 |
| 2025 | 9,436,440 | 68,064 | 136,214 | -68,150 | 7.1 | 14.2 | -7.1 | -25.6 | 1.29 | 9.9 |

Source: National Office of Statistics of and Information of Cuba (ONEI)

=== Fertility ===
| Years | 1900 | 1901 | 1902 | 1903 | 1904 | 1905 | 1906 | 1907 | 1908 | 1909 |
|---|---|---|---|---|---|---|---|---|---|---|
| Total Fertility Rate in Cuba | 4.55 | 5.09 | 5.63 | 5.67 | 5.70 | 5.74 | 5.78 | 5.82 | 5.82 | 5.81 |

| Years | 1910 | 1911 | 1912 | 1913 | 1914 | 1915 | 1916 | 1917 | 1918 | 1919 |
|---|---|---|---|---|---|---|---|---|---|---|
| Total Fertility Rate in Cuba | 5.81 | 5.81 | 5.80 | 5.80 | 5.80 | 5.79 | 5.79 | 5.79 | 5.78 | 5.78 |

| Years | 1920 | 1921 | 1922 | 1923 | 1924 | 1925 | 1926 | 1927 | 1928 | 1929 |
|---|---|---|---|---|---|---|---|---|---|---|
| Total Fertility Rate in Cuba | 5.67 | 5.57 | 5.46 | 5.35 | 5.25 | 5.14 | 5.03 | 4.93 | 4.82 | 4.71 |

| Years | 1930 | 1931 | 1932 | 1933 | 1934 | 1935 | 1936 | 1937 | 1938 | 1939 |
|---|---|---|---|---|---|---|---|---|---|---|
| Total Fertility Rate in Cuba | 4.61 | 4.50 | 4.46 | 4.42 | 4.38 | 4.33 | 4.29 | 4.25 | 4.21 | 4.17 |

| Years | 1940 | 1941 | 1942 | 1943 | 1944 | 1945 | 1946 | 1947 |
|---|---|---|---|---|---|---|---|---|
| Total Fertility Rate in Cuba | 4.13 | 4.08 | 4.04 | 4.00 | 4.11 | 4.22 | 4.32 | 4.43 |

=== Life expectancy at birth ===
Life expectancy in Cuba since 1899

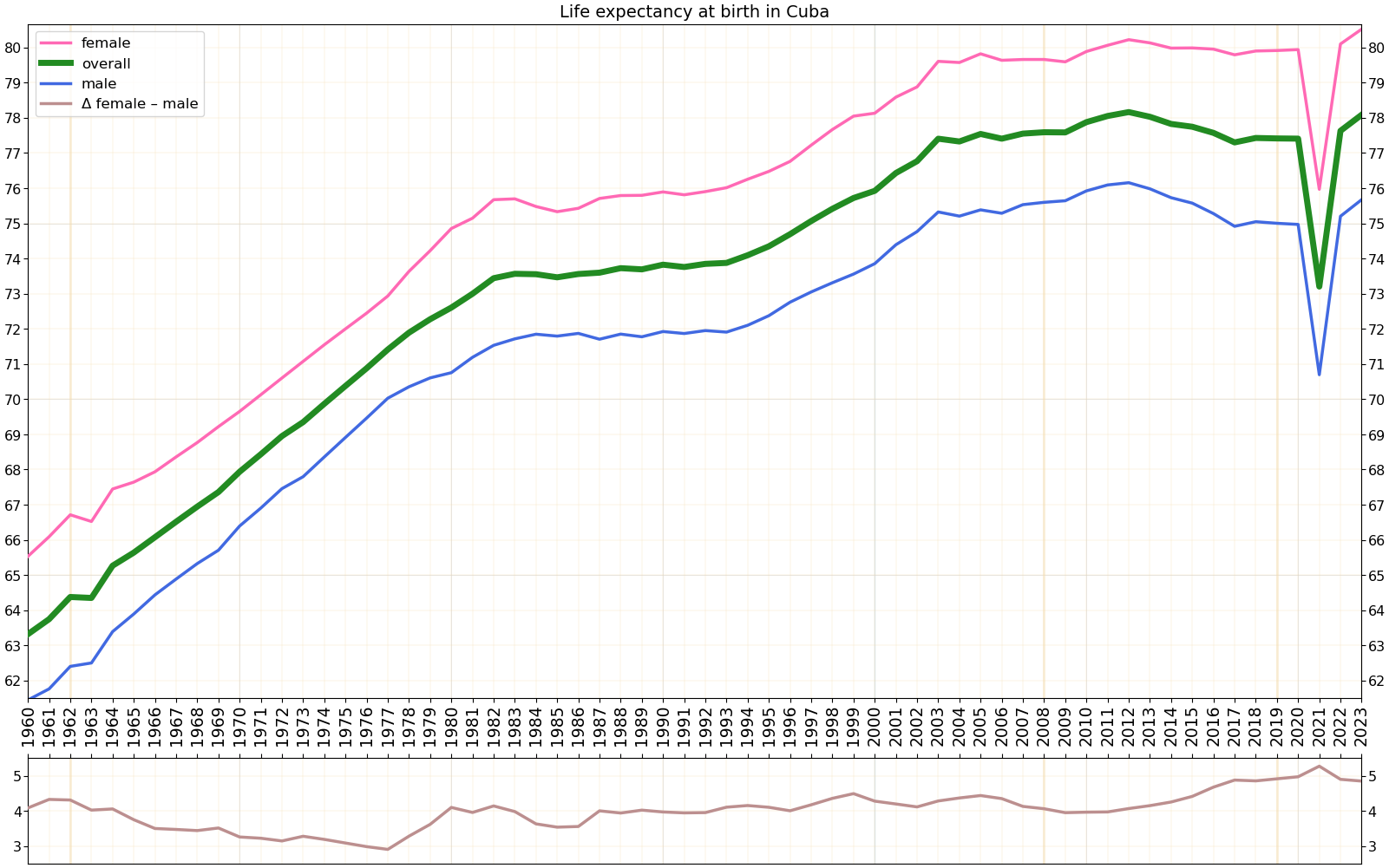
Life expectancy in Cuba since 1960 by gender

Total population: 79.64 years. Country comparison to the world: 59th
Male: 77.29 years
Female: 82.14 years (2022 est.)

== Racial groups ==
| Year | White | Multiracial (Mulatos/Mestizos) | Black |
|---|---|---|---|
| 2002 | 65.06% | 24.86% | 10.08% |
| 2012 | 64.12% | 26.62% | 9.26% |

| Race | census 1774 | | census 1792 | | census 1817 | | census 1827 | | census 1841 | | census 1861 | | census 1877 | | census 1887 | | census 1899 | | census 1907 | |
| Race | Number | % | Number | % | Number | % | Number | % | Number | % | Number | % | Number | % | Number | % | Number | % | Number | % |
|---|---|---|---|---|---|---|---|---|---|---|---|---|---|---|---|---|---|---|---|---|
| White Cubans | 96,440 | 56.2 | 133,553 | 48.8 | 238,910 | 43.2 | 311,051 | 44.2 | 418,291 | 41.5 | 793,484 | 58.1 | 981,039 | 65.0 | 1,102,889 | 68.5 | 1,052,397 | 66.9 | 1,428,176 | 69.7 |
| Afro-Cubans | 50,249 | 29.3 | 94,380 | 34.4 | 221,766 | 40.1 | 393,436 | 55.8 | 490,305 | 48.7 | 537,914 | 39.4 | 481,136 | 31.9 | 482,176 | 30.0 | 234,738 | 14.9 | 274,272 | 13.4 |
| Mestizo | 24,931 | 14.5 | 46,046 | 16.8 | 92,357 | 16.7 | 393,436 | 55.8 | 99,028 | 9.8 | 537,914 | 39.4 | 481,136 | 31.9 | 482,176 | 30.0 | 270,805 | 17.2 | 334,695 | 16.3 |
| Asian | | | | | | | | | | | 34,834 | 2.5 | 47,116 | 3.1 | 24,010 | 1.5 | 14,857 | 1.0 | 11,837 | 0.6 |
| Total | 171,620 | | 273,979 | | 553,033 | | 704,487 | | 1,007,624 | | 1,366,232 | | 1,509,291 | | 1,609,075 | | 1,572,797 | | 2,048,980 | |

| Race | census 1919 | | census 1931 | | census 1943 | | census 1953 | | census 1981 | | census 2002 | | census 2012 | |
| Race | Number | % | Number | % | Number | % | Number | % | Number | % | Number | % | Number | % |
|---|---|---|---|---|---|---|---|---|---|---|---|---|---|---|
| White Cubans | 2,088,047 | 72.2 | 2,856,956 | 72.1 | 3,553,312 | 74.3 | 4,243,956 | 72.8 | 6,415,468 | 66.0 | 7,271,926 | 65.06 | 7,160,399 | 64.12 |
| Mestizo | 461,694 | 16.0 | 641,337 | 16.2 | 743,113 | 15.6 | 843,105 | 12.4 | 2,125,418 | 21.9 | 2,658,675 | 24.86 | 2,972,882 | 26.62 |
| Afro-Cubans | 323,117 | 11.2 | 437,769 | 11.0 | 463,227 | 9.7 | 725,311 | 14.5 | 1,168,695 | 12.0 | 1,126,894 | 10.08 | 1,034,044 | 9.26 |
| Asian | 16,146 | 0.6 | 26,282 | 0.7 | 18,931 | 0.4 | 16,657 | 0.3 | 14,024 | 0.1 | 112,268 | 1.02 | | |
| Total | 2,889,004 | | 3,962,344 | | 4,778,583 | | 5,829,029 | | 9,723,605 | | 11,177,743 | | 11,167,325 | |

| Age group | Cuba 100% (percent of the population) | White 64,12% (percent in the race/percent in the age group) | Black 9,26% (percent in the race/percent in the age group) | Mulatto/Mestizo 26,62% (percent in the race/percent in the age group) |
|---|---|---|---|---|
| Population | 11 167 325 | 7 160 399 | 1 034 044 | 2 972 882 |
| 0 | 131 419 (1,18%) | 91 432 (1,28%/69,57%) | 5 368 (0,52%/4,08%) | 34 619 (1,16%/26,34%) |
| 0-4 | 625 192 (5,60%) | 412 604 (5,76%/66,00%) | 31 828 (3,08%/5,09%) | 180 760 (6,08%/28,91%) |
| 5-9 | 594 099 (5,32%) | 372 304 (5,20%/62,67%) | 38 481 (3,72%/6,48%) | 183 314 (6,17%/30,86%) |
| 10-14 | 703 271 (6,30%) | 439 406 (6,14%/62,48%) | 52 121 (5,04%/7,41%) | 211 744 (7,12%/30,11%) |
| 15-19 | 704 126 (6,31%) | 434 944 (6,07%/61,77%) | 57 638 (5,57%/8,19%) | 211 544 (7,12%/30,04%) |
| 20-24 | 826 658 (7,40%) | 511 488 (7,14%/61,87%) | 71 570 (6,92%/8,66%) | 243 600 (8,19%/29,47%) |
| 25-29 | 755 729 (6,77%) | 463 004 (6,47%/61,27%) | 69 282 (6,70%/9,17%) | 223 443 (7,52%/29,57%) |
| 30-34 | 623 480 (5,58%) | 380 742 (5,32%/61,07%) | 61 368 (5,93%/9,84%) | 181 370 (6,10%/29,09%) |
| 35-39 | 838 631 (7,51%) | 520 668 (7,27%/62,09%) | 82 640 (7,99%/9,85%) | 235 323 (7,92%/28,06%) |
| 40-44 | 1 015 022 (9,09%) | 635 473 (8,87%/62,61%) | 103 827 (10,04%/10,23%) | 275 722 (9,27%/27,16%) |
| 45-49 | 1 041 213 (9,32%) | 662 297 (9,25%/63,61%) | 111 934 (10,82%/10,75%) | 266 982 (8,98%/25,64%) |
| 50-54 | 774 499 (6,94%) | 492 046 (6,87%/63,53%) | 85 145 (8,23%/10,99%) | 197 308 (6,64%/25,48%) |
| 55-59 | 624 013 (5,59%) | 401 361 (5,61%/64,32%) | 68 511 (6,63%/10,98%) | 154 141 (5,18%/24,70%) |
| 60-64 | 564 635 (5,06%) | 383 286 (5,35%/67,88%) | 58 247 (5,63%/10,32%) | 123 102 (4,14%/21,80%) |
| 65-69 | 480 917 (4,31%) | 335 144 (4,68%/69,69%) | 46 826 (4,53%/9,74%) | 98 947 (3,33%/20,57%) |
| 70-74 | 380 897 (3,41%) | 269 331 (3,76%/70,71%) | 36 701 (3,55%/9,64%) | 74 865 (2,52%/19,65%) |
| 75-79 | 264 923 (2,37%) | 188 653 (2,63%/71,21%) | 25 867 (2,50%/9,76%) | 50 403 (1,70%/19,03%) |
| 80-84 | 179 670 (1,61%) | 131 158 (1,83%/73,00%) | 17 011 (1,65%/9,47%) | 31 501 (1,06%/17,53%) |
| 85+ | 170 350 (1,53%) | 126 490 (1,77%/74,25%) | 15 047 (1,46%/8,83%) | 28 813 (0,97%/16,91%) |

| Age group | Cuba (percent of the population) | White (percent in the race/percent in the age group) | Black (percent in the race/percent in the age group) | Mulatto/Mestizo (percent in the race/percent in the age group) |
|---|---|---|---|---|
| 0-14 | 1 922 562 (17,22%) | 1 224 314 (17,10%/63,68%) | 122 430 (11,84%/6,37%) | 575 818 (19,37%/29,95%) |
| 15-64 | 7 768 006 (69,56%) | 4 885 309 (68,23%/62,89%) | 770 162 (74,48%/9,91%) | 2 112 535 (71,06%/27,20%) |
| 65+ | 1 476 757 (13,22%) | 1 050 776 (14,67%/71,15%) | 141 452 (13,68%/9,58%) | 284 529 (9,57%/19,27%) |

=== Ancestral origins ===
Official census 1775-1899
| White | | | Non-white | |
| Census | Number | Percentage | Number | Percentage |
|---|---|---|---|---|
| 1775 | 96,440 | 56.2 | 75,180 | 43.8 |
| 1792 | 153,559 | 56.4 | 118,741 | 43.6 |
| 1817 | 257,380 | 45.0 | 314,983 | 55.0 |
| 1827 | 311,051 | 44.2 | 393,435 | 55.8 |
| 1841 | 418,291 | 41.5 | 589,333 | 58.5 |
| 1861 | 793,484 | 56.8 | 603,046 | 43.2 |
| 1877 | 1,023,394 | 67.8 | 485,897 | 32.2 |
| 1887 | 1,102,889 | 67.6 | 528,798 | 32.4 |
| 1899 | 1,067,354 | 67.9 | 505,443 | 32.1 |

According to the previous censuses, the Chinese were counted as white. The ancestry of Cubans comes from many sources:

- (Spain) Spanish

During the 18th, 19th and early part of the 20th century, large waves of Spanish immigrants from Canary Islands, Catalonia, Andalusia, Galicia, and Asturias emigrated to Cuba. Between 1820 and 1898, a total of 508,455 people left Spain, and more than 750,000 Spanish immigrants left for Cuba between 1899 and 1930, with many returning to Spain. There are 139,851 Spanish citizens living in Cuba as of 1 January 2018.

- (Canary Islands) Canary Islanders
- (Catalonia) Catalans
- (Andalusia) Andalusians
- (Galicia (Spain)) Galicians
- (Asturias) Asturians

The Slave trade brought Africans to Cuba during its early history: Between 1842 and 1873, 221,000 African slaves entered Cuba.

- Africans

People of the Americas:

- (Haiti) Haitians
- (Jamaica) Jamaicans

Other European people that have contributed include:

- (Germany) Germans
- (France) French
- (Portugal) Portuguese
- (Italy) Italians
- (Russia) Russians

People from Asia:

- (China) Chinese
- (South Korea) Koreans
- (Philippines) Filipino
- (Lebanon) Lebanese, (Syria) Syrian, (Egypt) Egyptian, (Palestine) Palestinian (Arab Cubans)

Between 1842 and 1873, 124,800 Chinese arrived.

=== Genetics ===
An autosomal study from 2014 has found out the genetic average ancestry in Cuba to be 72% European, 20% African and 8% Native American with different proportions depending on the self-reported ancestry (White, Mulatto or Mestizo, and Black):

| Self-reported ancestry | European | African | Native American |
|---|---|---|---|
| White | 86% | 6.7% | 7.8% |
| Mulatto/Mestizo | 63.8% | 25.5% | 10.7% |
| Black | 29% | 65.5% | 5.5% |

A 1995 study done on the population of Pinar del Rio, found that 50% of the Mt-DNA lineages (female lineages) could be traced back to Europeans, 46% to Africans and 4% to Native Americans. This figure is consistent with both the historical background of the region, and the current demographics of it.

According to another study in 2008, the Native American contribution to present-day Cubans accounted for 33% of the maternal lineages, whereas Africa and Eurasia contributed 45% and 22% of the lineages, respectively. Haplogroup A2 is the main Native American haplogroup in Cuba (21.9% of the total sample), accounting for 67% of the Native American mtDNA gene pool. Regarding Y-chromosome haplogroups (male lineages), 78.8% of the sequences found in Cubans are of West Eurasian origin, 19.7% of African origin and 1.5% of East Asian origin. Among the West Eurasian fraction, the vast majority of individuals belong to West European haplogroup R1b. The African lineages found in Cubans have a Western (haplogroups E1, E2, E1b1a) and Northern (E1b1b-M81) African origin. The "Berber" haplogroup E1b1b1b (E-M81), is found at a frequency of 6.1%.

According to Fregel et al. (2009), the fact that autochthonous male North African E-M81 and female U6 lineages from the Canaries have been detected in Cuba and Iberoamerica, demonstrates that Canary Islanders with indigenous ancestors actively participated in the American colonization.

==== Y-DNA ====
| N | E-M33 | E-M75 | E-M2 | E1b1b-M35 | E1b1b-M78 | E1b1b-M81 | E1b1b-M123 | G | I | J2 | T | R1a | R1b | N/O | O-P31 |
|---|---|---|---|---|---|---|---|---|---|---|---|---|---|---|---|
| 132 | 0.8% | 1.5% | 9.8% | 1.5% | 4.5% | 6.1% | 1.5% | 6.1% | 8.3% | 6.1% | 1.5% | 1.5% | 50.8% | 0.8% | 0.8% |

==== mtDNA ====
| N | L | U6 | A | B | C | D | H | I1 | J* | J2a | J1b | J2 | K | T* | T1a | T2 | T | U* | U4 | U4a2 | U5a | V | W |
|---|---|---|---|---|---|---|---|---|---|---|---|---|---|---|---|---|---|---|---|---|---|---|---|
| 245 | 43.3% | 2% | 22.4% | 2% | 5.3% | 3.3% | 9% | 0.4% | 2.4% | 0.4% | 0.4% | 0.4% | 0.8% | 0.4% | 0.8% | 0.8% | 0.8% | 0.8% | 0.8% | 1.2% | 0.8% | 0.8% | 0.4% |

== Language ==
Spanish is the official language of Cuba, as specified by the Constitution of Cuba. Of all the regional variations of Spanish, Cuban Spanish is most similar to, and originates largely from, Canary Island Spanish. This is a consequence of Canarian migration, which in the 19th and early 20th century was heavy and continuous. There were also migrations of Galicians and Asturians as well, but they did not impact Cuban Spanish to the same degree. Contact in Cuba between Yoruba language dialects and Spanish, starting in the 19th century, led to the creation of a new language called Anagó.

Many of the Cuban replacements for Madrid vocabulary stems from Canarian lexicon. For example, guagua (bus), as opposed to autobús in Madrid, originated in the Canaries and is onomatopoeia from the sound of a klaxon (wah-wah!). Another example of a Canarian word is the verb fajarse (to fight). In Madrid the verb is pelearse, while fajar being a non-reflexive verb related to the hemming of a skirt.

The second-most spoken indigenous language of Cuba is Cuban Sign Language.

Haitian Creole dates back to the late 18th century, when people fled the Haitian Revolution to Cuba. However, speakers today are more recent immigrants and their children. Other languages spoken by immigrants in substantial numbers are Mandarin, Hindi, Levantine Arabic, Catalan and Russian; Yucatec and Galician were spoken in the 20th century.

Two folk-religious liturgical languages are Lucumi for Santería and Habla Congo for the Palo religion.

At the time of the Spanish conquest, the main language was the Ciboney dialect of Taíno. Classic Taíno was spoken in the east by migrants who began arriving from Hispaniola after 1450, and the unattested Guanahatabey was spoken by hunter-gatherers in the far west. All are now extinct. A possible creole language that later developed among the African population, Bozal Spanish, is also extinct.

English is a mandatory subject in Cuban education, starting in primary school, and so is the second language of much of the population. A third language is encouraged.

== Religion ==
Cuba has a multitude of faiths reflecting the island's diverse cultural elements. Catholicism, which was brought to the island by Spanish colonialists at the beginning of the 16th century, is the most prevalent professed faith. After the revolution, Cuba became an officially atheistic state and restricted religious practice. Since the Fourth Cuban Communist Party Congress in 1991, restrictions have been eased and, according to the National Catholic Observer, direct challenges by state institutions to the right to religion have all but disappeared, though the Church still faces restrictions of written and electronic communication, and can only accept donations from state-approved funding sources. The Roman Catholic Church is made up of the Cuban Catholic Bishops' Conference (COCC), led by Jaime Lucas Ortega y Alamino, Cardinal Archbishop of Havana. It has eleven dioceses, 56 orders of nuns and 24 orders of priests. In January 1998, Pope John Paul II paid a historic visit to the island, invited by the Cuban government and Catholic Church.

Afro-Cuban religions, a blend of native African religions and Roman Catholicism, are widely practiced in Cuba. This diversity derives from West and Central Africans who were transported to Cuba, and in effect reinvented their African religions. They did so by combining them with elements of the Catholic belief system, with a result very similar to Brazil. One of these Afro-Cuban religions is Santeria.

Protestantism, introduced from the United States in the 18th century, has seen a steady increase in popularity. 300,000 Cubans belong to the island's 54 Protestant denominations. Pentecostalism has grown rapidly in recent years, and the Assemblies of God alone claims a membership of over 167 000 people. The Episcopal Church of Cuba claims 10,000 adherents. Cuba has small communities of Jews, Muslims, Buddhists and members of the Baháʼí Faith.

== See also ==
- Cuban American
- Afro-Cuban
- Haitian Cuban
- Isleños
- Chinese Cuban
- Jewish Cuban
- Women in Cuba
- Provinces of Cuba
