= 1931 population census in Bosnia and Herzegovina =

Sixth Census of Bosnia and Herzegovina
31 March 1931

General information
- Country: Bosnia and Herzegovina

Results
- Total population: 2,323,555

Population of Bosnia and Herzegovina in 1931 by religion
1. Serbian Orthodox Christians (44.2%)
2. Sunni Muslims (30.9%)
3. Catholics (23.6%)
4. Protestants (0.31%)
5. Others (0.96%)

The 1931 population census in Bosnia and Herzegovina was the sixth census of the population of Bosnia and Herzegovina. On the territory of 51,564 km^{2} 2,323,555 persons lived. The Kingdom of Yugoslavia conducted a population census on 31 March 1931.

== Results by religion ==
=== Bosnia and Herzegovina ===
Religion	Number	Percentage	Number change	Percentage change
Serbian Orthodox Christians	1,028,139	44.25%	▲198,849	▲0.38%
Sunni Muslims	718,079	30.90%	▲129,835	▼0.17%
Catholics	547,949	23.58%	▲103,641	▲0.75%
Protestants	7,094	0.31%	unknown	unknown
Others	22,294	0.96%	unknown	unknown

=== Results by administrative units ===
The Kingdom was divided into Banovinas. Banovinas were divided into districts, and districts into municipalities. Below is a result of census by administrative units:

Absolute majority

Serbian Orthodox Christians
Muslims
Catholics
Protestants

Relative majority

Serbian Orthodox Christians
Muslims
Catholics
Protestants

==== Littoral Banovina ====
Littoral Banovina in Yugoslavia

Population of Bosnian part of Littoral Banovina in 1931 by religion
1. Catholics (63.5%)
2. Sunni Muslims (20.8%)
3. Serbian Orthodox Christians (15.6%)
4. Protestants (0.02%)
5. Others (0.08%)

Unit	Total population	Serbian Orthodox Christians	Muslims	Catholics	Protestants	Others
Bosnian part of Littoral Banovina	307,651	48,043	63,995	195,329	50	234
District Bugojno
Bugojno	15,960	3,577	5,518	6,182	2	51
Gornji Vakuf	10,893	13	5,570	5,310	-	-
Kupres	16,094	8,977	681	6,436	-	-
Total	42,947	12,567	11,769	18,558	2	51
District Duvno
Brišnik	7,139	152	423	6,564	-	-
Grabovica	7,103	69	1	7,033	-	-
Oplećani	4,341	824	468	3,049	-	-
Tomislav-grad	1,636	170	926	540	-	-
Vir	5,931	7	1	5,923	-	-
Total	26,150	1,222	1,819	23,109	-	-
District Konjic
Bjelemić	3,980	482	2,961	537	-	-
Konjic-grad	13,527	3,661	5,418	4,432	5	11
Ostrožac	14,682	596	8,314	5,766	2	4
Total	32,189	4,739	16,693	10,735	7	15
District Livno
Donje Polje	6,214	4,243	-	1,971	-	-
Gornje Polje	14,556	999	1,122	12,435	-	-
Livno	4,327	669	1,890	1,760	-	8
Priluka	4,477	54	181	4,242	-	-
Šujica	3,686	331	110	3,245	-	-
Total	33,260	6,296	3,303	23,653	-	8
District Ljubuški
Drinovci	11,611	11	3	11,597	-	-
Humac	6,475	1	21	6,453	-	-
Ljubuški	3,355	144	2,004	1,204	-	3
Posušje	12,583	14	10	12,559	-	-
Vitina	9,494	9	291	9,194	-	-
Zvirovići	5,241	-	50	5,191	-	-
Total	48,759	179	2,379	46,198	-	3
District Stolac
Aladinići	9,340	1,526	3,256	4,558	-	-
Berkovići	4,918	3,871	689	358	-	-
Burmazi	5,428	1,258	976	3,193	1	-
Čapljina	12,360	2,772	2,797	6,786	3	2
Hutovo	4,949	190	209	4,550	-	-
Stolac	4,161	693	2,705	762	-	1
Total	41,156	10,310	10,632	20,207	4	3
District Mostar
Bijelo Polje	4,636	2,188	1,288	1,160	-	-
Blagaj	6,731	1,537	3,937	1,257	-	-
Donje Brotnjo	4,561	26	140	4,395	-	-
Drežnica	2,929	156	1,367	1,406	-	-
Gornje Brotnjo	4,917	1	61	4,855	-	-
Kočerin	6,617	1	-	6,616	-	-
Mostar-grad	20,295	5,502	8,844	5,764	32	153
Mostar	12,009	2,967	882	8,424	5	1
Mostarsko Blato	5,824	29	29	5,766	-	-
Žitomislić	3,771	541	850	2,380	-	-
Total	83,190	12,730	17,400	52,869	37	154

==== Vrbas Banovina ====
Vrbas Banovina in Yugoslavia

Population of Vrbas Banovina in 1931 by religion
1. Serbian Orthodox Christians (57.9%)
2. Sunni Muslims (24.1%)
3. Catholics (16.7%)
4. Protestants (0.32%)
5. Others (1.00%)

Unit	Total population	Serbian Orthodox Christians	Muslims	Catholics	Protestants	Others
Vrbas Banovina	1,037,382	600,529	250,265	172,787	3,377	10,424
District Banja Luka
Banja Luka, grad	22,165	6,769	8,039	6,486	157	714
Bronzani Majdan	6,234	4,211	743	1,280	-	-
Budžak	4,441	830	21	3,554	5	31
Čelinac	6,244	2,943	1,458	1,688	16	139
Dragočaj	6,083	1,289	-	4,792	-	2
Jošavka	2,598	2,573	-	18	-	7
Kadin Voda	6,844	6,832	-	10	-	1
Klašnice	5,855	3,985	99	1,659	16	96
Krupa	7,502	6,913	563	24	-	2
Maglajani	5,775	3,571	10	2,082	50	62
Piskavica	8,186	5,444	16	2,676	-	50
Rekavice	5,355	5,131	27	197	-	-
Saračica	5,859	4,655	50	1,143	9	2
Slatina	4,861	3,584	4	1,087	3	183
Total	98,002	58,730	11,030	26,696	256	1,290
District Bihać
Bihać	8,374	1,320	4,739	2,149	5	161
Lipa	5,027	4,491	410	126	-	-
Ličko Petrovo; Selo	3,830	2,583	4	1,240	-	3
Pokoj	4,438	1,672	2,717	49	-	-
Ripać	6,604	4,443	1,568	593	-	-
Vrkašić	2,517	636	823	1,058	-	-
Vrsta	5,400	1,560	3,700	139	-	1
Zavalje	3,119	473	1	2,645	-	-
Total	39,309	17,178	13,962	7,999	5	165
District Bosanska Dubica
Bosanska Dubica	11,100	6,685	3,028	1,201	167	19
Knezpolje	8,301	8,232	5	57	1	6
Moštanica	7,271	6,930	3	338	-	-
Ravnjani	6,457	6,274	3	45	134	1
Total	33,129	28,121	3,039	1,641	302	26
District Bosanska Gradiška
Bistrica	4,582	4,301	1	100	156	24
Bosanska Gradiška	6,524	1,558	3,968	846	25	127
Cerovljani	3,468	1,923	10	793	482	260
Laminci	6,834	3,739	329	2,663	25	78
Nova Topola	10,010	5,918	1,451	2,360	209	72
Orahovo	1,894	340	1,328	212	14	-
Podgradci	7,032	6,365	65	495	69	38
Romanovci	6,216	5,740	172	293	-	11
Stapari	4,139	4,045	9	79	-	6
Turjak	6,536	5,692	2	841	-	1
Total	57,235	39,621	7,335	8,682	980	617
District Bosanska Krupa
Bosanska Krupa	8,642	4,632	3,769	232	3	6
Bužim	10,369	4,596	5,763	10	-	-
Grmeč	7,654	7,349	267	38	-	-
Otoka	11,166	6,518	4,584	63	-	1
Velika Rujiška	9,115	8,407	704	1	-	-
Total	46,946	31,502	15,087	347	3	2
District Bosanski Novi
Bosanska Kostajnica	9,717	8,327	938	446	-	6
Bosanski Novi	4,024	1,120	2,439	444	2	19
Čađavica	4,279	4,226	49	3	1	-
Dobrljin	4,222	3,709	493	3	1	-
Japra	7,126	4,710	29	446	2	6
Ravnice	4,029	4,674	2	91	2	6
Svodna	5,340	4,674	278	355	-	33
Total	38,737	30,694	6,110	1,861	5	67
District Bosanski Petrovac
Bosanski Petrovac	15,347	11,348	3,311	664	5	19
Krnjeuša	3,525	3,131	-	394	-	-
Kulen Vakuf	9,983	6,527	2,987	460	-	9
Vođenica	3,702	3,641	-	61	-	-
Total	32,557	24,647	6,298	1,579	5	28
District Bosansko Grahovo
Bosansko Grahovo	12,404	11,280	23	1,101	-	-
Drvar	8,627	8,293	22	305	6	1
Trubar	5,087	5,071	3	13	-	-
Total	26,118	24,644	48	1,419	6	1
District Cazin
Cazin	16,158	308	5,771	78	-	1
Ostrozac	4,036	1,593	2,427	16	-	-
Pećigrad	7,491	120	7,306	65	-	-
Stijena	3,896	1,261	2,633	2	-	-
Tržačka Raštela	7,055	2,501	4,533	21	-	-
Velika Kladuša	8,990	1,032	7,262	694	-	1
Vrnograč	9,657	4,257	5,381	19	-	-
Total	47,283	11,072	35,313	895	-	3
District Derventa
Bosanski Brod	7,386	3,604	1,044	2,587	39	112
Bosanski Klakar	6,078	3,515	10	2,535	-	18
Derventa	5,190	2,299	124	2,554	31	182
Derventa, grad	6,654	976	3,367	2,050	43	218
Dubočac	4,439	697	462	3,164	58	58
Kotorsko	5,948	1,337	1,798	2,813	-	-
Lužani Mulabegovi	5,059	2,380	6	2,641	-	32
Majevac	3,438	1,978	239	1,217	-	4
Plehan	6,289	154	34	5,998	17	86
Podnovlje	3,977	2,549	1	1,344	58	25
Sijekovac	6,589	1,275	1,150	4,405	-	29
Velika Sočanica	5,988	3,167	15	2,796	-	10
Total	67,305	23,931	8,250	34,104	246	774
District Doboj
Bukovica	3,085	2,517	448	115	-	5
Doboj, grad	4,881	764	2,577	1,429	34	23
Tešanj, grad	7,435	515	5,597	1,289	6	28
Vojvoda Putnik	8,518	31	4,549	3,793	133	12
Total	23,919	3,827	13,171	6,626	173	122
District Dvor
Divuša	4,094	3,209	5	880	-	-
Dvor	7,039	5,911	1	1,089	-	38
Javoranj	4,018	4,013	-	5	-	-
Rujevac	5,731	5,326	1	396	5	3
Zrin	2,192	1,498	-	693	-	1
Žirovac	3,505	3,495	-	10	-	-
Total	26,579	23,452	7	3,073	5	42
District Glamoč
Glamoč, grad	9,093	5,027	3,108	958	-	-
Prekaja	8,834	8,301	32	101	-	-
Vagan	7,350	6,596	467	283	-	4
Total	24,877	19,924	3,607	1,342	-	4
District Gračanica
Bosansko Petrovo; Selo	7,124	4,510	2,571	41	-	2
Doborovci	5,926	13	5,869	44	-	-
Gračanica	4,581	726	3,700	125	1	29
Karanovac	4,550	3,371	1,146	33	-	-
Lukavica	5,499	2,233	3,266	-	-	-
Osječani	5,483	4,460	1,001	22	-	-
Srnice	4,760	1,193	2,647	920	-	-
Stanić-Rijeka	6,931	2,780	4,090	61	-	-
Špionica	5,901	700	4,262	939	-	-
Zelinja	5,004	1,290	3,713	1	-	-
Total	55,759	21,276	32,265	2,186	-	-
District Gradačac
Donja Dubica	2,635	1,131	2	1,497	2	3
Donji Skugrić	4,821	3,390	235	1,194	-	2
Dugo Polje	2,684	2,168	2	507	-	7
Gradačac	8,138	193	7,625	274	-	46
Kladari	4,783	1,582	-	3,201	-	-
Modriča	5,203	430	3,436	1,323	1	13
Novi Grad	6,050	2,453	4	3,350	243	-
Odžak	6,695	972	3,206	2,513	1	3
Vlaška Mahala	5,148	153	7	4,988	-	-
Vranjak	4,835	3,985	4	838	8	-
Total	50,992	16,457	14,521	19,685	255	74
District Jajce
Donji Vakuf	10,034	5,094	4,250	685	-	5
Jajce	7,517	643	3,692	3,140	9	33
Janja	6,665	6,653	7	5	-	-
Jezero	4,415	2,676	932	807	-	-
Pljeva	8,705	6,357	2,310	38	-	-
Seoci	5,735	67	731	4,937	-	-
Vinac	5,439	2,686	2,283	468	-	-
Total	48,510	24,176	14,205	10,080	9	40
District Ključ
Gornja Sanica	7,958	4,921	2,695	328	10	4
Gornji Ribnik	8,041	7,674	344	23	-	-
Ključ	8,953	2,932	5,035	975	2	9
Sitnica	8,437	8,271	122	39	1	4
Vrhpolje	3,899	1,016	2,705	178	-	-
Total	37,288	24,814	10,901	1,543	13	17
District Kotor Varoš
Kotor Varoš	1,824	163	838	820	-	-
Maslovare	3,777	3,498	61	213	-	5
Skender Vakuf	4,371	3,851	512	8	-	-
Šiprage	5,188	3,962	1,344	143	-	9
Vagani	4,098	3,141	219	738	-	-
Vrbanjci	3,662	1,026	1,341	1,295	-	-
Zabrđe	4,316	1,775	557	1,976	1	7
Total	27,236	17,146	4,872	5,193	1	24
District Maglaj
Maglaj, grad	4,195	270	3,760	154	-	11
Maglaj, selo	11,982	5,819	3,835	2,325	-	3
Osojnica	3,970	2,764	1,188	18	-	-
Total	20,147	8,853	8,783	2,497	-	14
District Mrkonjić-grad
Baraći	4,874	4,836	9	29	-	-
Bjelaice	4,626	2,080	837	1,709	-	-
Gerzovo	5,203	4,836	328	38	-	1
Gustovara	3,988	3,743	98	147	-	-
Mrkonić-grad	4,239	2,412	1,313	511	-	-
Podrašnica	4,084	4,084	-	-	-	-
Total	27,014	21,991	2,585	2,434	-	4
District Prijedor
Kozarac, grad	10,303	1,831	7,448	424	4	596
Ljubija	11,396	3,336	4,056	3,950	7	47
Marička	5,261	5,072	-	23	-	166
Omarska	6,697	6,642	2	43	1	9
Palančište	6,224	5,261	772	176	-	15
Prijedor	6,623	2,600	2,836	1,071	20	96
Rakelići	5,229	4,007	881	265	11	65
Sanska Dragotinja	4,186	4,001	118	54	13	-
Total	55,919	32,750	16,113	6,006	50	1000
District Prnjavor
Bosanski Kobaš	2,075	948	721	394	-	12
Bosanski Svinjar	4,598	3,147	584	744	11	112
Gornji Smrtići	4,163	2,461	25	1,637	1	39
Hrvaćani	9,995	6,891	1	1,782	-	1,321
Kokori	4,150	3,664	4	131	-	351
Lepenica	5,601	3,196	15	1,860	-	530
Lišnja	7,305	3,317	1,994	1992	-	1,052
Nožičko	6,278	3,783	38	2,341	-	116
Prnjavor, grad	2,667	655	1,089	526	16	391
Strpci	5,985	3,555	12	1,007	889	522
Velika Ilova	5,395	3,691	266	1,060	-	378
Vijačani	5,431	3,656	-	837	-	938
Total	63,653	38,964	4,699	13,311	917	5,762
District Sanski Most
Budimlić Japra	5,292	4,048	576	668	-	-
Dabar	5,879	4,900	175	804	-	-
Gornji Kamengrad	6,518	2,377	4,090	51	-	-
Lušci-Palanka	4,583	4,534	31	11	-	7
Sanski Most	4,629	1,347	2,624	596	-	62
Sasina	4,183	1,203	630	2,313	-	37
Stari Majdan	6,844	4,672	2,048	1,923	1	-
Tomina	7,049	5,204	1,478	361	-	6
Total	46,777	28,285	11,652	6,727	1	112
District Teslić
Blatnica	7,421	4,707	662	2,047	3	2
Čečava	4,054	3,991	23	40	-	-
Osinja	7,800	7,421	8	259	-	112
Snjegotina	2,375	2,337	1	37	-	-
Stanari	5,622	3,596	676	1,328	5	17
Teslić	14,819	6,422	5,042	3,150	136	69
Total	42,091	28,474	6,412	6,861	144	200

==== Drina Banovina ====
Unit	Total population	Serbian Orthodox Christians	Muslims	Catholics	Protestants	Others
Bosnian part of Drina Banovina						
District Bijeljina
Batković	3,109	3,068	6	22	13	-
Bijeljina	13,556	11,094	2,343	80	39	-
Bijeljina, grad	12,389	2,855	7,035	1,664	474	361
Brodac	7,207	7,061	9	123	13	1
Dragaljevac	14,304	14,033	146	88	1	-
Janja	8,609	4,423	4,103	56	22	5
Koraj	4,227	1,656	2,560	11	-	-
Petrovo Polje	1,487	5	1	48	1,400	33
Tavna	5,447	4,823	613	10	1	613
Zabrđe	8,267	8,020	38	184	24	1
Total	78,602	57,038	16,744	2,344	2,074	402
District Brčko
Bosanski Šamac	3,412	577	1,261	1,536	31	-
Brezovo Polje	6,994	5,599	1,032	323	4	36
Brčko	7,780	1,856	4,034	1,689	57	144
Bukvik	11,419	2,873	27	8,508	1	10
Crkvina	5,792	3,378	7	2,407	4	36
Čelić	11,624	4,709	5,946	969	57	-
Domaljevac	5,743	1,583	6	4,154	-	-
Donja Mahala	11,714	163	6	11,545	-	-
Gornji Rahić	11,749	1,117	6,973	3,629	23	7
Gornji Žabar	4,373	3,778	1	577	12	5
Obudovac	8,200	6,405	19	1,772	4	-
Orašje	1,257	77	1,109	70	1	-
Slatina	3,946	2,473	3	1,464	6	
Tramošnjica	3,959	368	19	3,565	-	7
Total	97,962	34,956	20,443	42,208	109	246
