= Spanish ship Invencible (1739) =

Spanish 70-gun ship of the line

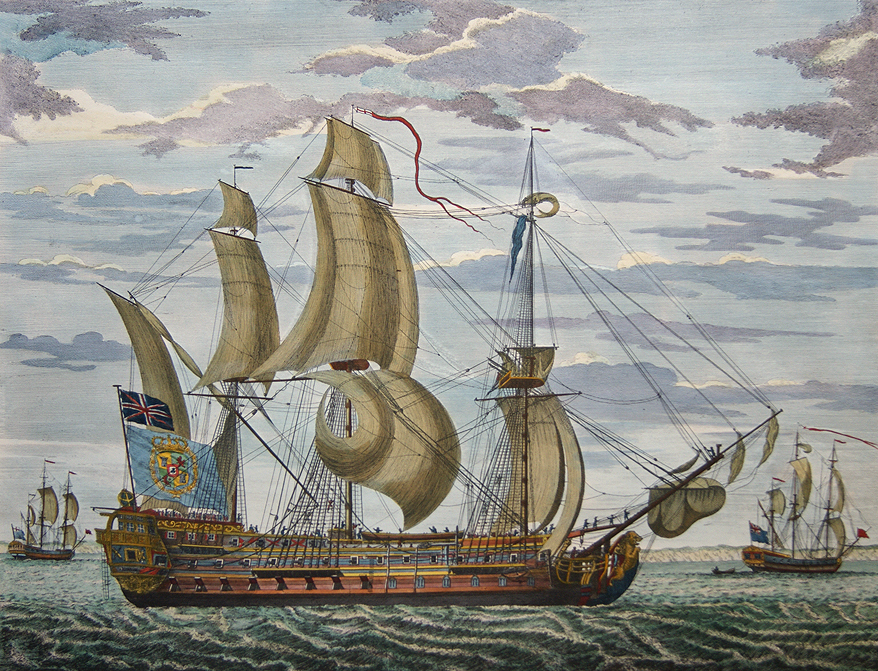
- Invencible's sister ship Glorioso

History

Spain
- Name: Invencible; San Ignacio de Loyola (religious alias)
- Ordered: January 1738
- Builder: Royal Shipyard of Havana
- Laid down: October 1738
- Launched: 4 November 1739
- Completed: Late 1740
- Fate: Exploded 30 June 1741

General characteristics
- Class & type: Invencible-class ship of the line
- Tons burthen: 1,6911/2
- Length: 176 ft (53.6 m) (gundeck); 147 ft (44.8 m) (keel
- Beam: 50 ft 6 in (15.4 m)
- Depth of hold: 23 ft (7 m)
- Propulsion: Sails
- Armament: LD: 28 × 24-pounder guns; UD: 30 × 18-pounder guns; QD & Fc : 12 × 8-pounder guns

Invencible was a 70-gun ship of the line of the Spanish Navy. Launched in 1739, she was one of the first 70-gun ships to be built by the Royal Shipyard of Havana. From late 1740 the ship was under the command of Lieutenant-general Rodrigo de Torres, based in the Caribbean as part of his Havana Squadron tasked with defending the Spanish colonies there. Invencible was used to escort convoys from Veracruz to Havana, and to take treasure from Mexico to Spain.

On 30 June 1741 the ship was at anchor off Havana, preparing to sail with Torres's squadron to Spain with a cargo of gold and silver. At 3 p.m. the ship was struck by lightning. This caused a fire which spread down to the deck, reaching the magazine which exploded at 4:15 p.m., the crew having already abandoned ship. Invencible was destroyed in the explosion, with debris landing in Havana and causing 50,000 people to flee into the countryside. The loss of Invencible and damage to the other ships of his squadron meant that Torres was unable to contest the British invasion of Cuba that August.

== Design ==
Invencible was a Spanish 70-gun Invencible-class ship of the line. The Spanish 70-gun ship was formally classified by the naval officer José Antonio de Gaztañeta in 1720 as ships of the line with two gundecks; denoted as 70-gun ships, in reality the type varied from sixty-eight to seventy-four. They were to carry twenty-six 24-pounder guns on the lower deck with twenty-eight 18-pounder guns on the upper deck. These two gundecks were to be accompanied by fourteen 8-pounder guns on the quarterdeck and a further two on the forecastle.

Gaztañeta introduced this new specification of 70-gun ship to, alongside larger 80-gun ships, replace the Spanish reliance on smaller 60-gun ships of the line, which were outsized by British and French ships, but still allow Spain to govern and communicate with Spanish America. Gaztañeta's designs were updated in 1737 to ensure that the Spanish ships remained as capable as the British and French. This included lengthening the ships, resulting in the standard 70-gun ship having two extra guns on each gundeck, while guns on the quarterdeck were reduced to ten and on the forecastle to two. The key difference between the Gaztañeta ships and foreign vessels was that the Spanish generally used a lighter calibre of gun and ensured a high level above the waterline so that the ships could operate in any weather. This, combined with an effort to lower weight through reduced ballast and superstructures, was introduced to ensure that Spanish ships could effectively travel to and operate in its colonies.

== Construction ==
The Invencible class was ordered by the Secretary of the Navy, Zenón de Somodevilla, 1st Marquess of Ensenada, in January 1738, to be built at the Royal Shipyard of Havana. It was designed by Ciprián Autrán and Pedro Boyer, and represented the first design to include the lengthening of the Gaztañeta classification, with an extra pair of gunports added to both gundecks, compared to the previous Galicia class. Two ships were ordered to the design, the first 70-gun ships to be built at Havana. They were named Invencible (Invincible) and Glorioso (Glorious). It was tradition for Spanish ships to be named after religious figures; when that was not the case, as with the Invencible class, they were given secondary advocaciones, or aliases. Invencible was therefore secondarily named San Ignacio de Loyola, after Ignatius of Loyola.

Invencible was laid down at Havana towards the middle of 1738, being under construction by the shipwright Pedro de Acosta in October. Wood for the ship was transported from Coatzacoalcos. The ship was launched on 4 November 1739 with the following dimensions: 176 feet (53.6 m) along the gundeck, 147 feet (44.8 m) at the keel, with a beam of 50 feet 6 inches (15.4 m) and a depth in the hold of 23 feet (7 m). The ship was calculated at 1,6911/2 tons burthen. Invencible was fitted out and completed in late 1740.

Illustrating the slightly enlarged nature of the class, Invencible was armed with twenty-eight 24-pounder guns on the lower deck and thirty 18-pounder guns on the upper deck; the smaller calibre armament was made up of twelve 8-pounder guns spread between the quarterdeck and forecastle. This had been decreased from the initial design which had planned for fourteen.

=== Characteristics ===
The structural strength of the Invencible class, and more broadly the Spanish 70-gun ship of the line, was proven by Invencible's sister ship Glorioso. In 1747 she undertook the voyage of the Glorioso, in which the ship first beat off the attack of two British fourth rates, the 60-gun HMS Warwick and 40-gun HMS Lark, then three British privateers, and finally fought the 40-gun fourth-rate HMS Dartmouth and 80-gun ship of the line HMS Russell. Glorioso destroyed the former before finally being captured by the latter after a five-hour battle.

== Service ==
Invencible was placed under the command of Lieutenant-general Rodrigo de Torres after her launch. Fighting the War of Jenkins' Ear, he had been given command of the Havana Squadron, with which he was to defend the Spanish possessions in the Caribbean, on 10 July 1740. After the ship's completion later that year, Torres sailed her to Veracruz, returning to Havana on 28 September with his squadron escorting a convoy. The force moved from its base at Cartagena to defend Havana in spring 1741, therefore missing the British attempt to capture the port in the Battle of Cartagena de Indias. The squadron instead worked to transfer income from Spanish Mexico to Spain, conveying it to Santander and returning to Havana before the British finished the unsuccessful battle in May.

Invencible continued serving under Torres as his flagship, escorting another convoy from Veracruz to Havana and returning to port there on 30 June. The ship was still in harbour that day, preparing to sail to Spain with the rest of Torres's squadron, when a storm hit at 3 p.m. while Torres and his officers were eating dinner. Lightning struck, hitting Invencible's mainmast and setting her sails on fire. The Spanish Navy had not yet implemented the use of lightning rods. As the sails burned, hot tar fell from the rigging. Invencible's crew attempted to use axes to cut away burning timber, but the strong wind spread the fire to the deck.

From the deck, flames reached Invencible's magazine, which held 400 quintals of gunpowder. Torres evacuated the ship, which by 4 p.m. was covered in a cloud of smoke. At 4:15 p.m. the magazine exploded, destroying Invencible and sending debris far into Havana, landing on the Castillo de la Real Fuerza and destroying the parish church.

The Governor of Cuba, Juan Francisco de Güemes y Horcasitas, reported:

"Torres was the last man to abandon ship...neither he nor the officers of his crew were able to save anything other than their lives and the clothes they were wearing".

Other ships in harbour were set alight by the explosion, while in Havana 50,000 citizens evacuated to the countryside in fear. Ten of the crew from Invencible were killed with a further twelve injured, and in Havana at least five people died.

Torres was able to save the rest of his squadron, which had manoeuvred away from the burning wreck, from the flames, but damage to the sails and rigging of his other ships of the line meant that he was unable to take more treasure to Spain as he had planned, or act against the upcoming British invasion of Cuba. The remnants of the squadron remained in Havana, focusing on protecting the city and making repairs, until after the invasion attempt had ended.

Invencible had a large cargo of gold and silver on board when she exploded. Salvage work was undertaken, but of the $1,000,000 cargo only about $20,000 was recovered. To avoid such a disaster occurring again, Torres and Güemes built isolated powder magazines on land at Havana to store excess gunpowder so that it did not have to be kept on board ships and in fortresses. A replacement 70-gun ship of the line, also named Invencible, was launched at Havana in 1743.
