= Havana Central railway station =

Railway station in Havana, Cuba

Havana Central La Habana Central
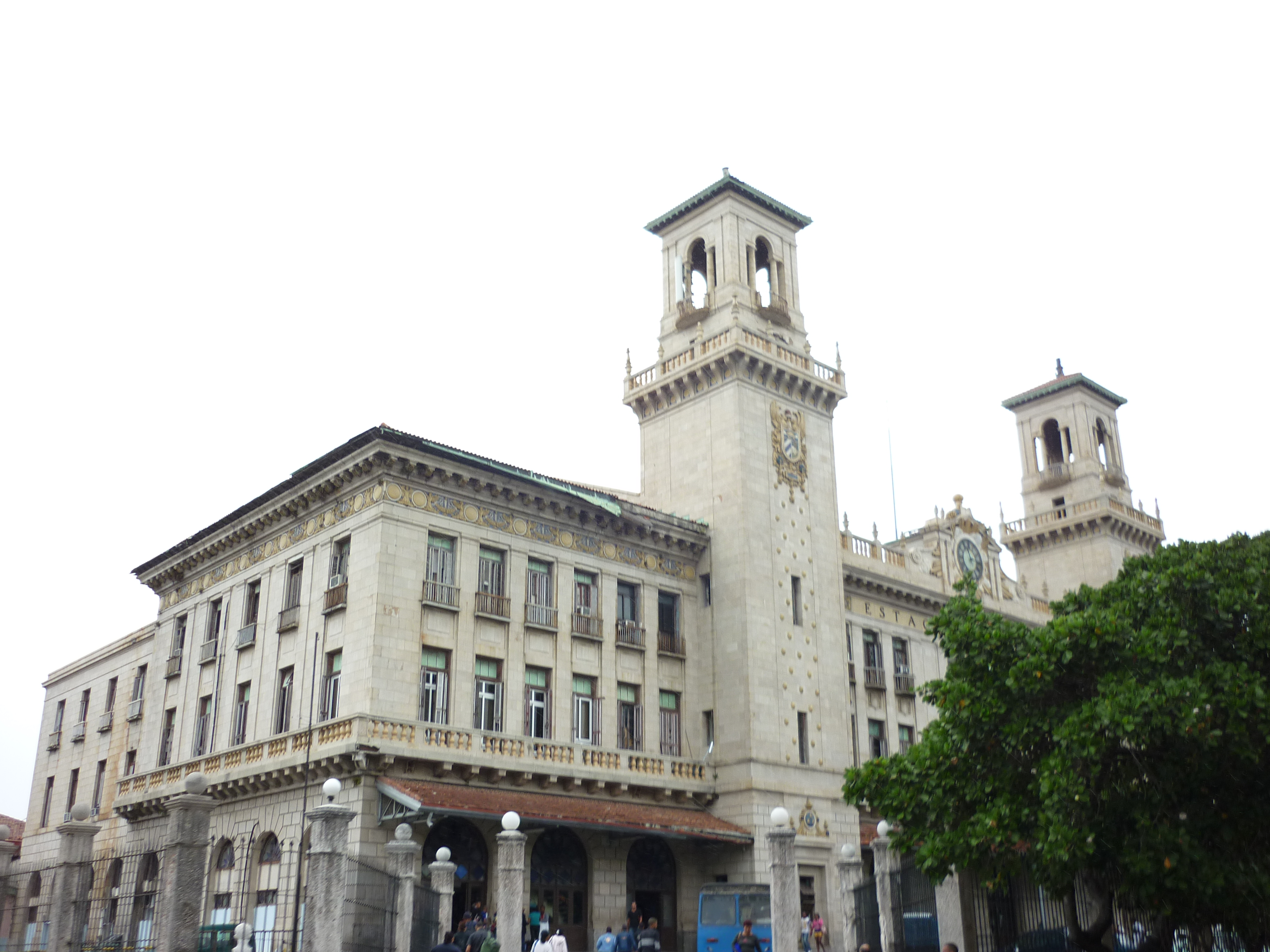
- Exterior facade of the station building

General information
- Location: 401 Avenida de Bélgica; Havana, Cuba
- Coordinates: 23.129673°N 82.355286°W
- System: Ferrocarriles de Cuba (Inter-city & Commuter)
- Owner: Revolutionary government
- Platforms: Below-grade
- Tracks: 10 (covered)
- Connections: Metrobus, Omnibús Metropolitanos (OM), ASTRO (Inter-city)

Construction
- Structure type: At-grade
- Platform levels: 4
- Parking: yes
- Cycle facilities: yes
- Accessible: yes

History
- Opened: 1912

Passengers
- 2009: ▼7.5 million
Location
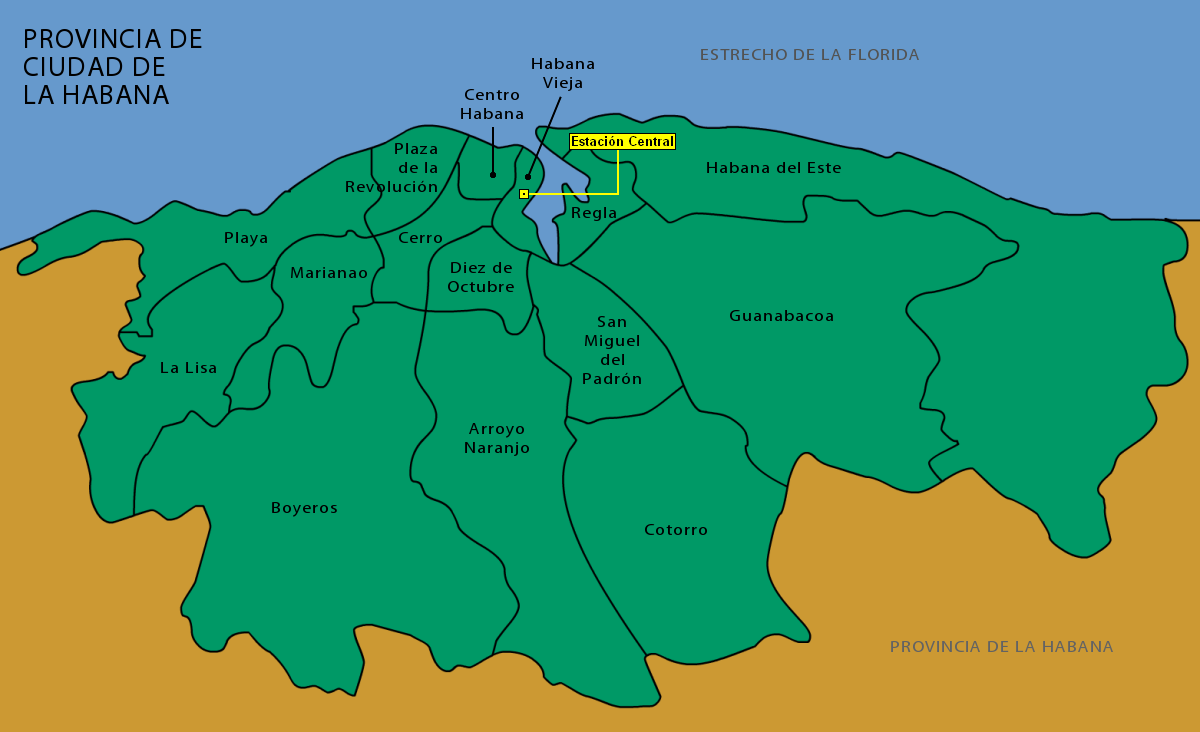

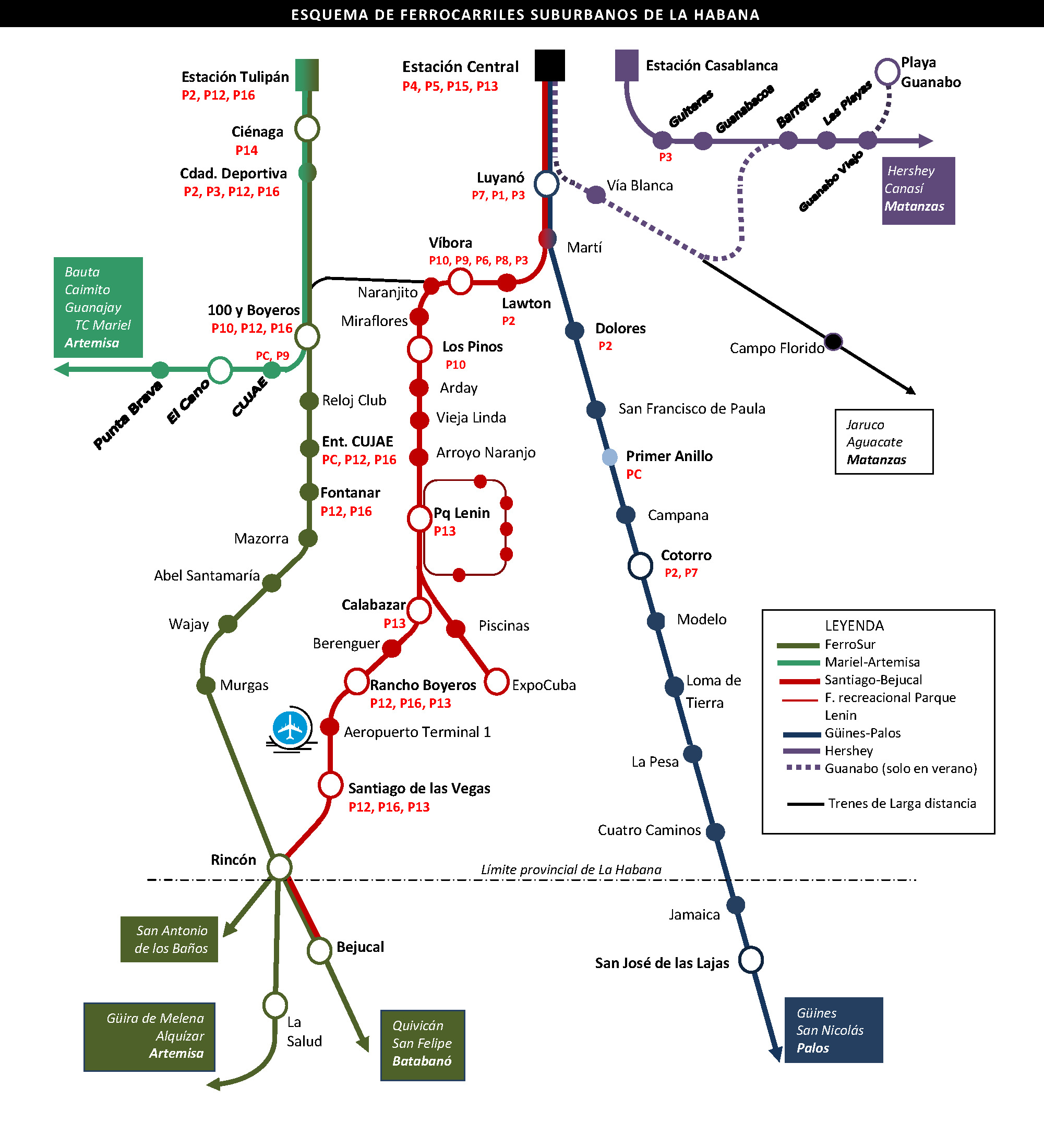
Map of the urban railway network of Havana

Havana Central (Spanish: La Habana Central; the "Central Railway Station", Estación Central de Ferrocarriles) is the main railway terminal in Havana and the largest railway station in Cuba. It serves as the hub of the rail system in the country. It handles the arrival and departure of national and divisional commuter trains, and is home to the national railway company, Ferrocarriles Nacionales de Cuba (FFCC), the only intercity passenger rail transport operating in the Caribbean.

The building is considered a national monument for its architectural and historical values and is, along with the stations of Santiago, Camagüey and Santa Clara, a network's divisional headquarter.

== Site ==
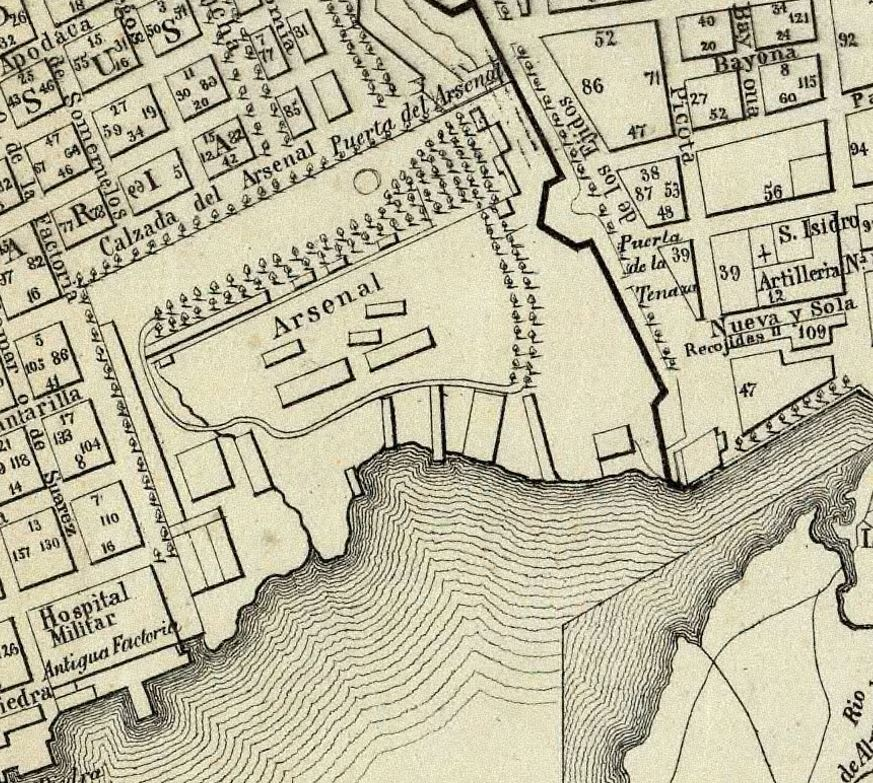
Royal Shipyard of Havana, crop from B. May Y Ca, 1853

The site of the railway station is located where the former Spanish Royal Shipyard of Havana was southeast of the Campo de Marte, and immediately outside the southernmost gate of the city.

== Design ==
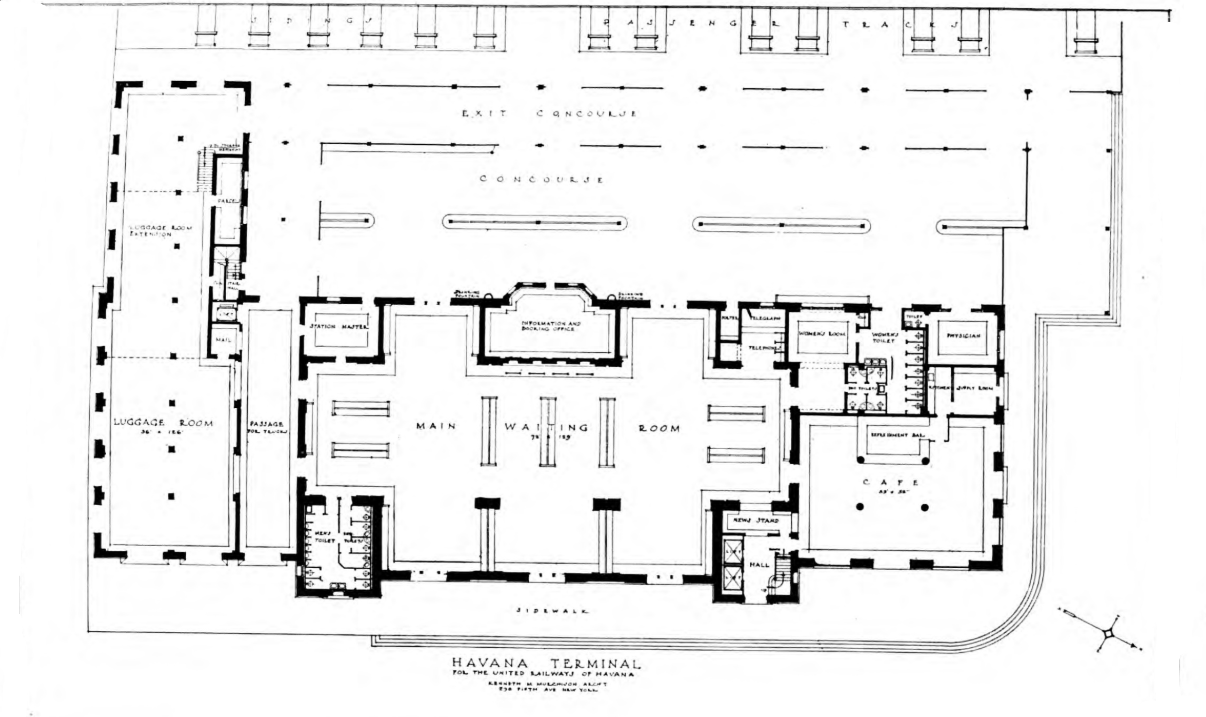
Havana central railway station floor plan

The eclectic architecture building has four floors and a mezzanine. On the main facade, there are two towers on Belgica Avenue representing the coat of arms of Cuba and Havana, respectively. The architect was Kenneth MacKenzie Murchison, who was inspired by the decorative style of Spanish Plateresque, which is visible in the elements of the decoration of the facade. The station's platforms are nearly one kilometer long and have a total area of 14,000 square meters.

== History ==
By 1910, the 71-year-old Villanueva Railway Station (currently the Capitolio grounds), the first of Havana, had exceeded its capacity due to increasing urban development and population of the city. On July 20, 1910, the Congress of Cuba authorized to build the new railway station on the'Arsenal public grounds instead of the Villanueva Station private grounds. The value of the old arsenal grounds and buildings was about US$3.7 million at the time, while the Villanueva grounds were about $2.3 million. This transaction caused heated debates within the political community and in general throughout the population of the city, because the value of Arsenal land was more than a million dollars to Villanueva, so it was unknown where that amount would go. This resulted in heated debates in the Congress. The Chamber representative Silverio Sánchez Figueras, commander of the liberation army, denounced the trade as a "dirty business", and the action was contradicted by congressman Colonel Severo Moleón Guerra. The confrontation culminated in a duel to death on December 9, 1910, where Congressman Moleón died. Two years later, on November 30, 1912, the new Central Railway Station was opened on the former Arsenal grounds.

In June 2015, the station closed for a three-year rebuild including additional platforms. All passenger traffic moved to the adjacent Coubre yard, where a former bus terminal was converted into a temporary station.

== Service ==
=== Overview ===
Central Railway Station has a network of suburban, interurban and long-distance rail lines. The railways are nationalised and run by the FFCC (Ferrocarriles de Cuba – Railways of Cuba). Rail service connects the Central Rail Station to various Cuban provinces. In 2009, the annual passenger volume was roughly 7.5 million, almost 400,000 less from the previous year, and 3.5 million less than 2004, mainly after the government upgraded ASTRO's long-distance inter-city buses fleet with brand new air conditioned Yutong buses. Santiago de Cuba is the busiest route from the Central Station, some 836 kilometres (519 mi) apart by rail. In 2000 the Union de Ferrocarriles de Cuba bought French first class air conditioned coaches.

Fast trains line 1 and 2, between (Central Station) and Santiago de Cuba, use comfortable stainless-steel air-conditioned coaches bought from French Railways and now known as the "Tren Francés" (the French train). It runs daily at peak periods of the year (Summer season, Christmas & Easter), and on every second day at other times of the year. These coaches were originally used on the premier Trans Europ Express service between Paris, Brussels and Amsterdam before being replaced with high speed Thalys trains. They were shipped to the Cuban Railways System in 2001. It offers two classes of seating, basic leatherette "especial" and quite luxurious "primera especial".

=== Route diagrams ===
Annual passengers transported 2004-09
	2004	2005	2006	2007	2008	2009
Total passengers	(?) 11.0 million	11.0 million	▼10.5 million	▼10.3 million	▼7.9 million	▼7.5 million

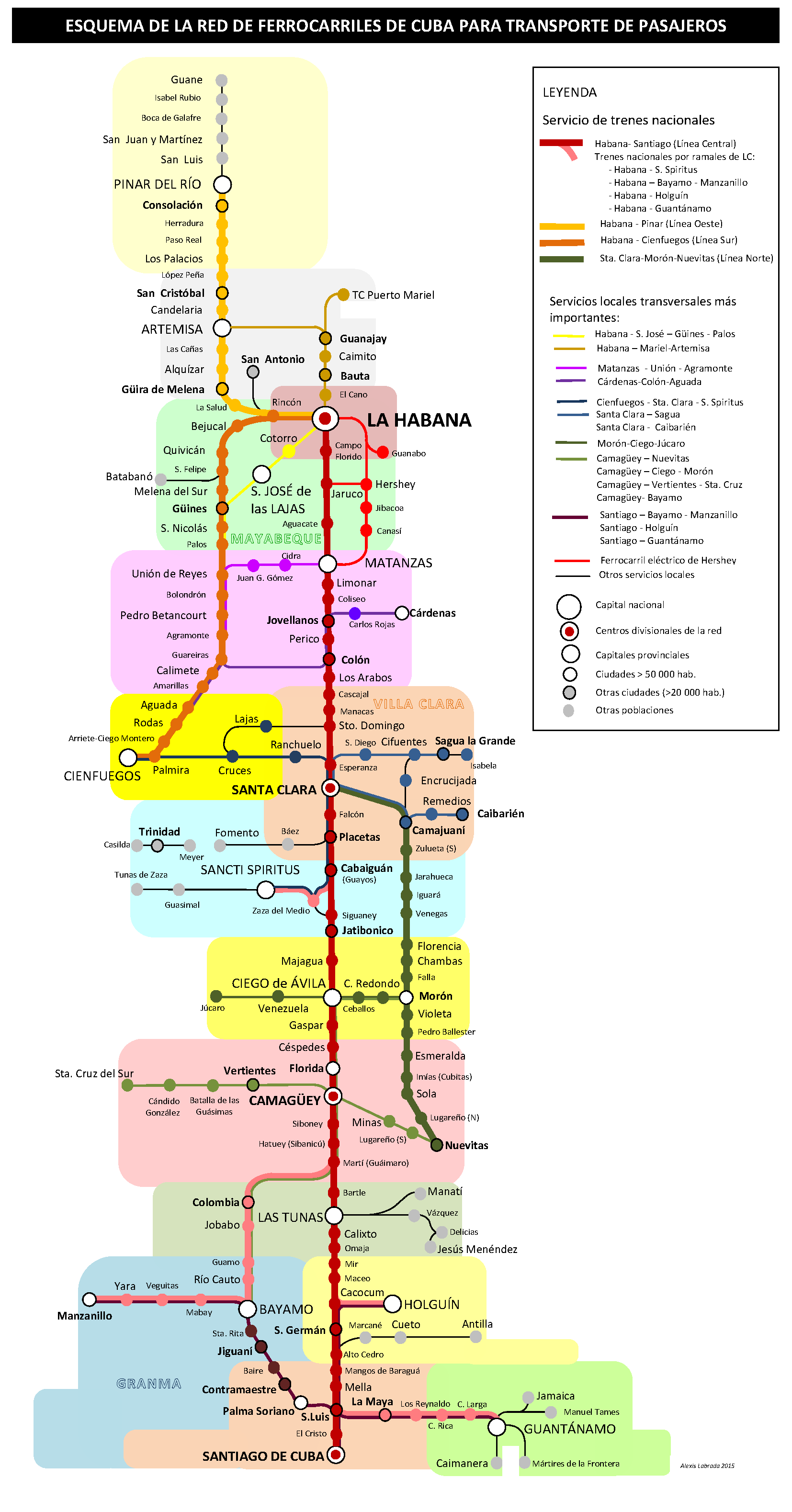
Cuban rail network for passenger transportation

Long-distance intercity rail lines
Train route #	Destination	Notes
1	Santiago de Cuba	The express flagship "Tren Francés" ("French Train").; Stops in Santa Clara and Camagüey.; Offers "first class" service with air-conditioning, and cafeteria car.
3	Ciego de Ávila	Final destination is the city of Morón
11	Santiago de Cuba	Stops in all major cities.; Services offered: buffet, air-conditioning, reclining seats, restrooms, and hostesses.
11/30	Guantánamo	via Santiago de Cuba
13	Bayamo	-
13/32	Manzanillo	via Bayamo
15	Holguín	Stops in all major cities. Not air-conditioned.; Services offered: restrooms, reclining seats, and hostesses.
17	Sancti Spíritus	-
19	Cienfuegos	Evening departure
21	Cienfuegos	Morning departure
23	Pinar del Río	-

== Gallery ==
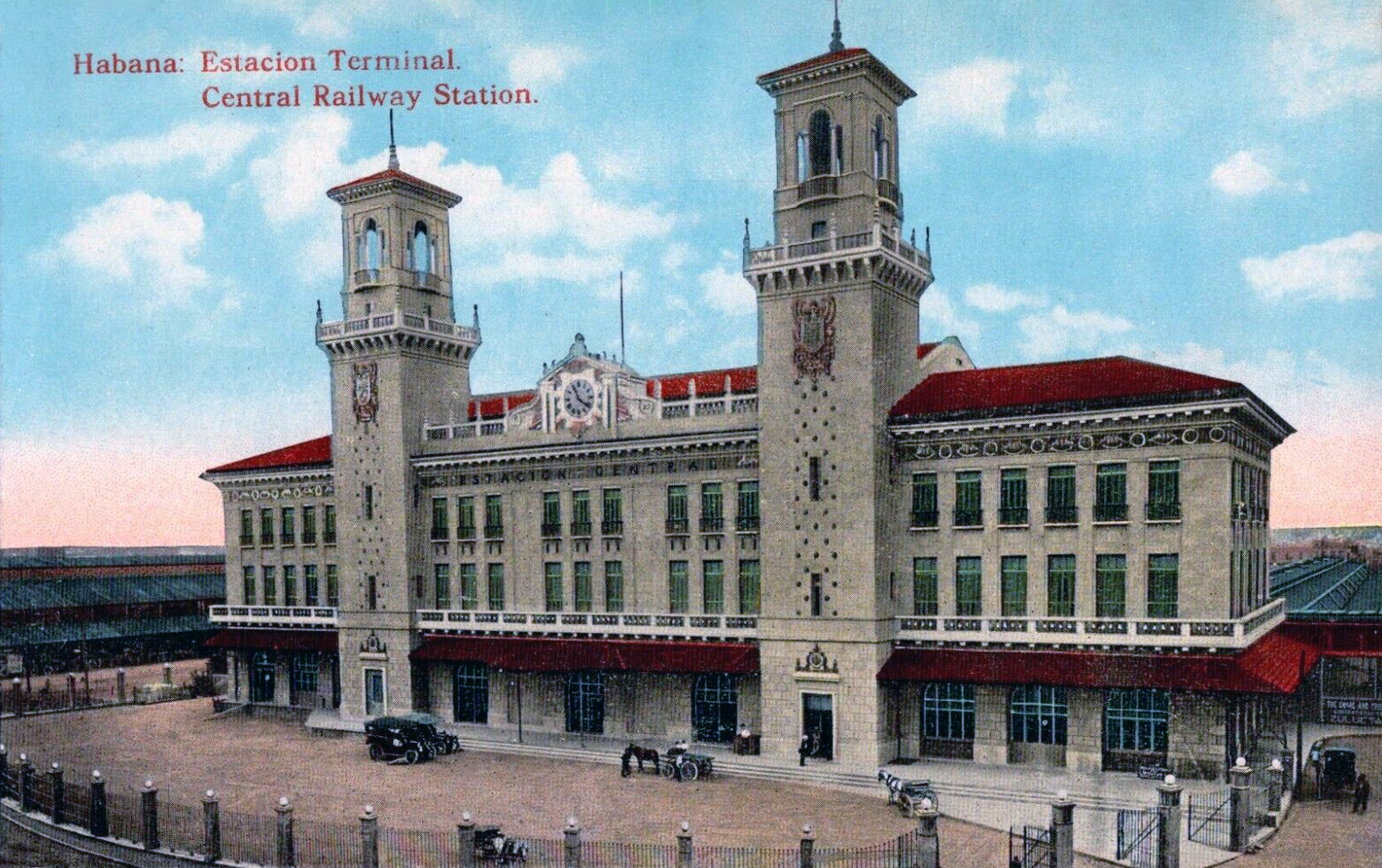
Station postcard of 1914

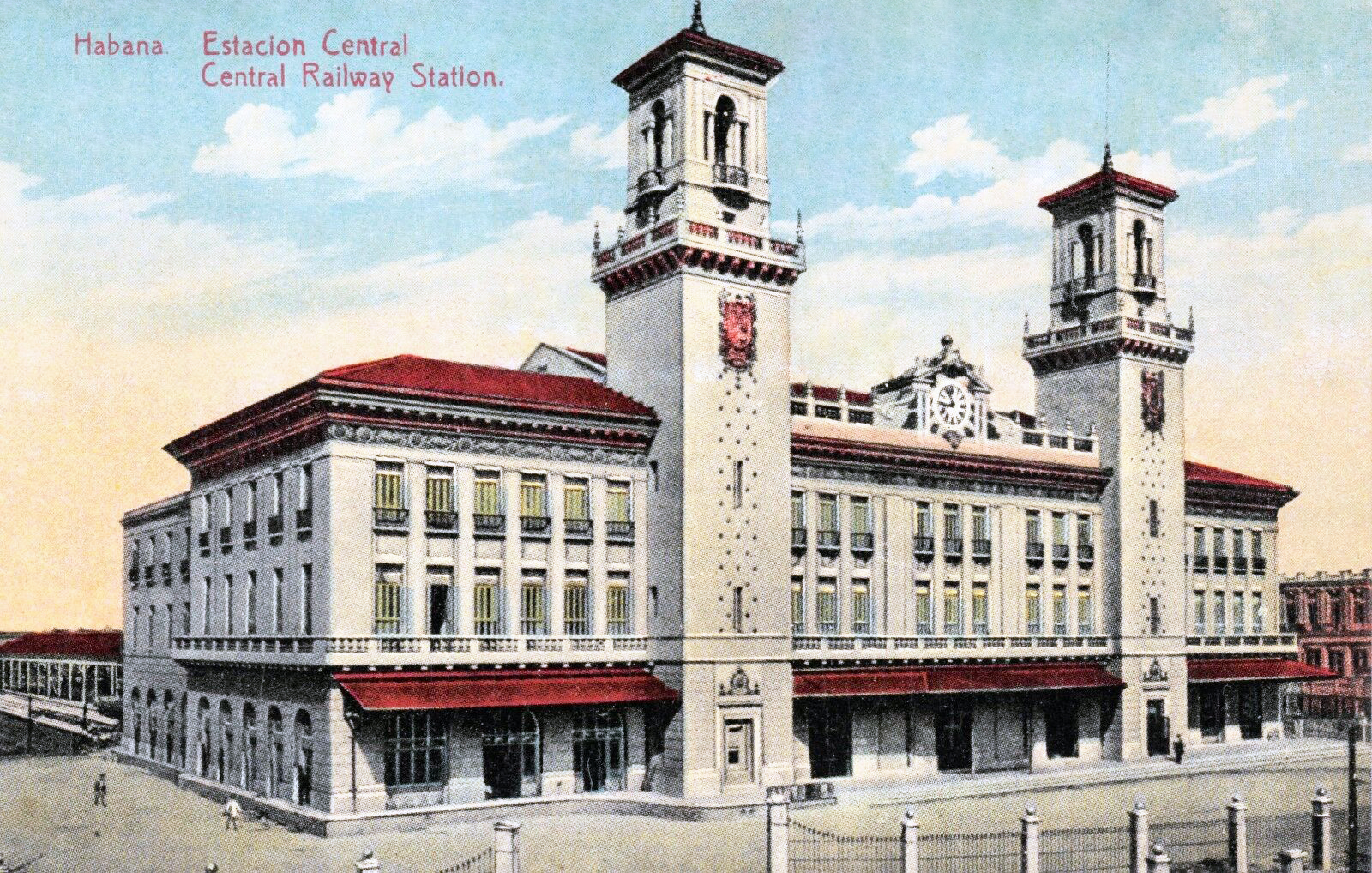
Station circa 1915

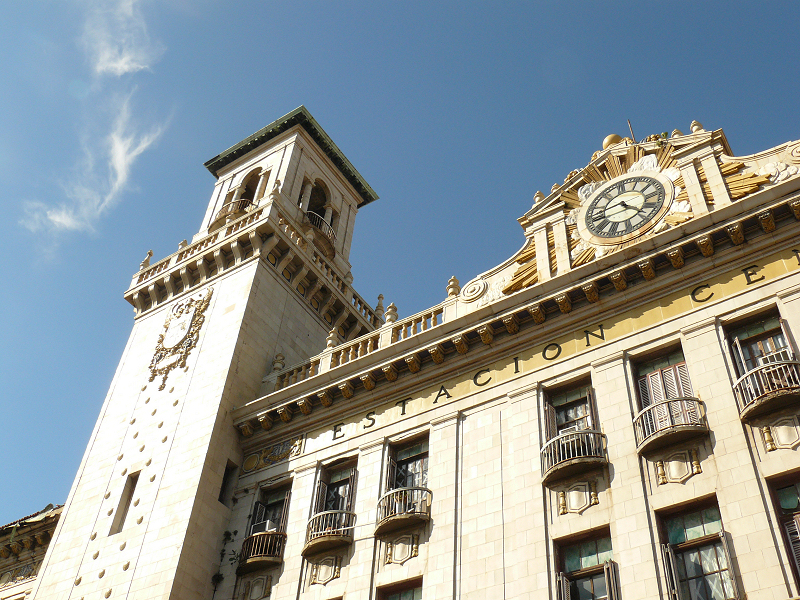
Detail of building's facade

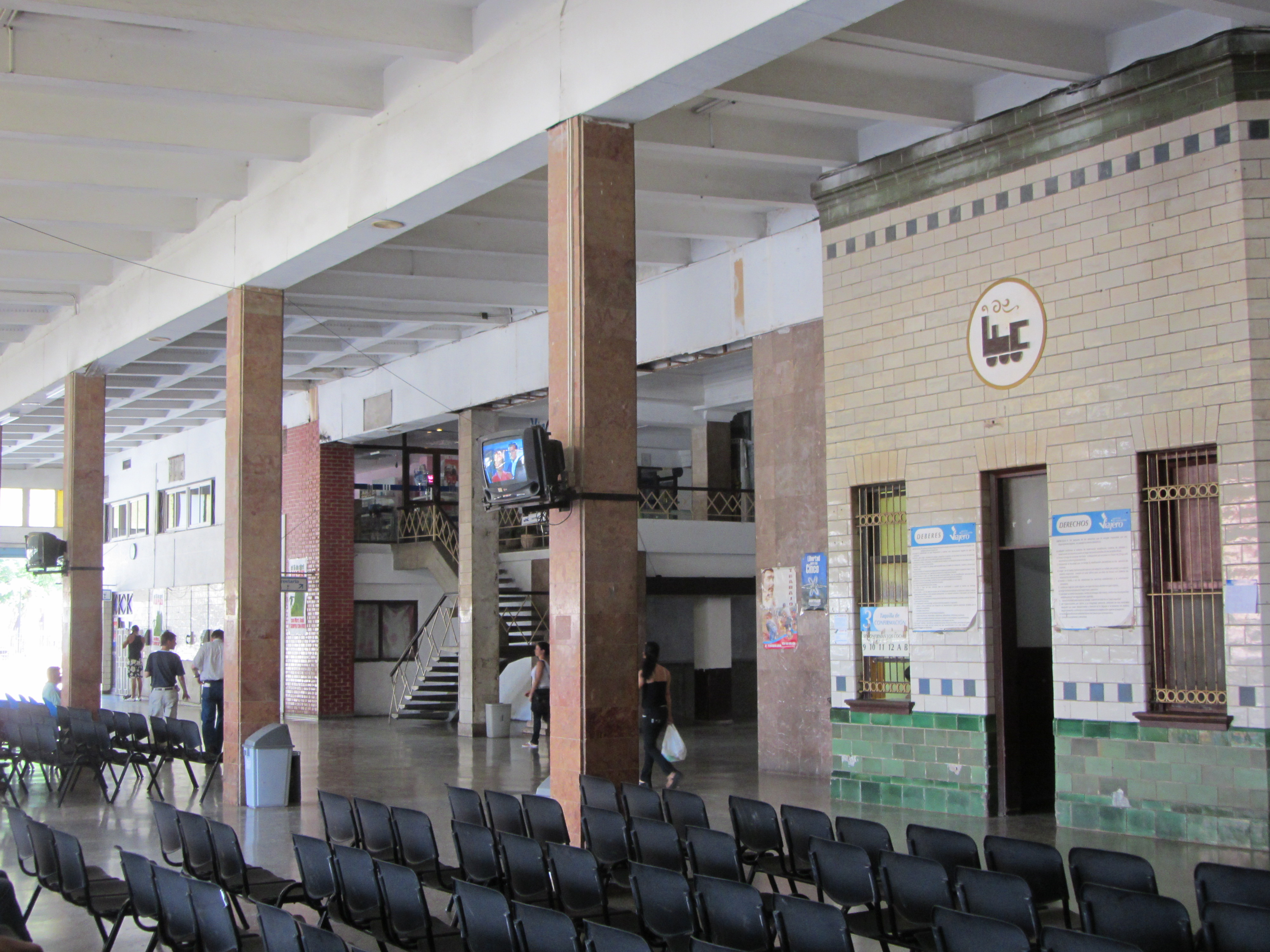
Station hall

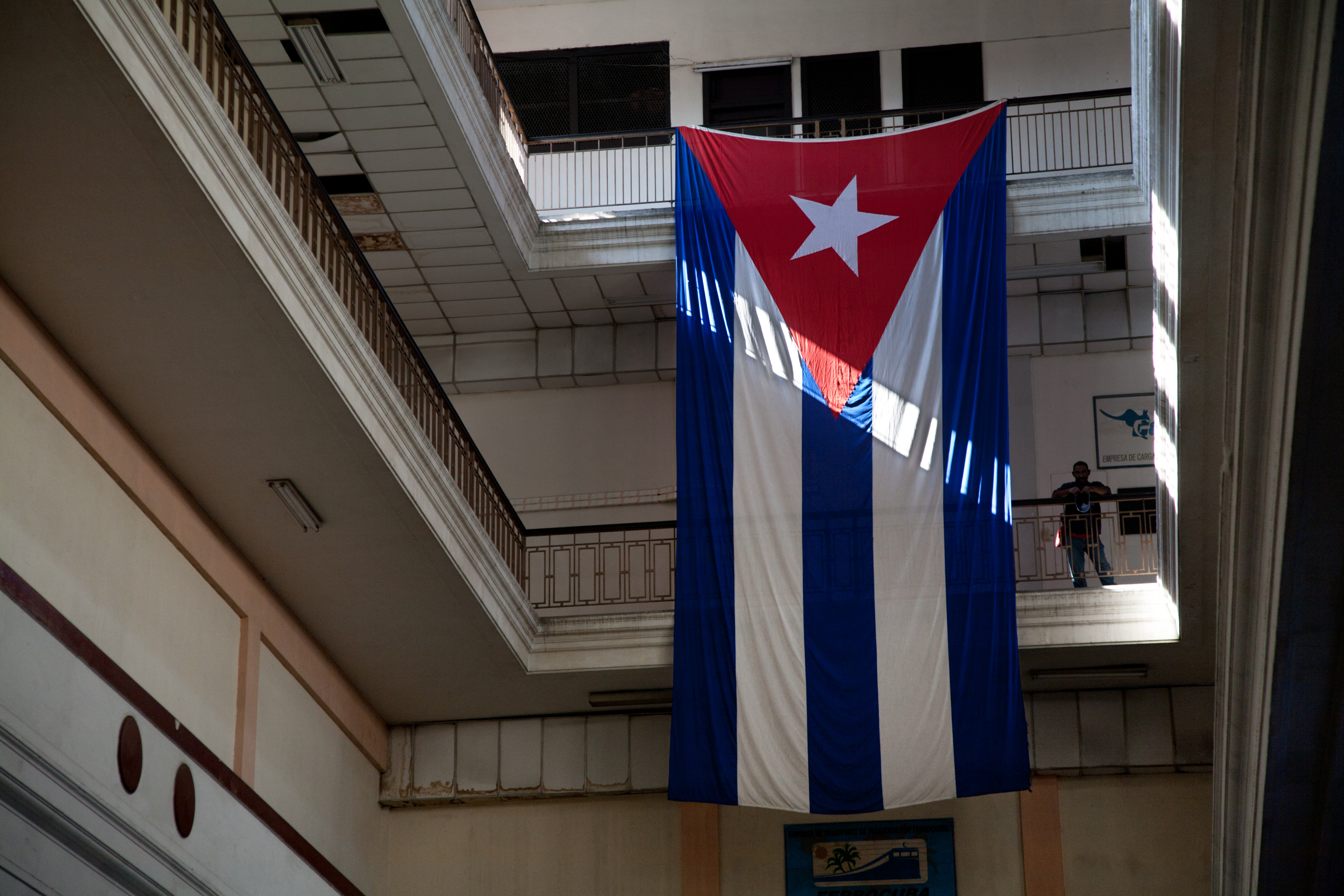
A Cuban flag hanging inside the station building

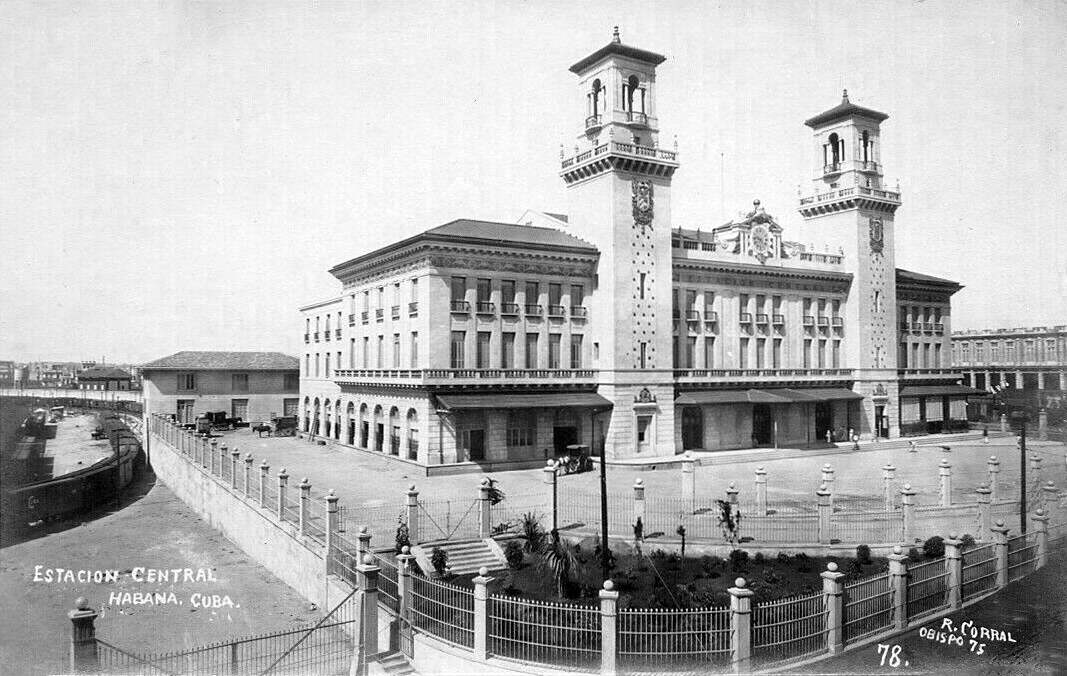

== See also ==
- Camagüey railway station
- Havana Suburban Railway
- National Railways of Cuba (FFCC)
- Santa Clara railway station
- Santiago de Cuba railway station
