= Santa Clara railway station (Cuba) =

Railway station in Santa Clara, Cuba

Santa Clara (Santa Clara Marta Abreu)
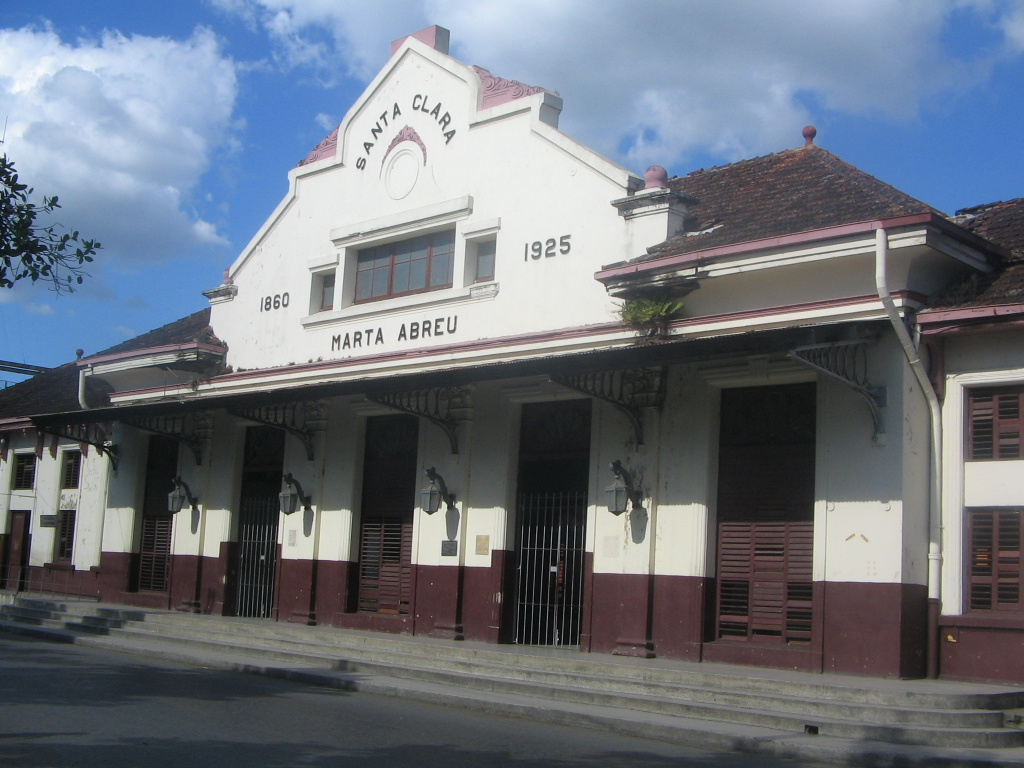
- Station building

General information
- Location: Parque de los Mártires, Av. Unión; Santa Clara, Cuba
- Coordinates: 22.41355°N 79.96598°W
- System: Ferrocarriles de Cuba
- Owner: National Government
- Lines: Havana-Santa Clara-Camagüey-Santiago; Santa Clara-Cienfuegos; Santa Clara-Isabela de Sagua; Santa Clara-Camajuaní-Nuevitas; Santa Clara to Placetas-Trinidad
- Platforms: 3 (at-grade)
- Tracks: 6

Construction
- Structure type: At-grade
- Platform levels: 1
- Parking: yes
- Accessible: yes

History
- Opened: 1860
Location

Santa Clara is the main railway station of the city of Santa Clara, seat of Villa Clara Province, Cuba. It is owned by the state company Ferrocarriles de Cuba (FFCC) and is located in front of Parque de los Mártires (Martyrs Park). It is one of the most important stations of Cuba and, along with Havana Central, Santiago and Camagüey, is a network's divisional headquarters.

== History ==
Opened in 1860 as part of the Cienfuegos-Villa Clara railroad and named Paradero Villa Clara (Villa Clara station). The first building, a large wooden structure, burned to the ground in 1895, at that moment, it was rebuilt by Marta Abreu (benefactress of the city) and the city council decided to rename that building after her. This second building, a Colonial architecture structure of brick walls and red tiled roof, was again remodeled in 1925, for the one still standing, keeping the name of Marta Abreu. Due to that reason the station is also known as Estación Marta Abreu (Santa Clara Marta Abreu).

== Structure ==
Santa Clara station has a large one-floor building in Spanish Colonial style. It counts 6 tracks, one of which is terminal (the nr. 6), and the nr. 5 is not served by any platform. Just after the level crossing is located the main shed, and another one is 100 m in the north, on the line to Camajuaní and the University. Close to the main depot and just side the line to Camagüey, is located the Tren Blindado (armoured train) memorial of the Battle of Santa Clara.

All the lines serving the station, included the main one (Havana-Camagüey-Santiago), are not electrified and have a single track. Only the route to Esperanza (10 km, toward Havana) has a double track, due to the usage of the second rail for the line to Cienfuegos.

== Services ==
The station is served by several long-distance trains linking almost the whole island as the flagship Tren Francés (French Train) Havana-Camagüey-Santiago. Other long-distance trains, principally departing/ending at Havana Central, link Santa Clara to Holguín, Guantánamo, Bayamo, Manzanillo, Matanzas, Ciego de Ávila, Las Tunas and other cities.

There are some inter-regional trains to Cienfuegos, Sancti Spíritus, Morón and Nuevitas, some regionals to Caibarién and Sagua la Grande, and a suburban train connecting "Santa Clara" to the other city station (Santa Clara Universidad, 22.43863°N 79.90157°W), serving the "Marta Abreu" University.

== Gallery ==
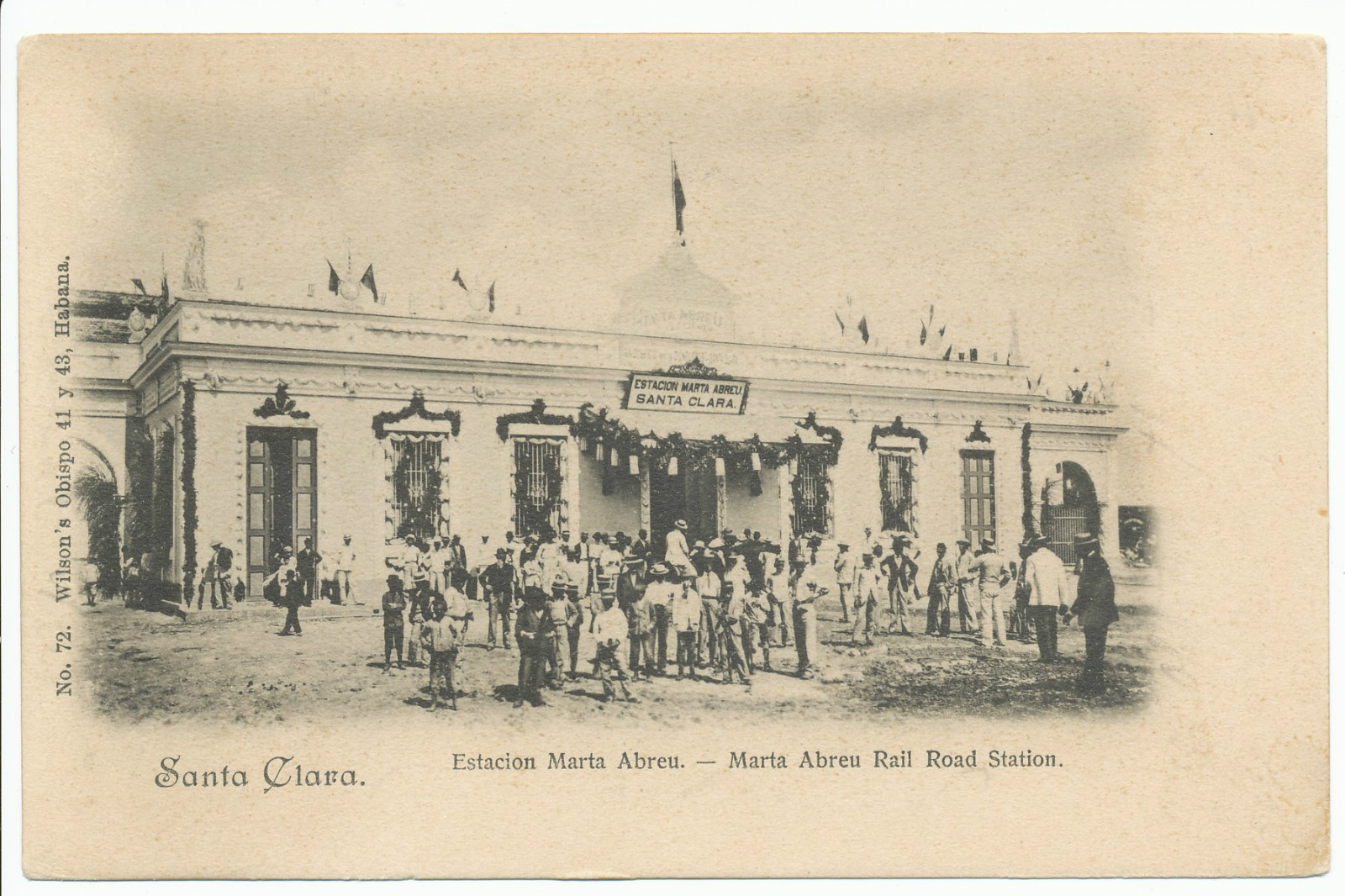
Black and white historic postcard of "Marta Abreu" station, circa 1900. People gathered outside the main gates.

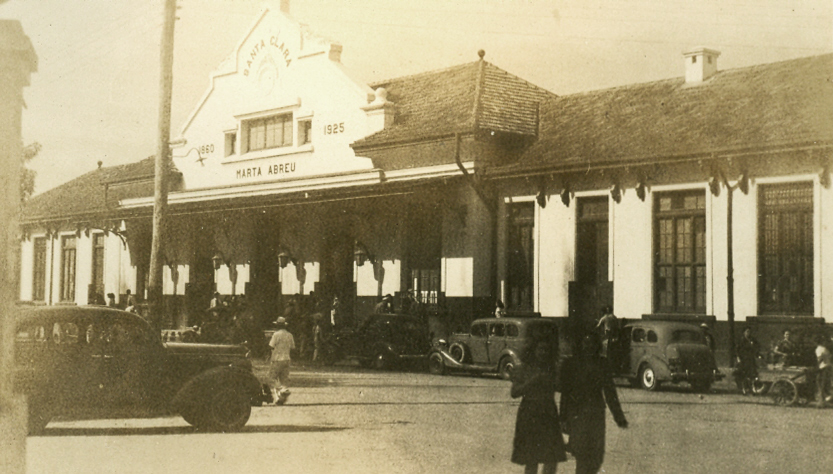
A 1930s photo of the station. Old American cars, people and fruit vendor gather outside the building.

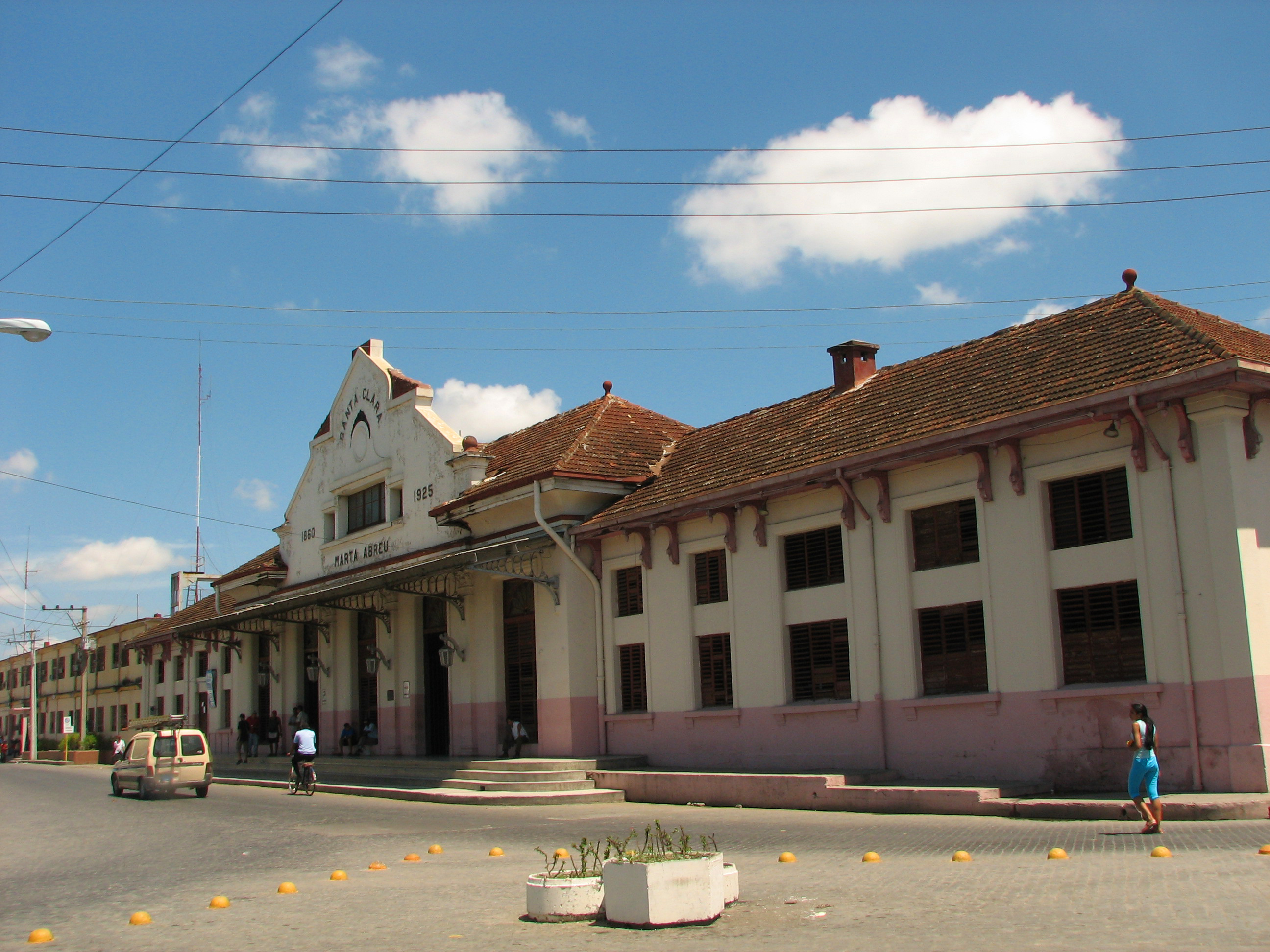
A view of the front exterior of the station, and the Ferrocarriles de Cuba (FFCC) central office building, in the back, as of 2007.

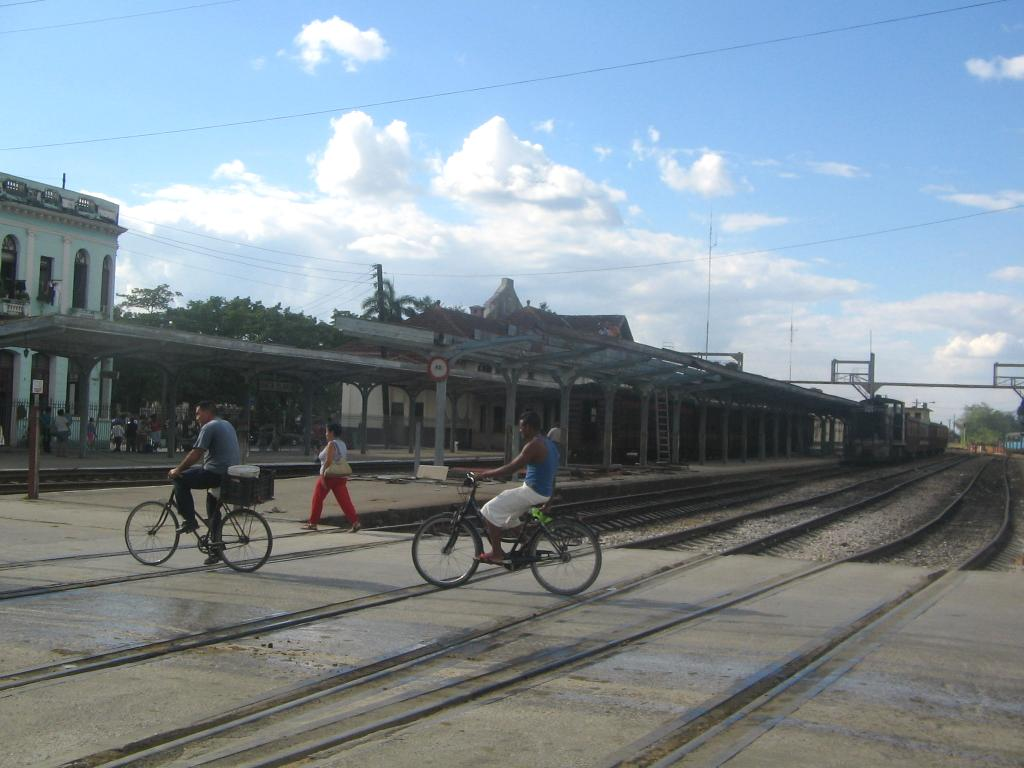
View of the station from the level crossing

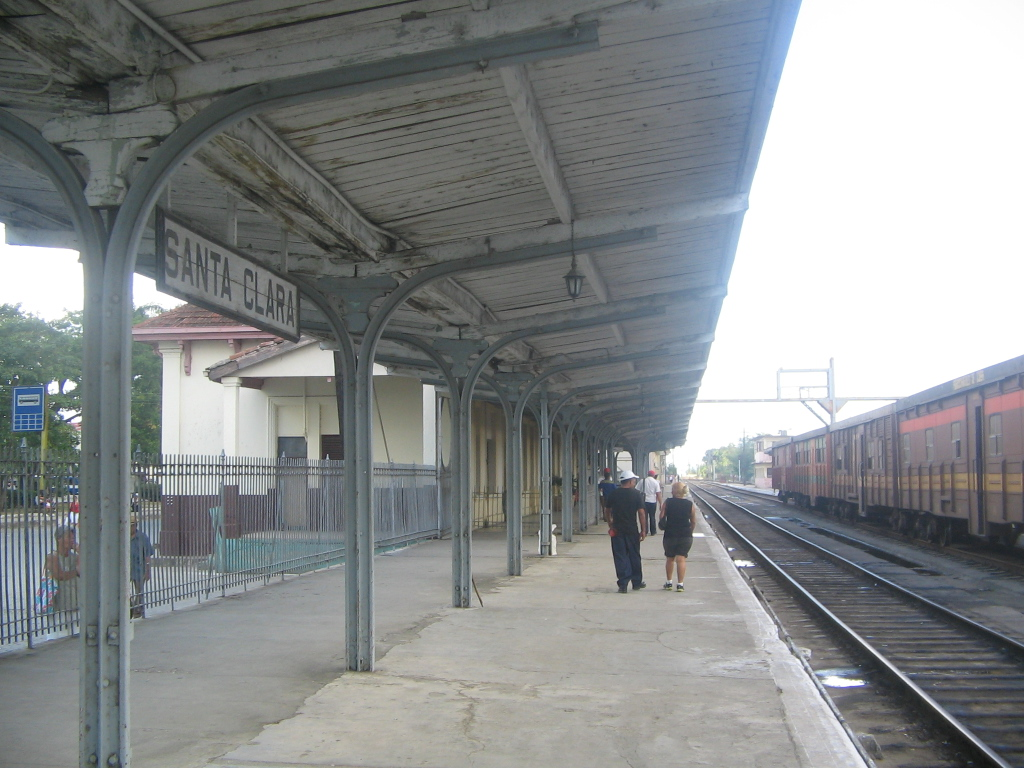
Platform 1 and building

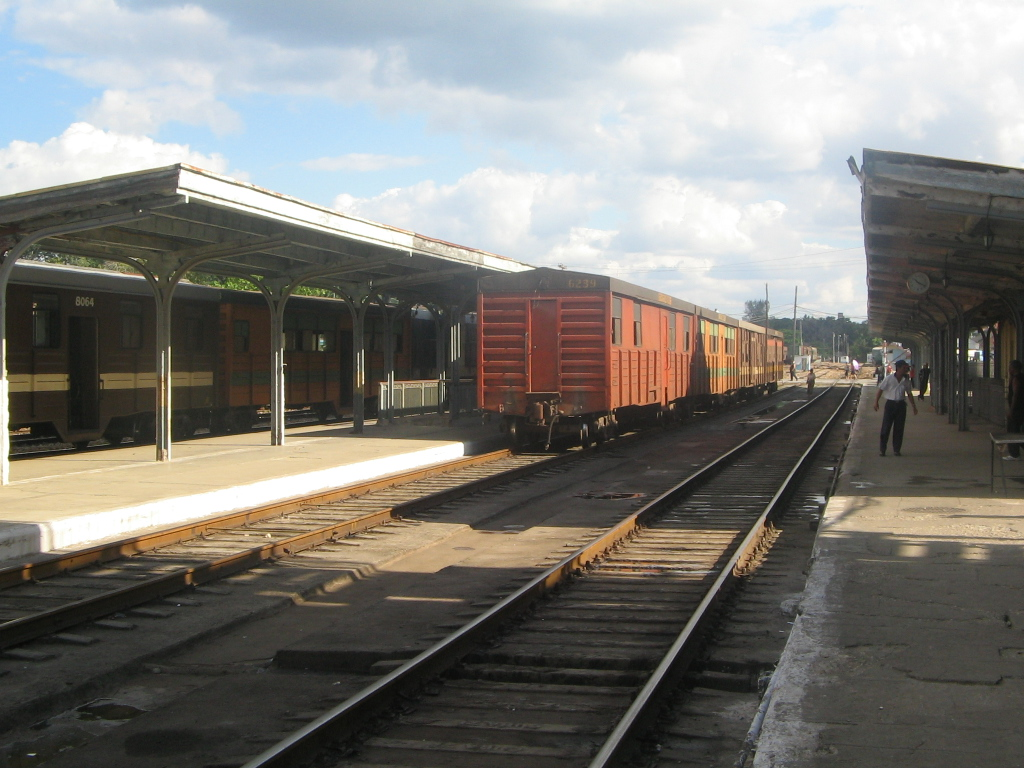
Platform 2/3 (in the left)

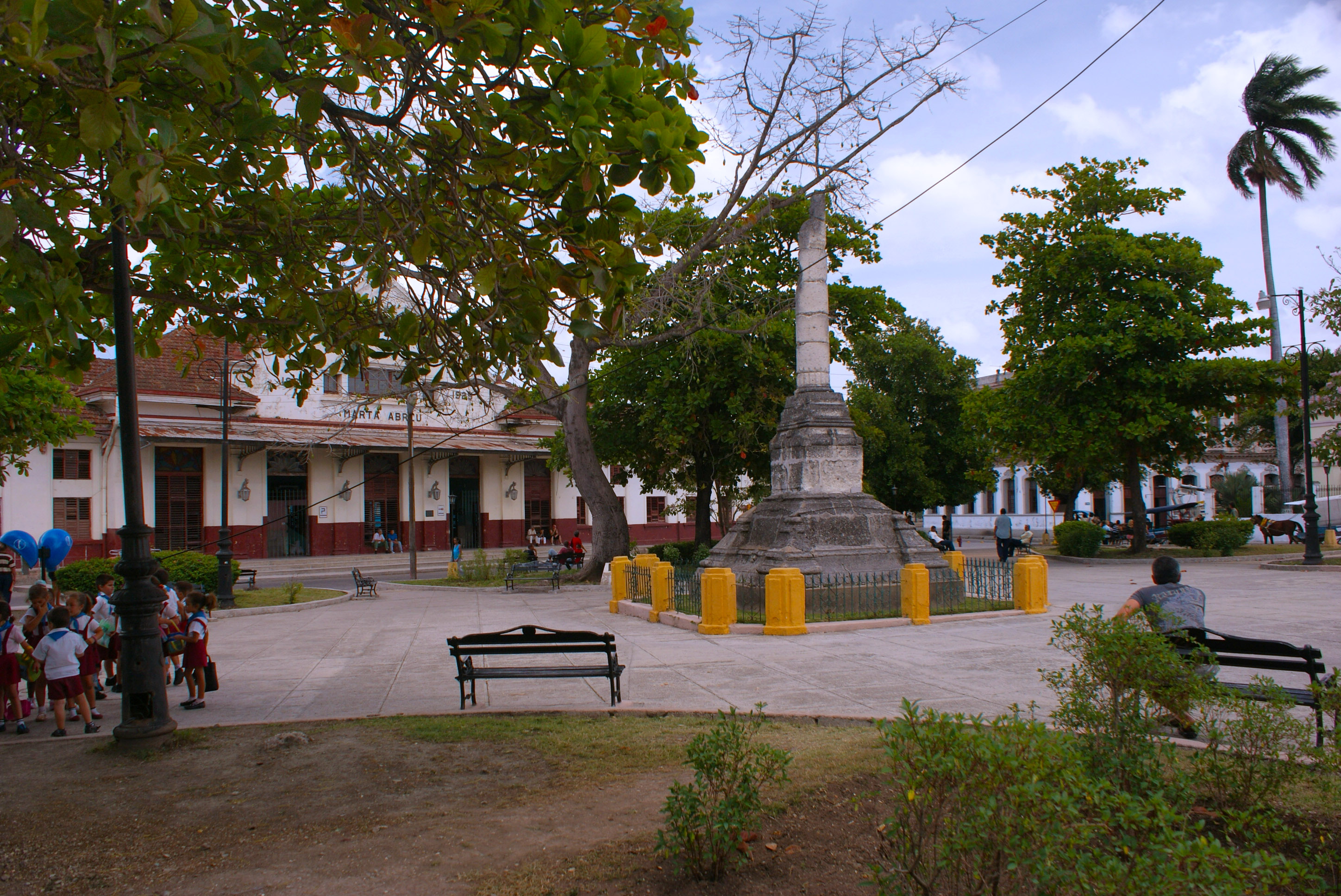
Marta Abreu station across Martyrs Park. At the center the truncated pillar monument dedicated to the martyrs of the Colonial Independence War. Photo from 2010

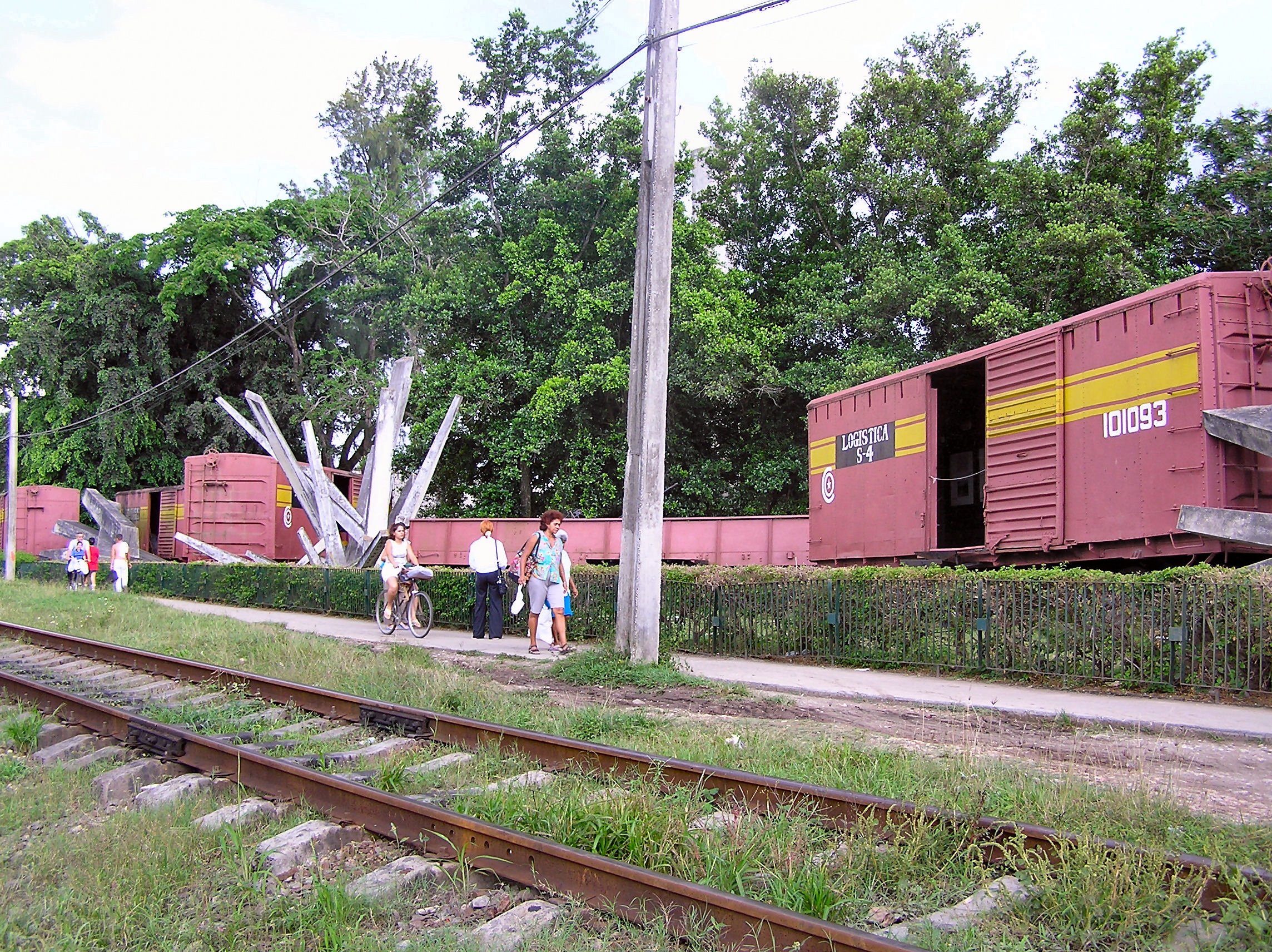
The Tren Blindado memorial

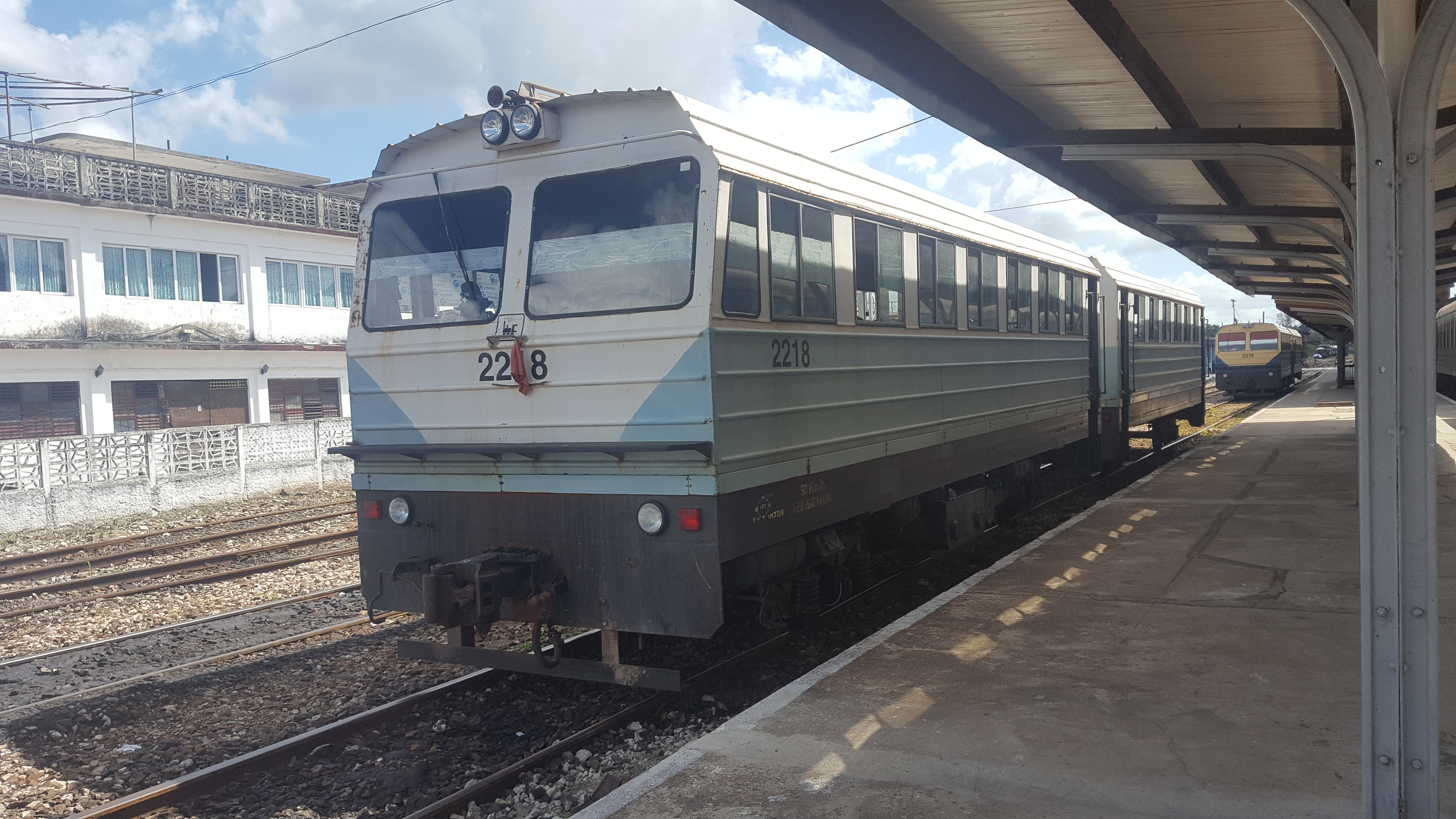
A SV10-2218 + VS5 railcar at the station's third platform

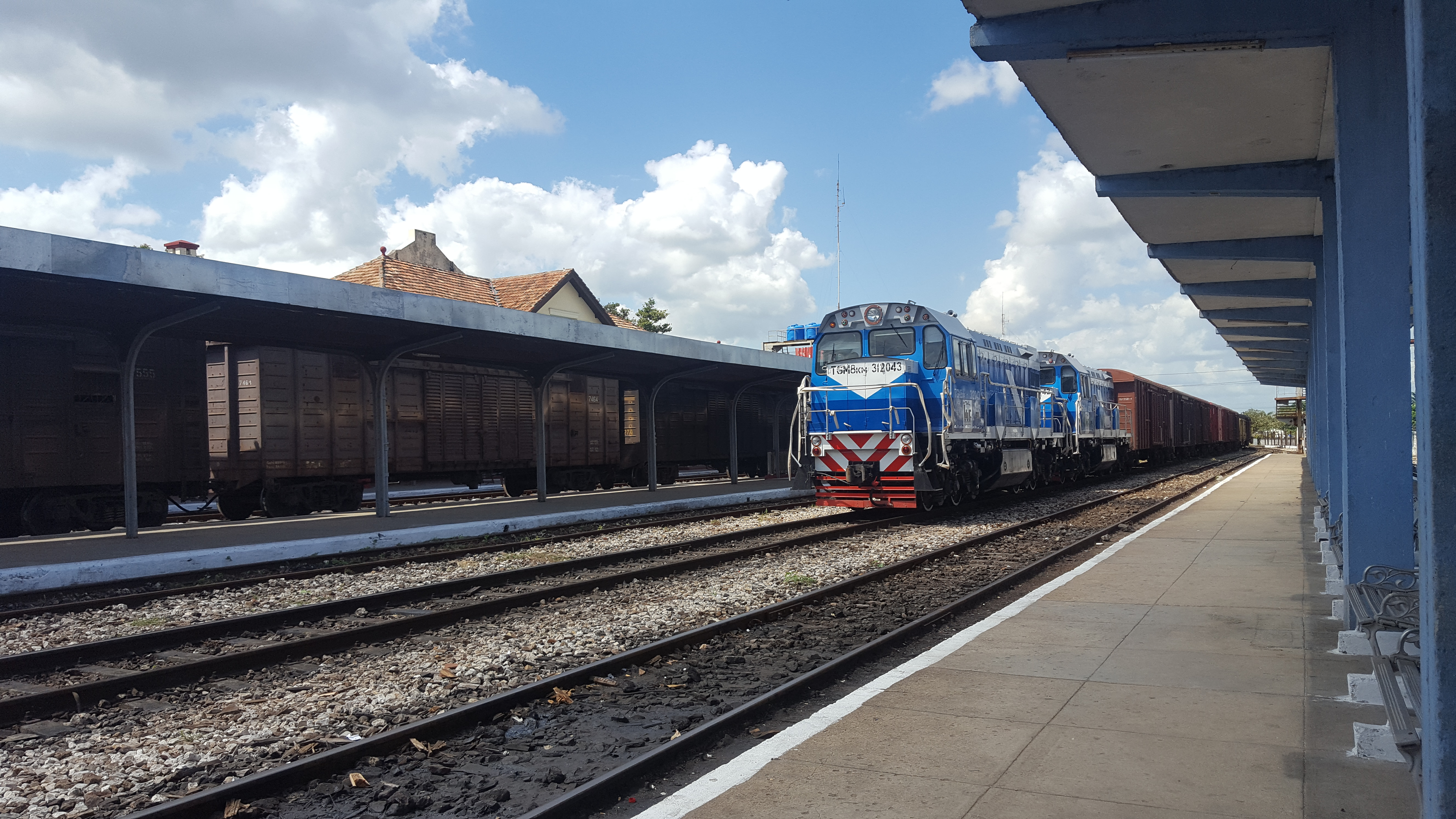
A freight train passing through the station, headed by two TGM8 locomotives

== See also ==
- Camagüey railway station
- Havana Central railway station
- Santiago de Cuba railway station
