= Santiago de Cuba railway station =

Railway station in Cuba

Santiago de Cuba (Santiago de Cuba General Senén Casas)
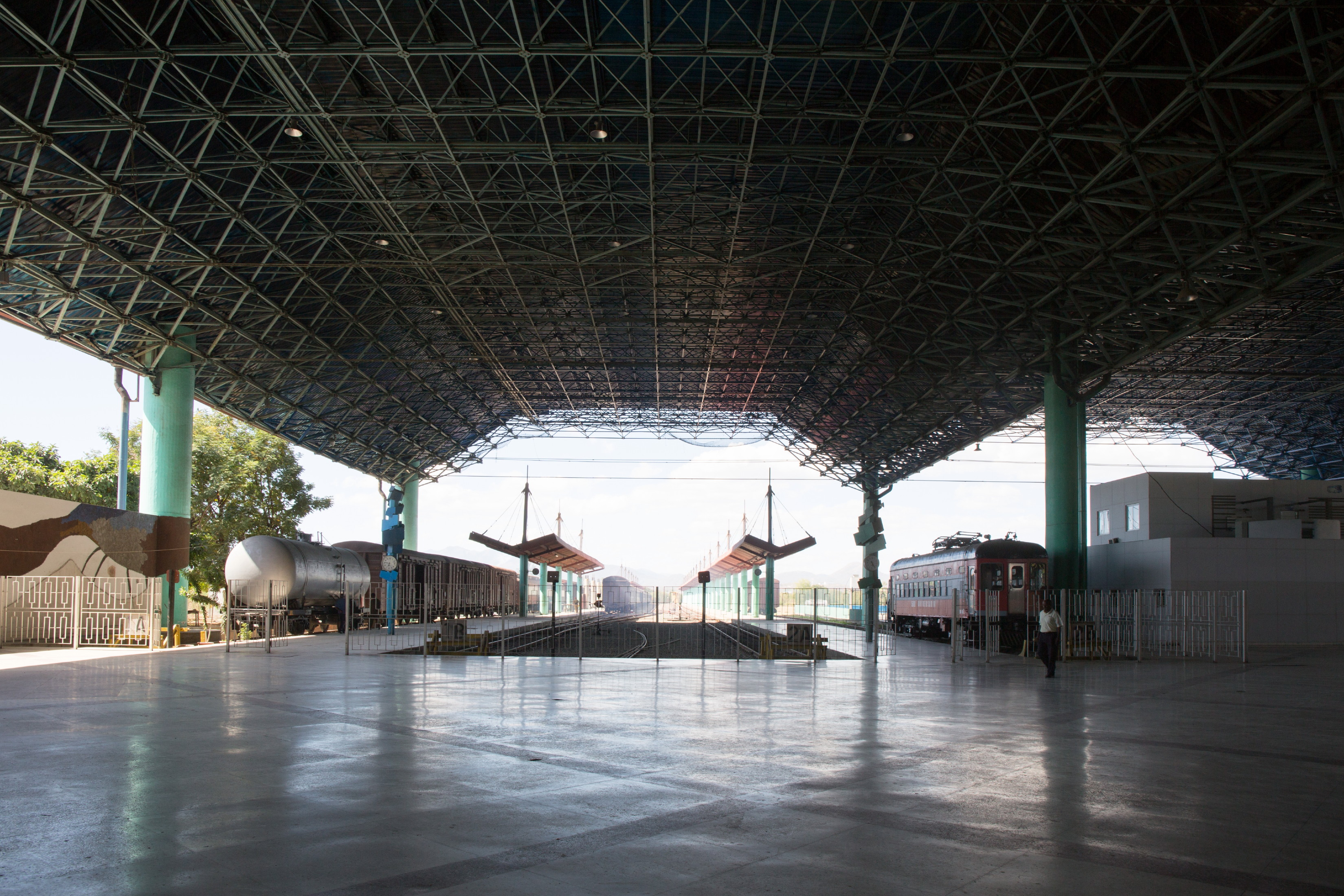
- View of the station platforms from the concourse

General information
- Location: Paseo de Martí and Av. Jesús Menéndez; Santiago de Cuba, Cuba
- Coordinates: 20.03093°N 75.83426°W
- System: Ferrocarriles de Cuba
- Owner: National Government
- Lines: Havana–Santa Clara–Camagüey–Santiago; Santiago–Guantánamo; Santiago–San Luis–Bayamo
- Platforms: 4 (at-grade)
- Tracks: 8

Construction
- Structure type: At-grade
- Platform levels: 1
- Parking: yes
- Accessible: yes

History
- Rebuilt: 1997
Location

Santiago de Cuba, also known as Santiago General Senén Casas, is the main railway station of the city of Santiago de Cuba, seat of the province of the same name in Cuba. It is owned by the state company Ferrocarriles de Cuba (FFCC) and is located in the central Paseo de Martí, near the city harbor.

It is the second–most important station in Cuba and, along with Havana Central, Camagüey and Santa Clara, is one of the network's divisional headquarters.

== History ==
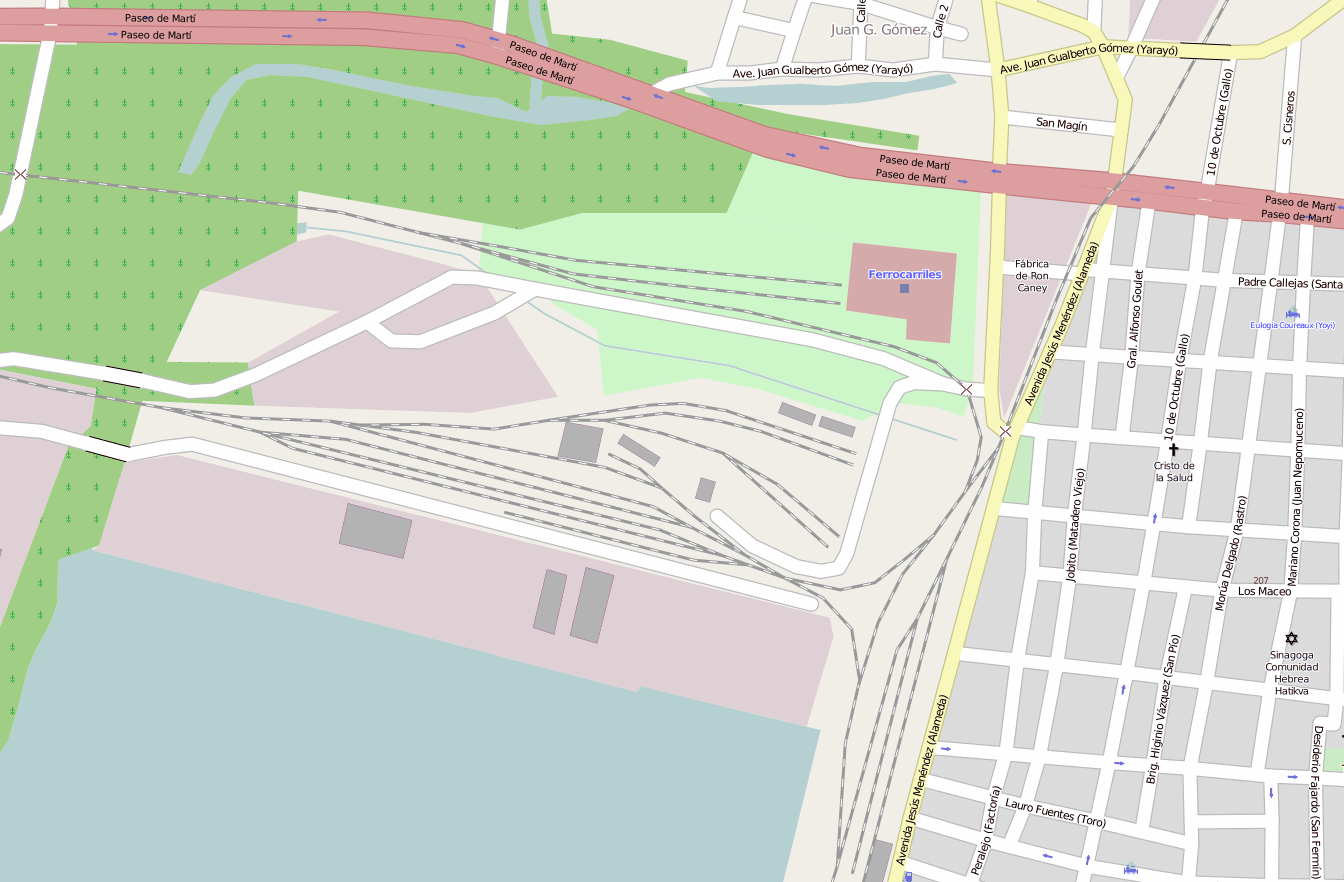
OSM map of the station and surrounding area, including the railway siding to the nearby harbor

The station, named after the Cuban politician Senén Casas Regueiro, was completely renewed and rebuilt in 1997. The old station, located near the harbor's custom office, is the terminal of the harbor's rail siding.

== Structure ==
Santiago station is a terminus composed of a large and modern building, covered with two vaults and with a modern clock tower in the adjacent garden. To the south, parallel to the station tracks, are located a large shed and siding that serve the harbor. A secondary shed is located in the Avenida Los Pions.

The station lies in Los Pinos ward (reparto) and the line, counting a double track, is not electrified. The double track route Santiago–San Luis is used also for trains linking Santiago to Bayamo and Guantánamo. A junction, departing from the nearby village of El Cristo and arriving at La Maya (on the line to Guantánamo), was only partially built.

== Services ==
The station is Cuba's main eastern rail terminus (Havana Central being the main western one). It is served by several long-distance trains linking almost the whole island, including the flagship Tren Francés (French Train) Havana–Santa Clara–Camagüey–Santiago. Other long-distance trains, principally commencing/terminating at Havana Central, link Santiago to Matanzas, Ciego de Ávila, Las Tunas and other cities. There are also some inter-regional and regional trains to Palma Soriano, Bayamo, Manzanillo, Guantánamo and Holguín.

== Gallery ==
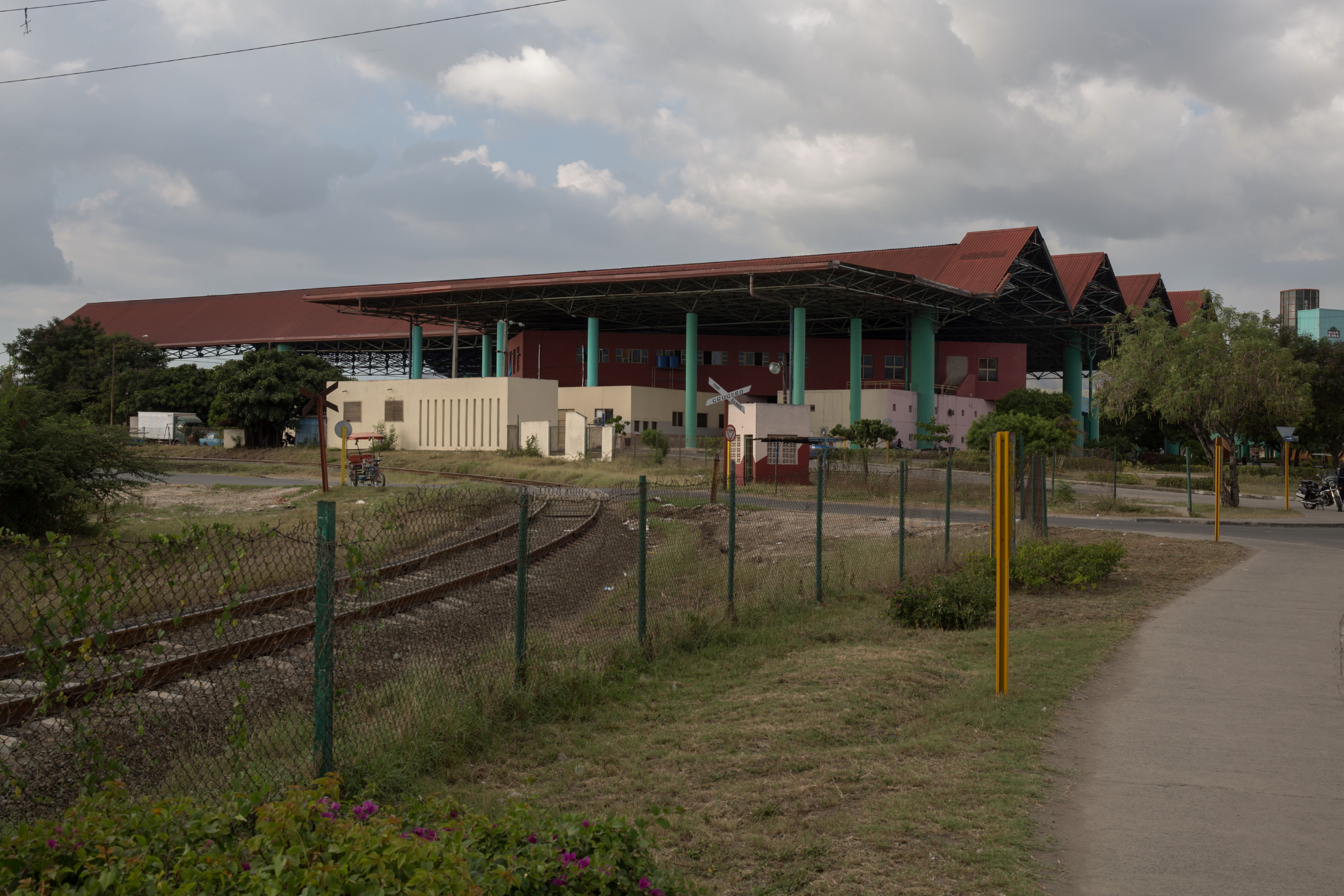
Side view of the building

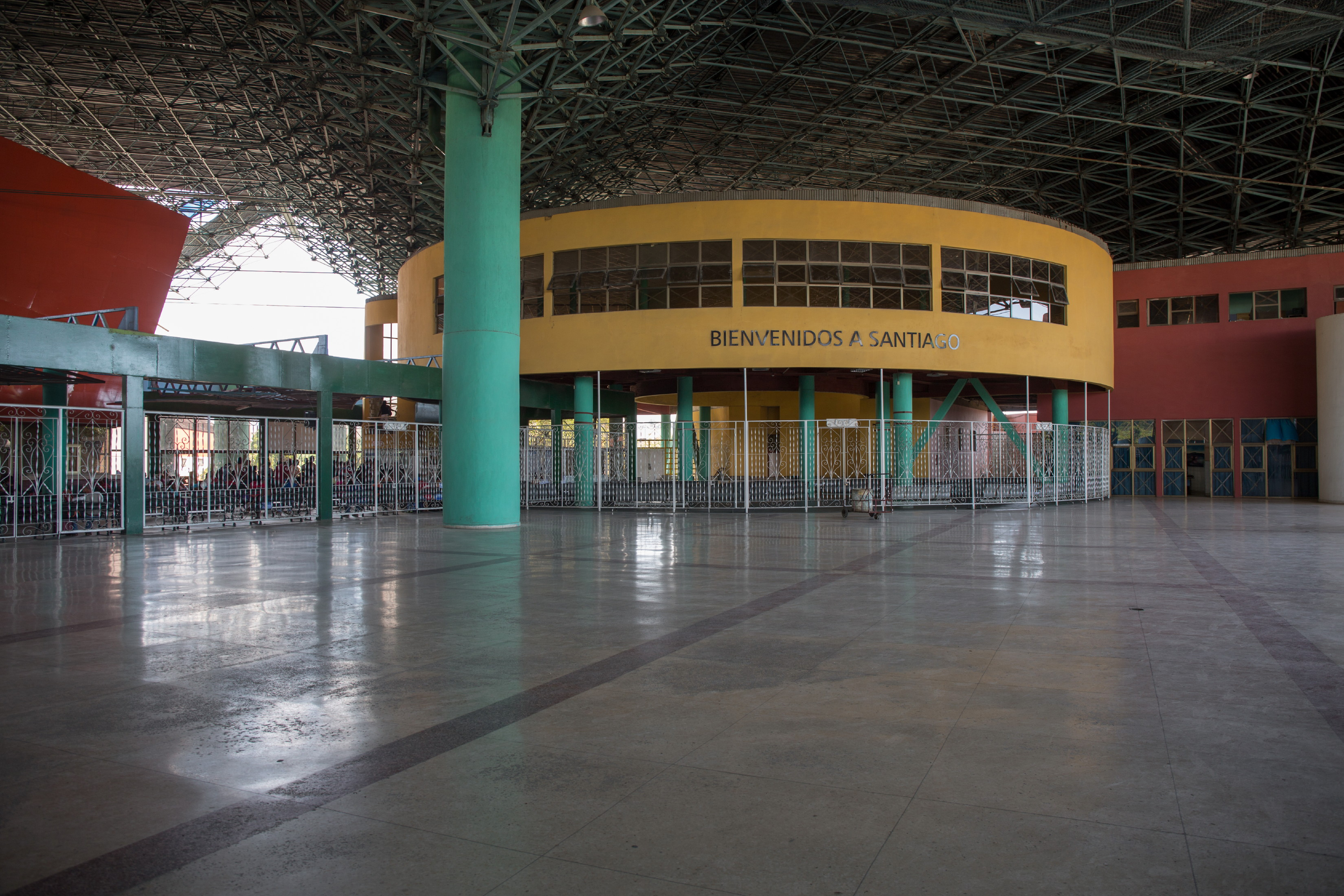
Station hall

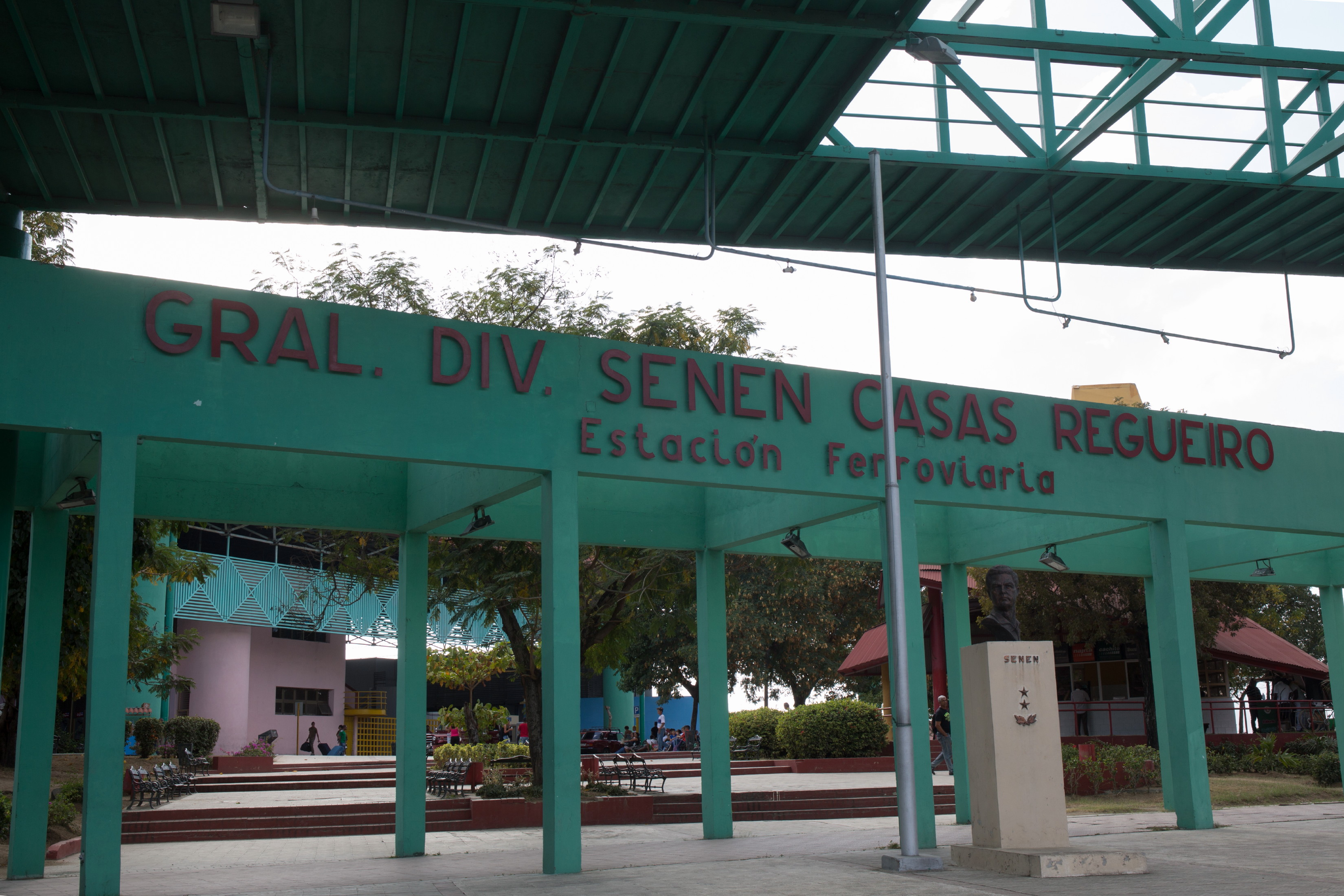
Station signboard (1)

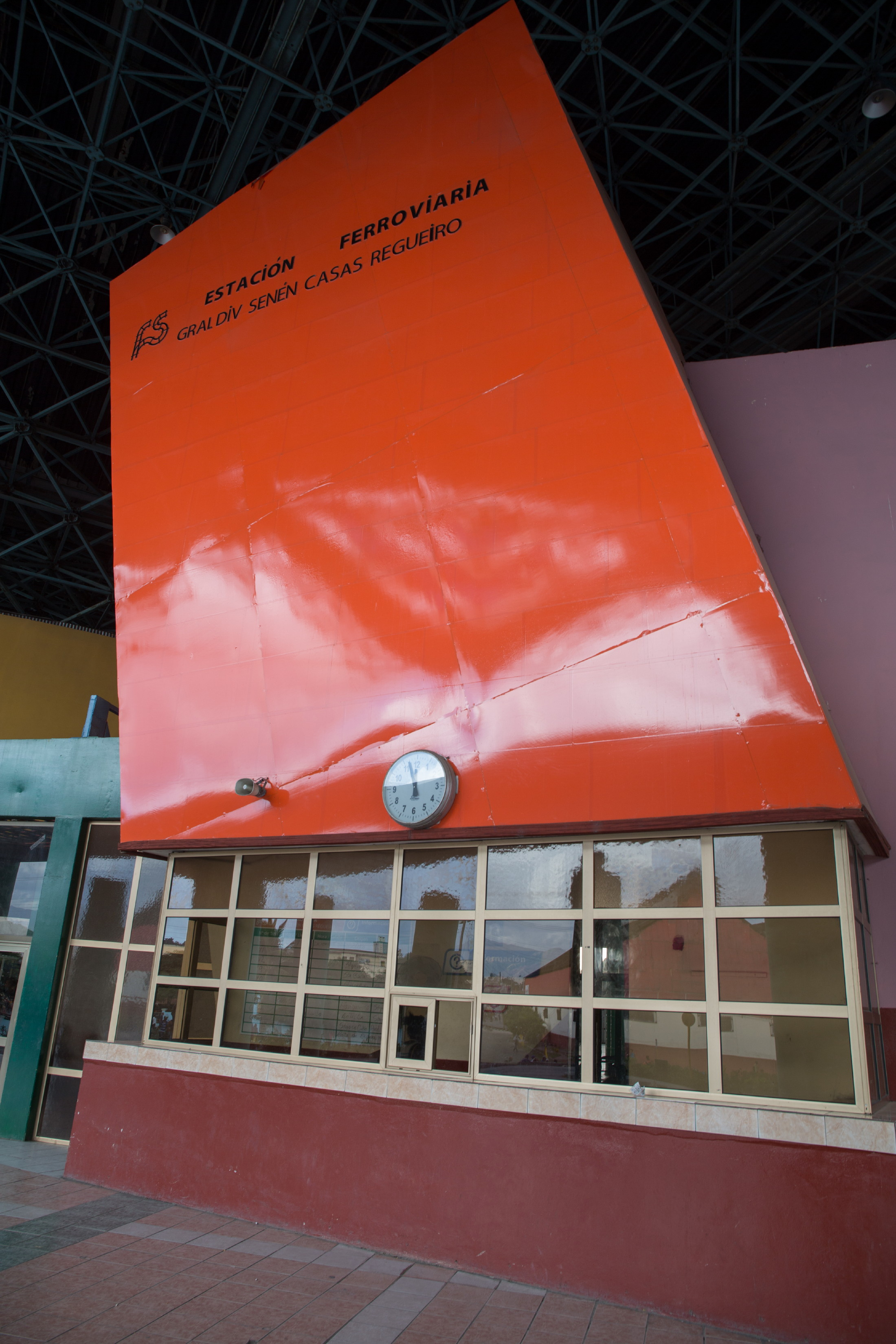
Station signboard (2)

== See also ==
- Camagüey railway station
- Havana Central railway station
- Santa Clara railway station
