= Tren Francés =

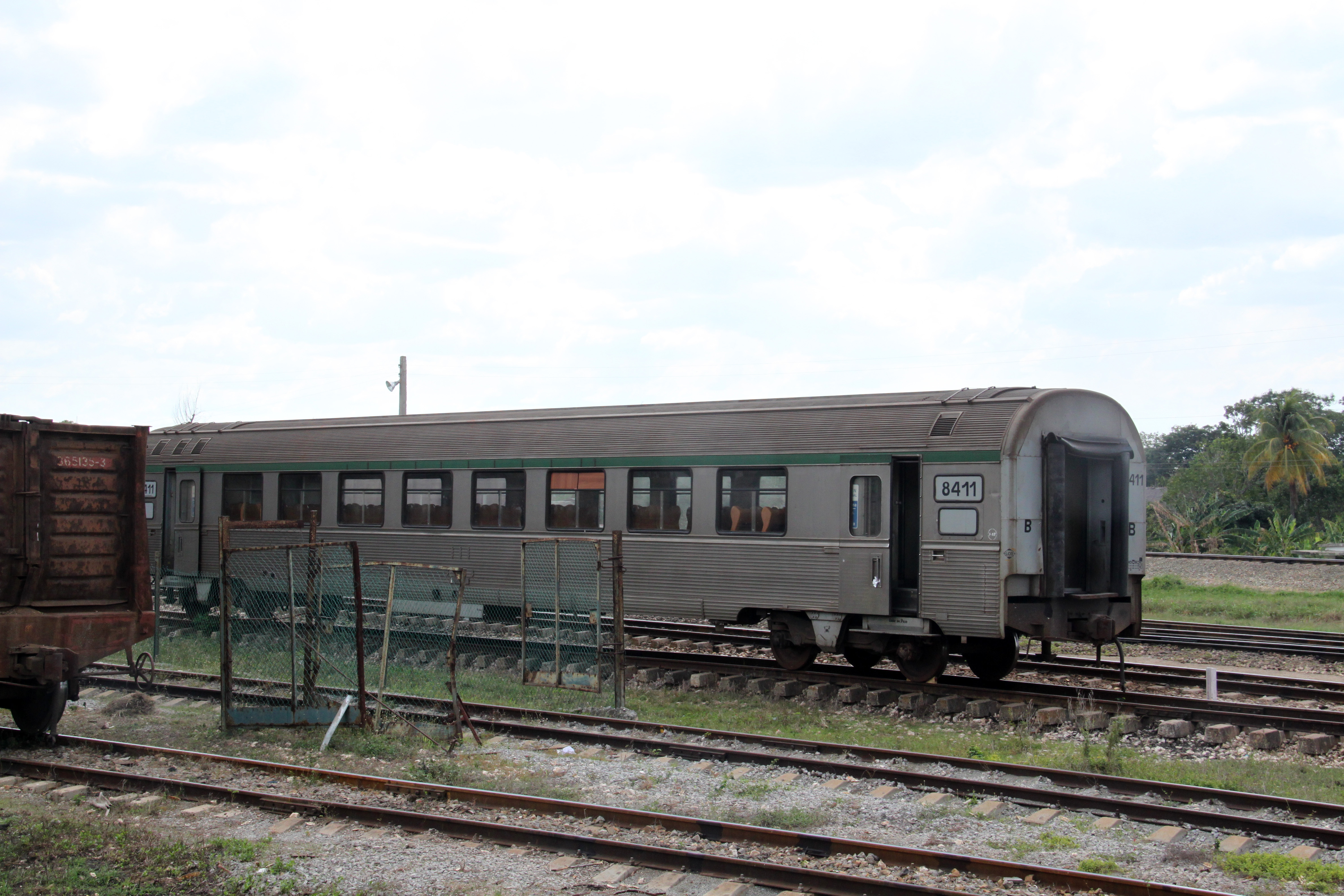
- A coach of the Tren Francés in Las Tunas station depot

Overview
- Service type: Inter-city rail
- Status: Ceased operating
- Locale: Cuba
- Current operator: Ferrocarriles de Cuba

Route
- Termini: Havana; Santiago de Cuba
- Stops: 4
- Distance travelled: 854 km (531 mi)
- Average journey time: 14 hours, 45 minutes
- Service frequency: Every 3 days
- Train numbers: 1 and 2
- Line used: Havana-Santiago

On-board services
- Classes: 1st and 2nd
- Sleeping arrangements: no
- Auto-rack arrangements: no
- Catering facilities: On-board cafeteria

Technical
- Rolling stock: 1 diesel locomotive (from CR); 12 ex-TEE coaches (from SNCF)
- Track gauge: 1,435 mm (4 ft 8 1/2 in)
Route map
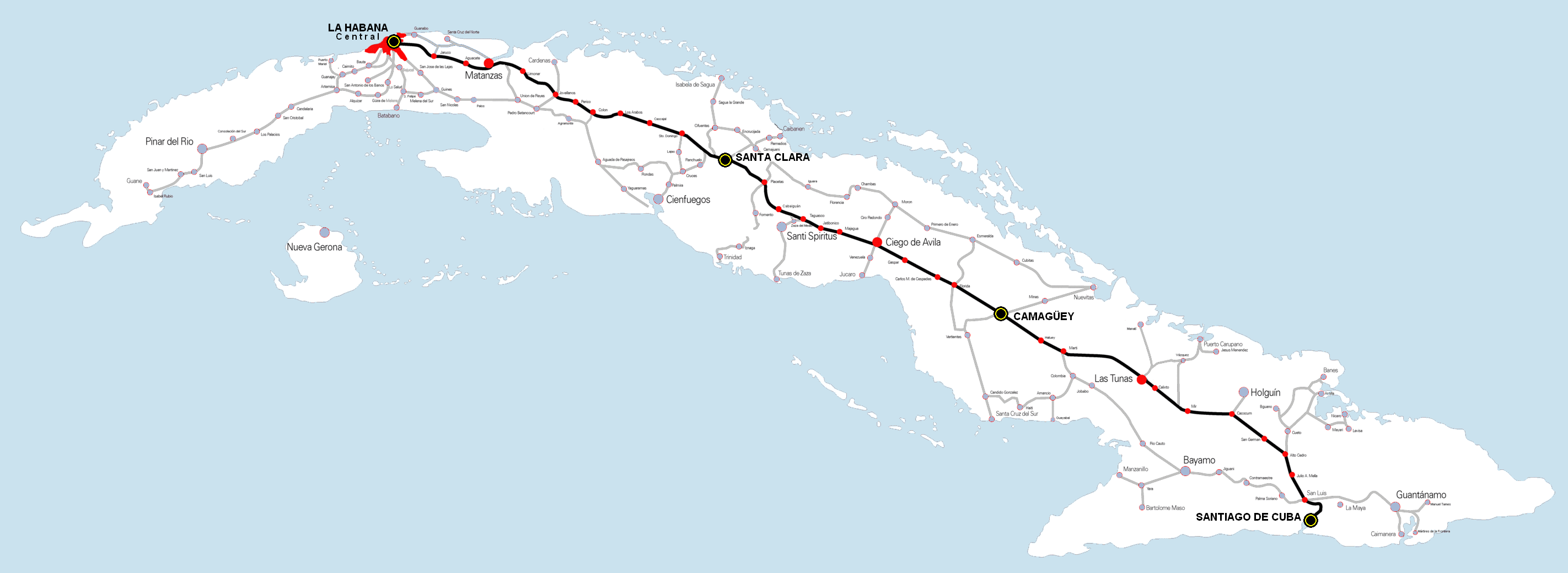

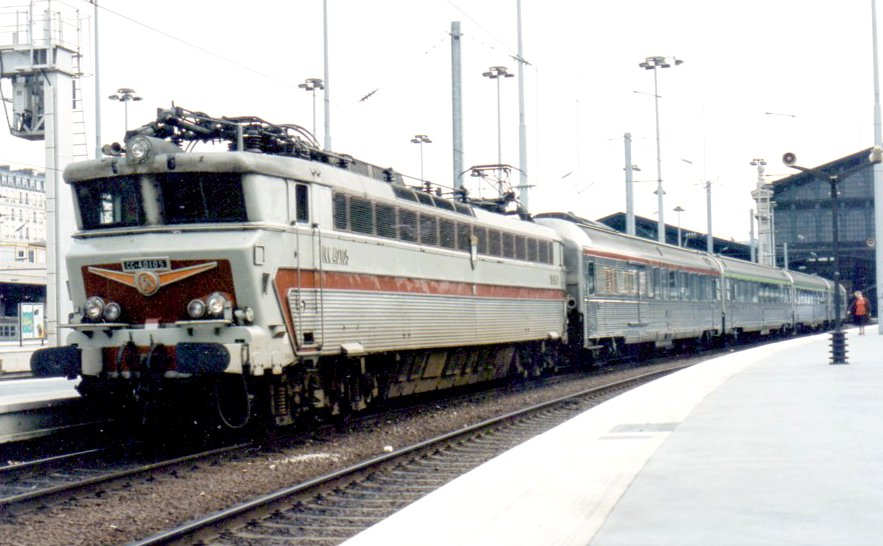
The TEE coaches (right) used for the Francés. The pictures shows the TEE Étoile du Nord in Paris Nord station (1995)

Tren Francés (Spanish for "French Train") was the name of the flagship Cuban InterCity service between Havana and Santiago. Owned by Ferrocarriles de Cuba, it was operated by SNCF ex-Trans Europ Express (TEE) PBA coaches, originally used in Europe between Paris and Amsterdam, on the Étoile du Nord service and Mistral 69 coaches used in France between Paris and Nice on Le Mistral. Both of these two French flagship trains were replaced by TGV and Thalys from 1982 (Mistral) to 1996 (Étoile du Nord). The Tren Francés was formed by 12 coaches and a Chinese-built diesel locomotive.

Over the years, the coaches deteriorated. In 2019, the service was replaced by a new service using Chinese-built coaches.

== Overview ==
The Tren Francés (also spelled El Francés or Especial), named after the country of origin of the coaches (France) was the fastest long-distance service in Cuba. It had the most modern coaches purchased by FFCC from SNCF in 2000 for 38 million francs, and was divided into two classes named primera especial (1st) and primera (nominally 1st, identifiable as 2nd). There were no sleeping cars, couchettes or car-carrying wagons.

== Route ==
Travelling along the Havana-Santiago line, the Tren Francés made intermediate stops only at the main cities of Santa Clara and Camagüey. Other important cities traversed along the route were Matanzas, Colón, Ciego de Ávila, Florida, and Las Tunas. Some junction stations to nearby provincial capitals were served at Cabaiguán (for Sancti Spíritus) and Cacocum (for Holguín).

Havana – Santiago (eastbound)

Station	Time	Km / Mi	City served
Havana Central	18:27	0 km (0 mi)	Havana
Santa Clara	00:06	286 km (178 mi)	Santa Clara
Camagüey	03:39	538 km (334 mi)	Camagüey
Santiago de Cuba	09:12	854 km (531 mi)	Santiago de Cuba

Santiago – Havana (westbound)

Station	Time	Km / Mi	City served
Santiago de Cuba	20:17	0 km (0 mi)	Santiago de Cuba
Camagüey	02:07	316 km (196 mi)	Camagüey
Santa Clara	06:38	568 km (353 mi)	Santa Clara
Havana Central	10:57	854 km (531 mi)	Havana

== See also ==
- Ferrocarriles de Cuba
- Lists of named passenger trains
