= Royal Shipyard of Havana =

Naval shipyard in Cuba

- Real Arsenal de La Habana
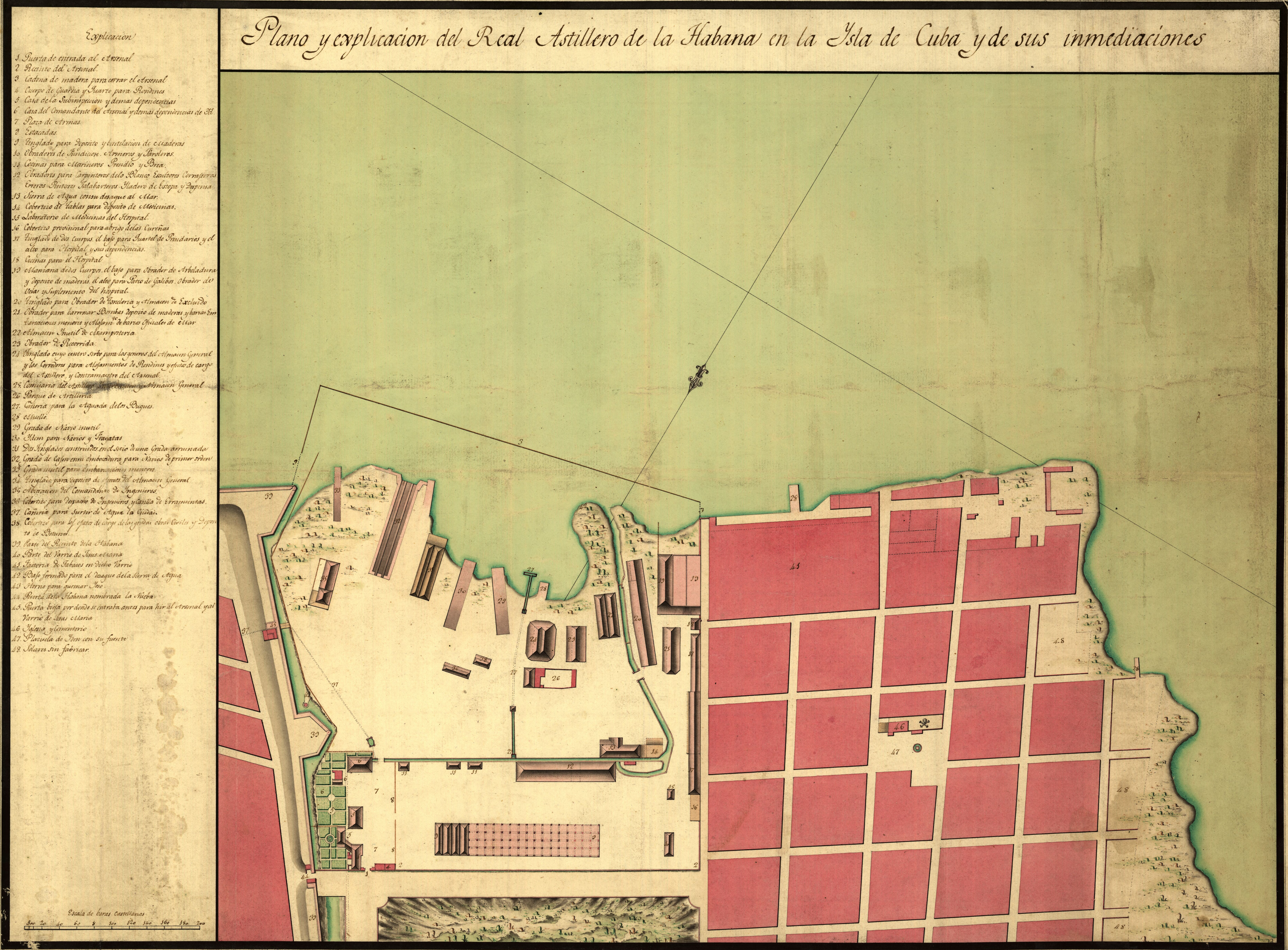

General information
- Location: Havana, Cuba
- Current tenants: Havana Central railway station
- Construction started: ca. 1717
- Closed: 1902

The Royal Arsenal of Havana was located South East of the Campo de Marte and played a prominent role in Spanish shipbuilding in the 18th century. In total, seventy-four warships were built in Havana during this century.

According to the UNESCO, Havana Royal Shipyard in the 18th century developed the most complete dockyard in the New World.

== Location ==
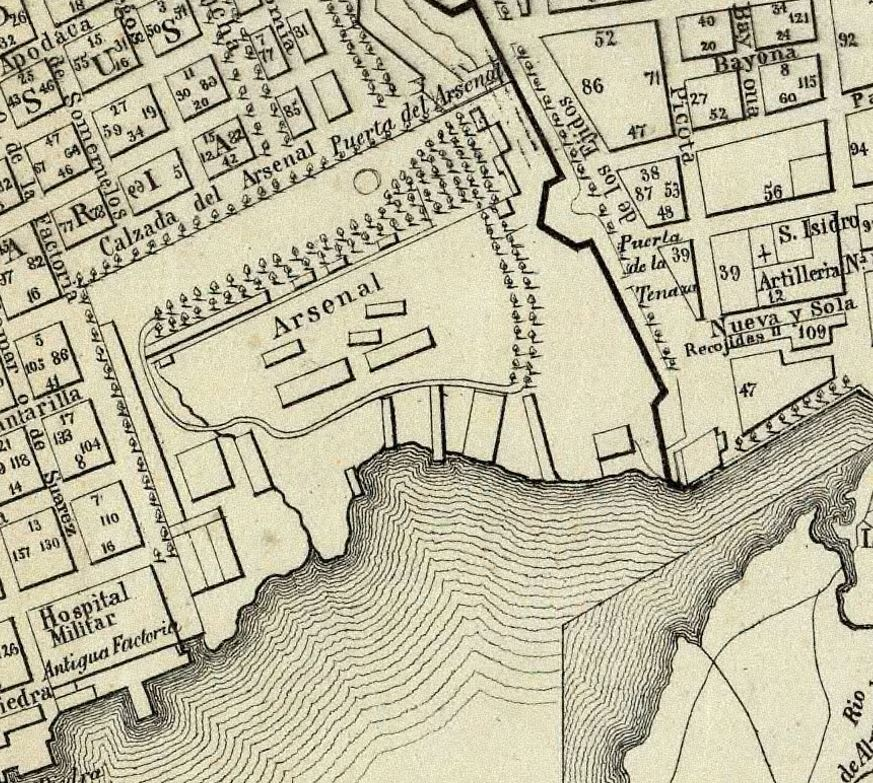
Arsenal de La Habana crop from B. May Y Ca, 1853

The Royal Arsenal was located southeast of the Campo de Marte, outside the southernmost gate of the city in the area presently occupied by the Havana Central railway station. The areaof the Royal Arsenal formed a quadrilateral that occupied approximately nine hectares. About three hectares was vacant land, a large part was low-lying and marshy; five hectares were dedicated as a staging area of materials, barracks, and warehouses; two or three hectares were used for shipbuilding and ship repair: davits, cranes, docks, transport pits; there was also a hospital for the high incidence of yellow fever. On the south side of the Arsenal, some five hundred meters of coastline formed a small inlet of almost a hectare in area, with low bottoms, which allowed the ships to be launched.

== History ==
The shipyard had a minor role in relation to the Armada de Barlovento. (Note: The Armada de Barlovento (Windward Fleet) was a military formation that consisted of 50 ships created by the Spanish Empire to protect its overseas American territories from attacks from its European enemies.), but it is with the arrival of Juan de Acosta, considered "one of the most prominent figures in Spanish shipbuilding", in 1717 as lieutenant of the Company of Seafarers and appointed captain of the Maestranza del Arsenal in 1722 that Havana begins to stand out as a shipyard. He will supervise, between 1724 and 1740, the construction of twenty-three vessels, including the ships San Juan and San Lorenzo and, between 1732 and 1736, the construction of the ships Africa (San José), Europa (Nuestra Señora del Pilar), Asia (Our Lady of Loreto, 1735) and America (Our Lady of Belén).1 Later, with the dissolution of the Armada de Barlovento in 1748, the Veracruz naval base was transferred to Havana.4

From 1715 to 1759, a third of Spanish ship production was from the Havana shipyard. In 1735, its expansion, in the same port, meant an increase in construction capacity.

Total production between 1765 and 1789 reached sixty-two ships, among them 19 ships of the line, note 1 five of which were first class, that is, with more than 100 guns —Santísima Trinidad, Mejicano (San Hipólito), Conde de Regla, Real Carlos, San Hermenegildo— and fifteen frigates.

== Production ==
In the first decade of the 17th century, the Spanish Crown ordered the construction of 7 galleons destined for the windward navy. Their construction was in charge of Captain-General Don Juan de Borja Enríquez, who in April 1610 officially informed the King that he had already built 5, of which he said that they were completely finished and if it had been necessary they could leave in a month. In 1737, the Royal Trade Company of Havana was founded, among whose obligations was to build ships for the war and merchant navies, assuming control of the Arsenal of Havana. In this way, the Royal Company contributed significantly to the increase in the activity of the shipyards with the construction of warships for the Spanish Navy and, consequently, to the maintenance of the naval tradition in Cuba.

== Gallery ==
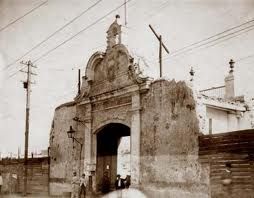
City gate at the real arsenal de La Habana in 1870.

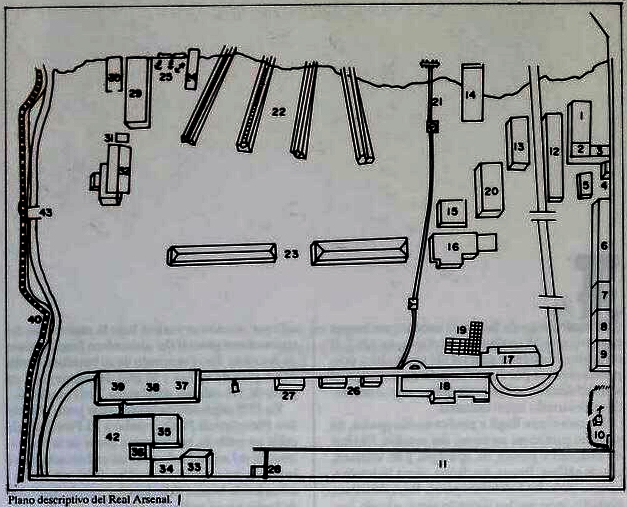
Plano descriptivo del Real Arsenal

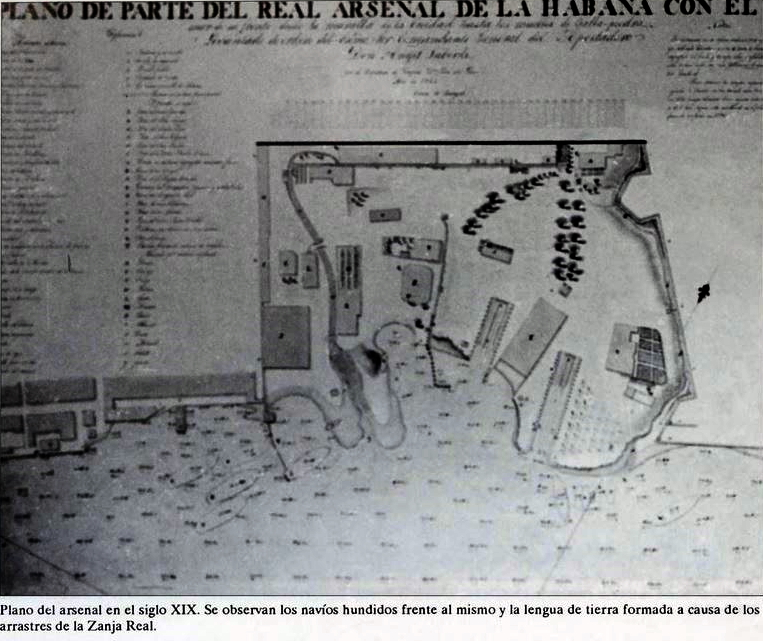
Plano del arsenal de La Habana en el siglo XIX

== See also ==
- List of buildings in Havana
- Real Arsenal
- Havana Shipyards
- Spanish Empire
- Havana
