= Camagüey railway station =

Railway station in Cuba

Camagüey (Camagüey Central)
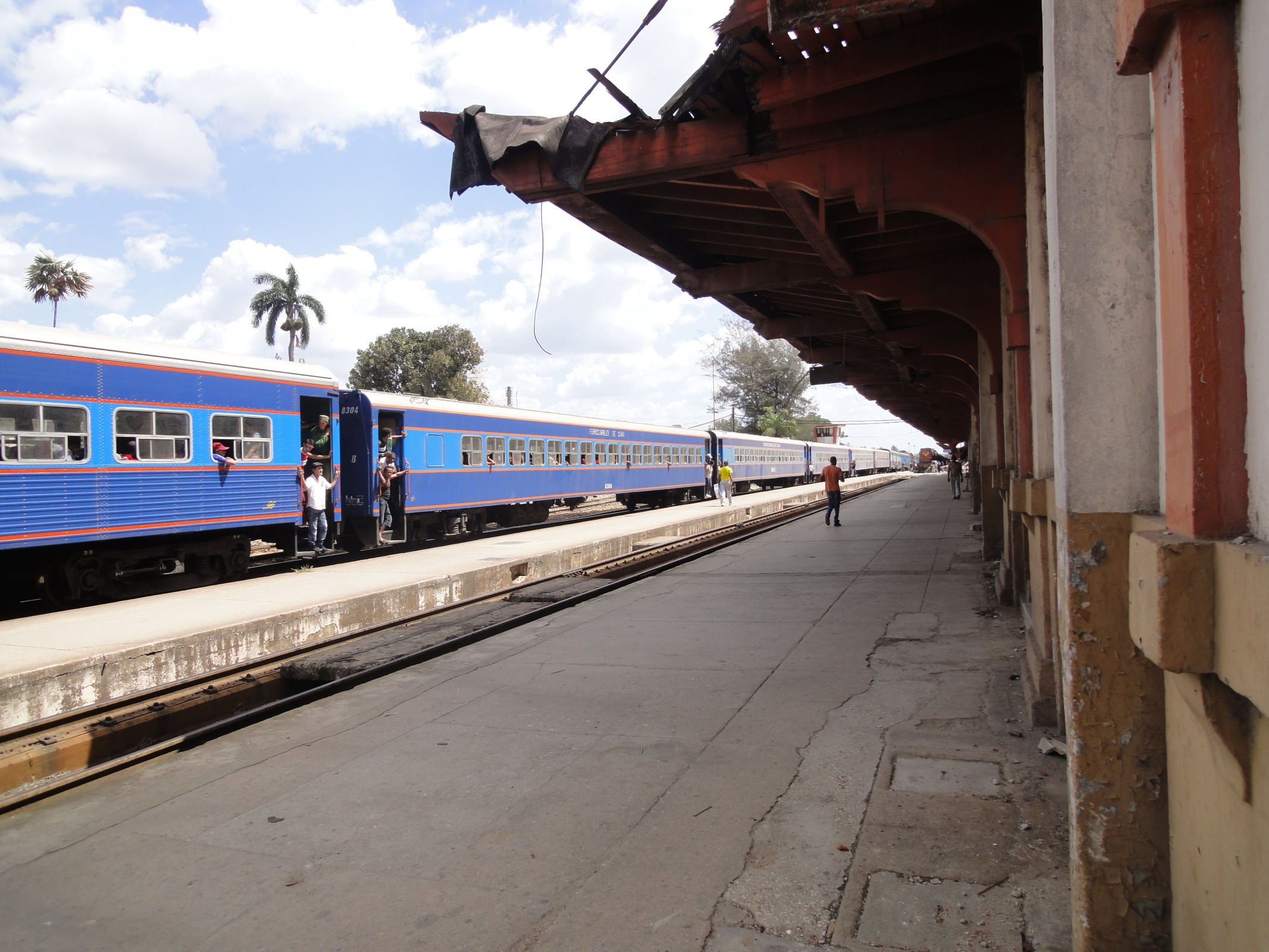
- View of the station platforms

General information
- Location: Avenida Van Horne and Avenida Finlay; Camagüey, Cuba
- Coordinates: 21.389330°N 77.915712°W
- System: Ferrocarriles de Cuba
- Owner: National Government
- Lines: Havana–Santiago; Camagüey–Nuevitas; Camagüey–Santa Cruz del Sur
- Platforms: 3 (at-grade)
- Tracks: 3

Construction
- Structure type: At-grade
- Platform levels: 1
- Parking: yes
- Accessible: yes

History
- Opened: 1846
Location

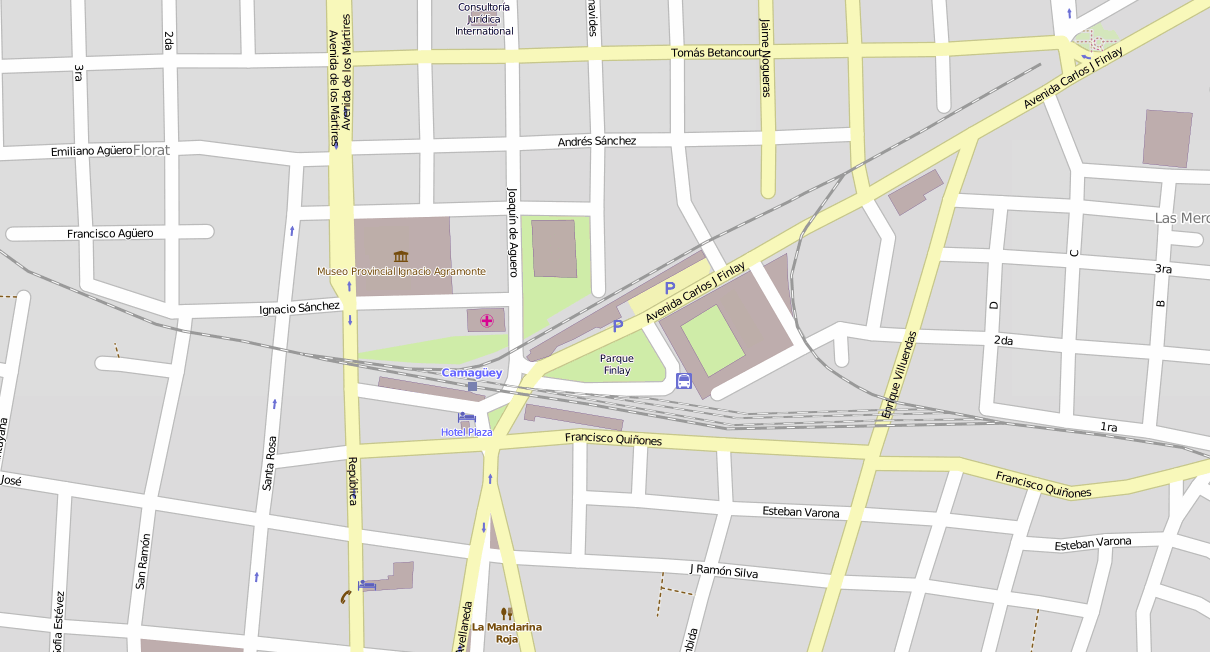
OSM map of the station and surrounding area

Camagüey is the main railway station of the city of Camagüey, seat of the homonym province, Cuba. The station, informally known as Camagüey Central, is owned by the state company Ferrocarriles de Cuba (FFCC) and is located in the Avenida Van Horne, in the middle of the city and just in front of the Hotel Plaza.

It is one of the most important stations of Cuba and, along with Havana Central, Santiago and Santa Clara, is a network's divisional headquarter.

== History ==
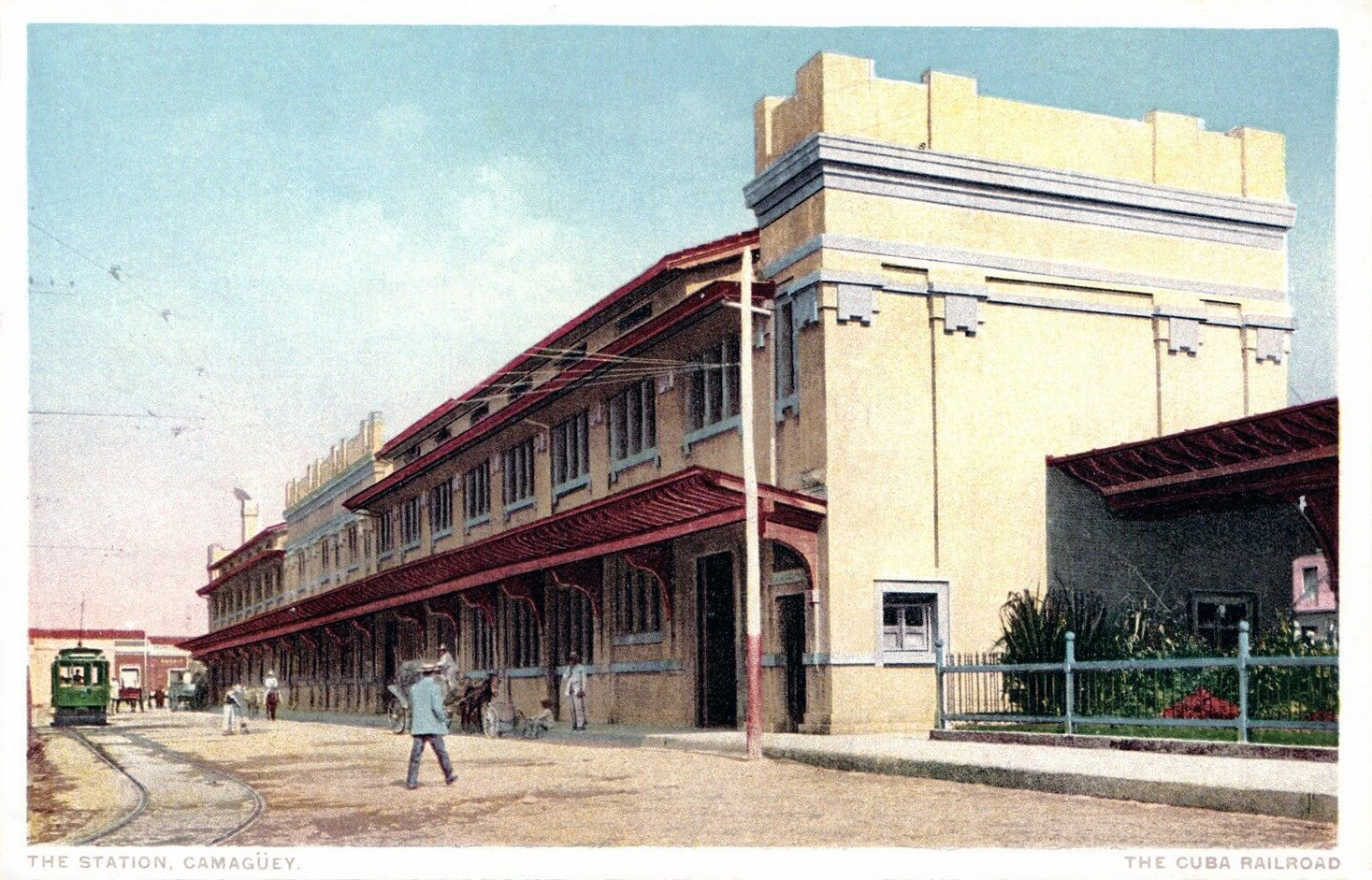
Train Station circa 1920

The station was projected in 1830s and opened on 5 April 1846. It was the southern terminus of the line to the town of Nuevitas, on the Atlantic Coast.

== Structure ==
Camagüey station has a large one-floor building in Spanish Colonial style. It counts three tracks, and the third serves a minor shed, extended along the nearby Finlay Park. It is crossed by the Avenida Carlos J. Finlay and, after a level crossing, counts a secondary passenger building. 2 km in south east, in the Garrido ward, it counts a larger shed with a motive power depot.

All the lines running through the station, including the main one (Havana–Santiago), are single-track lines.

== Services ==
The station is served by several long-distance trains linking almost the whole island as the flagship Tren Francés (French Train) Havana–Santa Clara–Santiago. Other long-distance trains, principally departing/ending at Havana Central, link Camagüey to Holguín, Guantánamo, Bayamo, Matanzas, Ciego de Ávila, Las Tunas, Manzanillo and other cities. There are also some inter-regional and regional trains to Morón, Nuevitas, Vertientes and Santa Cruz del Sur.

== See also ==
- Havana Central railway station
- Santiago de Cuba railway station
- Santa Clara railway station
