= Santísima Trinidad (1600s) =

Santísima Trinidad was a Spanish 400-ton galleon commanded by Captain Francisco de Peralta, which escaped with the Panama treasure when Sir Henry Morgan attacked Panama City in January 1671. It was captured by English pirates in April 1680, renamed Trinity and used as their flagship. It was constructed at the Real Arsenal in Havana.

== See also ==
- Robert Searle
