= Real Arsenal =

The Real Arsenal was located in Havana, Cuba and was at one time the largest shipyard in the world during the 1700s. It produced ships like Santísima Trinidad.
