= Raizúa =

Hamlet in Cuba

- Hamlet
- Potrero Raizúa
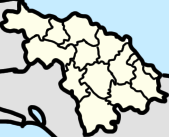
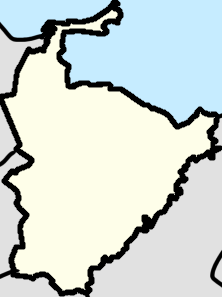
- Location within Cuba Location within Villa Clara Province Location within Encrucijada
- Coordinates: 22°35′37.5238″N 79°50′20.0479″W
- Country: Cuba
- Province: Villa Clara
- Municipality: Encrucijada
- Ward: Constancia

Population
  - Total: 78

Raizúa is a hamlet in Encrucijada, Cuba. It is located east of Constancia and west of Paso Real. Raizua has a lot of caballería called Micaela.

== Geography ==
Raizua's northern border is the Luis Perez farm and the east border is the Jose Perez Vergara farm.

== Education ==
The settlements of Raizua, Paso Real, and Pavon have 3 Escuela Mixta (Mixed Schools), which educate both boys and girls. The one in Raizua is called La Escuela de Raizua.

== History ==
Raizua was a part of the District of Calabazar and was formerly known as Potrero Raizúa.

Under general Máximo Gómez in the Ten Years' War during a battle in Raizua the train from Sagua La Grande to Raizua was attacked by Luis Morejón, in which he got injured and his assistant Vega was killed.

On June 23, 1899, the Province of Santa Clara appointed a sworn guard to guard Raizúa, and many more settlements in the province.
