= Tuinicú (Encrucijada) =

Tunicú
- Hamlet
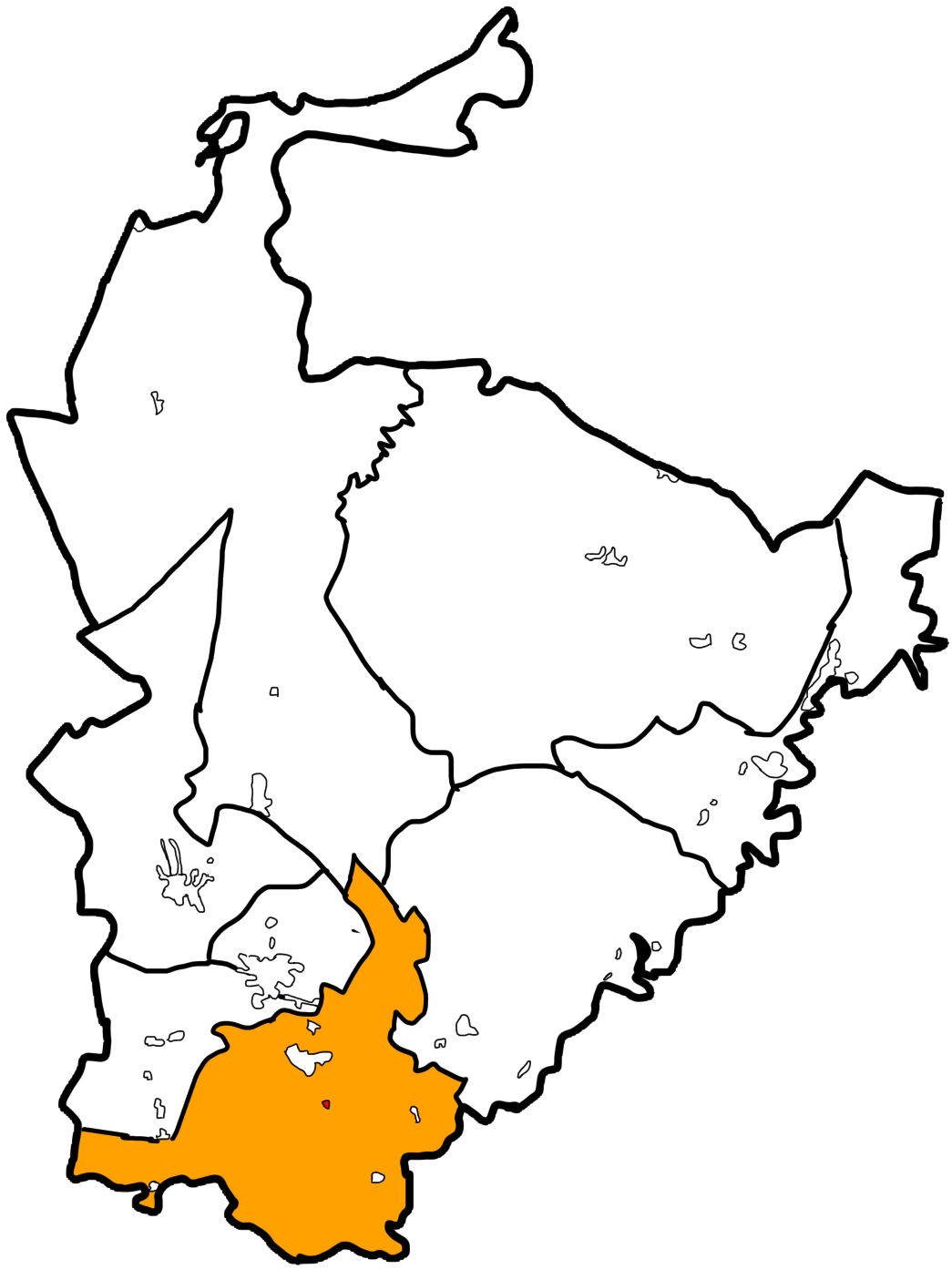
- Tuinicú (red) in Abel Santamaria (orange) in Encrucijada

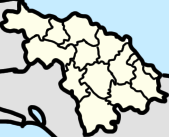
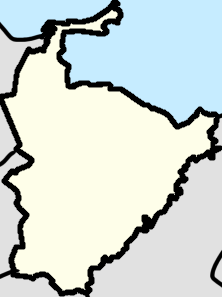
- Location in Cuba Tunicú (Villa Clara Province) Tunicú (Encrucijada)
- Coordinates: 22°34′50″N 79°50′56″W
- Country: Cuba
- Province: Villa Clara
- Municipality: Encrucijada
- Ward: Constancia

Population (2013)
  - Total: 112

Tuinicú, also known as Tunicú, is a small hamlet in Encrucijada, Cuba

== Geography ==
Tunicú has the same name as the Tunicú River, north of the town, with it having a bridge over it going to Abel Santamaría.

== History ==
In March 1896 during the Cuban War of Independence, general Jose Larcet Morlot went to Encrucijada, the Sagua la Chica River, Paso Real, and the Tuinicú River. To later enter Santa Clara, Vega Alta, and Calabazar de Sagua.

In the Ten Years' War rebels in Cinco Villas District went through San Gil, Ayagan, and Tuinicú to then split up to get Encrucijada and Calabazar de Sagua.

== Transportation ==
Tuinicú is on a rail line starting in Santa Clara, going to Crucero Margot, to Luis Arcos Bergnes, Vega Alta, Canoa, Tuinicu, Constancia, Encrucijada, Mata, El Vaquerito, Aguada la Piedra, Cifuentes, San Diego del Valle, Conyedo, and finally back to Santa Clara.
