= Constancia (Encrucijada) =

- Ward
- Abel Santamaria
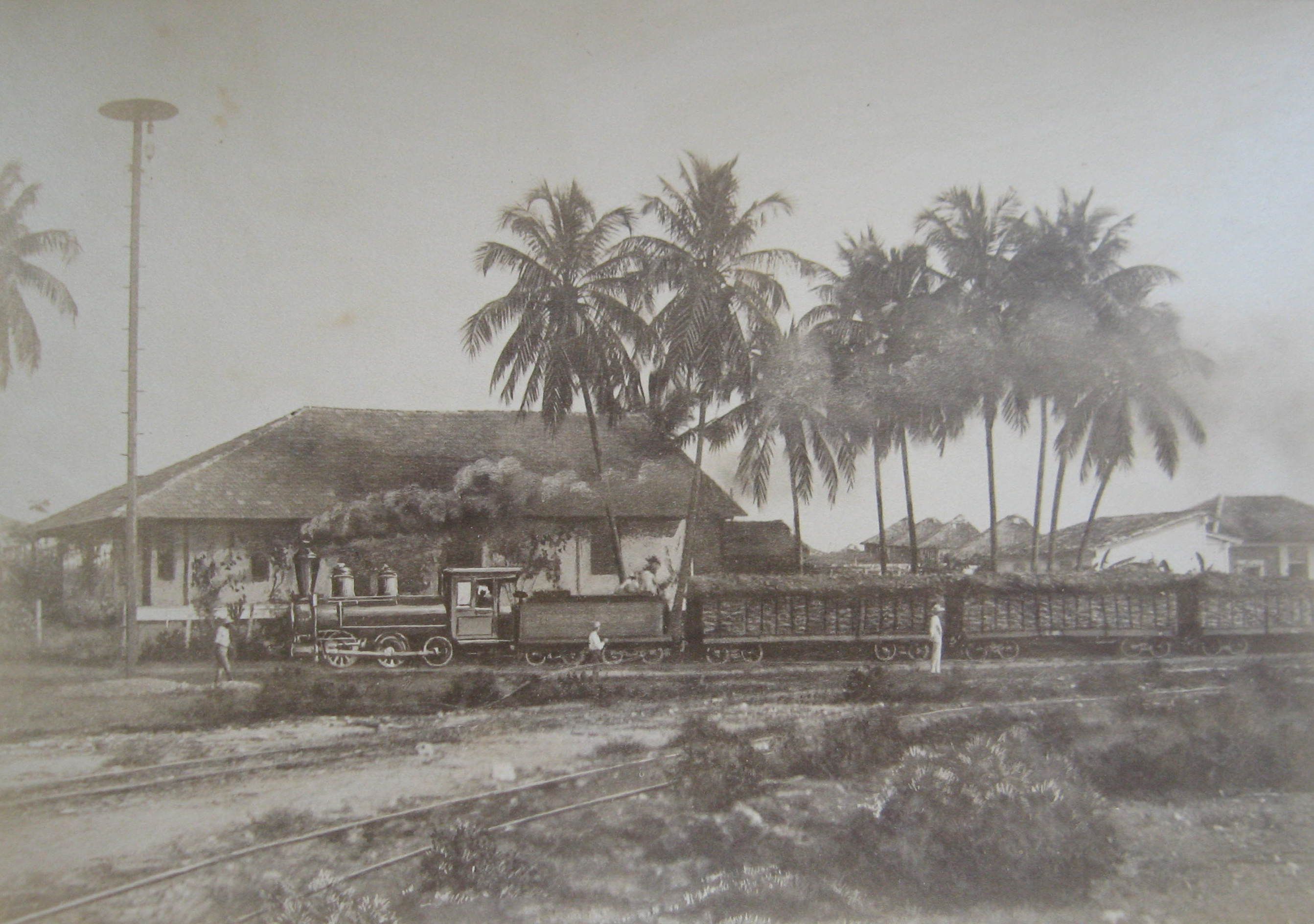
- Constancia (1898)

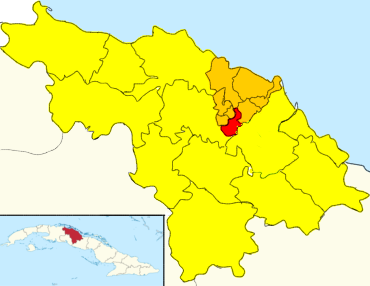
- Map of Abel Santamaría (red) in Encrucijada (orange) in Villa Clara (yellow)

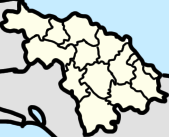
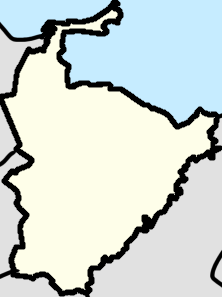
- Location within Cuba Location within Villa Clara Province Location within Encrucijada
- Coordinates: 22°35′33″N 79°51′24″W
- Country: Cuba
- Province: Villa Clara Province
- Municipality: Encrucijada
- Founded: 1867
- Named for: Abel Santamaría

Government
  - President: Celina Margarita Ruiz Rodríguez ( PCC)

Area
  - Ward: 67 km^{2} (26 sq mi)
  - Urban Settlement of Abel Santamaría: 0.75 km^{2} (0.29 sq mi)

Population (2012)
  - Ward: 2,810
  - Density: 42/km^{2} (110/sq mi)
  - Urban: 1,460
  - Rural: 1,350
  - Urban settlement of Abel Santamaría: 1,247

Abel Santamaria also known as Constancia is a ward (consejo popular) and an Urban Settlement in Encrucijada, Villa Clara Province, Cuba.

== Geography ==
Towns in Abel Santamaría’s ward are:

- Canoa
- Tuinicú
- Paso Real
- Raizúa
- Castaño
- Las Mercedes
- Progreso
- Cayo Hueso
- Guadalupe
- Congojas

Abel Santamaria is south of La Sierra and El Purio. It is north of Santa Clara Municipality. To the east is the Sagua la Chica River and its west is Encrucijada Sur.

== Education ==
Schools in Constancia include:

- Boris Luis Santa Coloma Primary School
- CI Sueños de Abel
- Mariana Grajales Rural Primary School
- Augusto César Sandino Rural Primary School
- Roberto Rodríguez Rural Primary School
- Jesús Menéndez Rural Primary School
- Marcelo Salado Rural Primary School

== Transportation ==
Constancia is on the Ingenio Constantia Railway to Cayo Hueso, and which links it to the railway that starts in Santa Clara, going to Crucero Margot, to Luis Arcos Bergnes, Vega Alta, Canoa, Tuinicu, Constancia, Encrucijada, Mata, El Vaquerito, Aguada la Piedra, Cifuentes, San Diego del Valle, Conyedo, and finally back to Santa Clara.

== Arts ==
=== Landmarks ===
In Abel Santamaria there are monuments including:

- a Spanish Fort
- Bust of Jesús Menéndez Larrondo
