= Ingenio Constantia Railway =

Railway line in Cuba

Coordinates: 22.59467°N 79.85608°W

Ingenio Constancia Railway
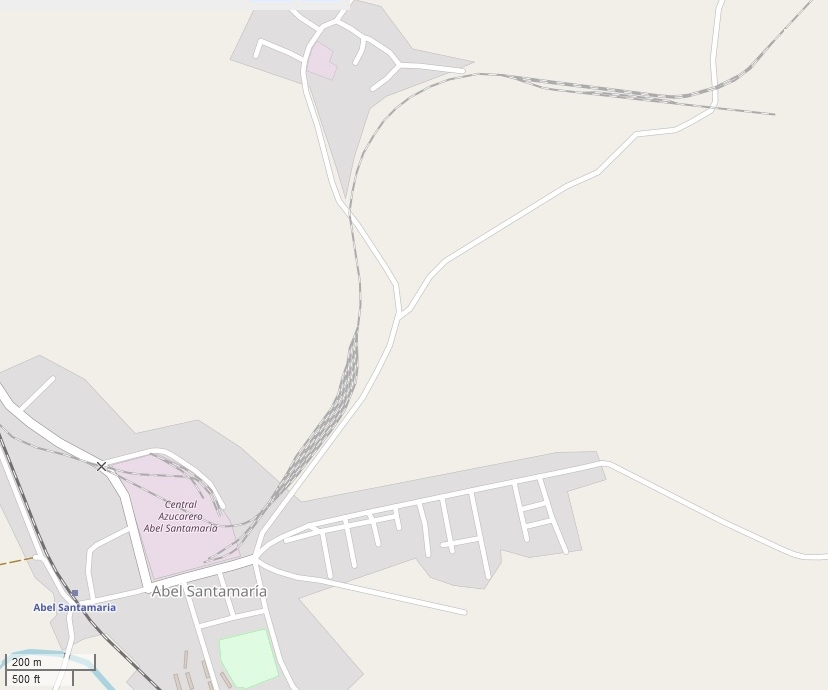
- The railway that goes from Constancia, though the CAI Abel Santamaria to Cayo Hueso

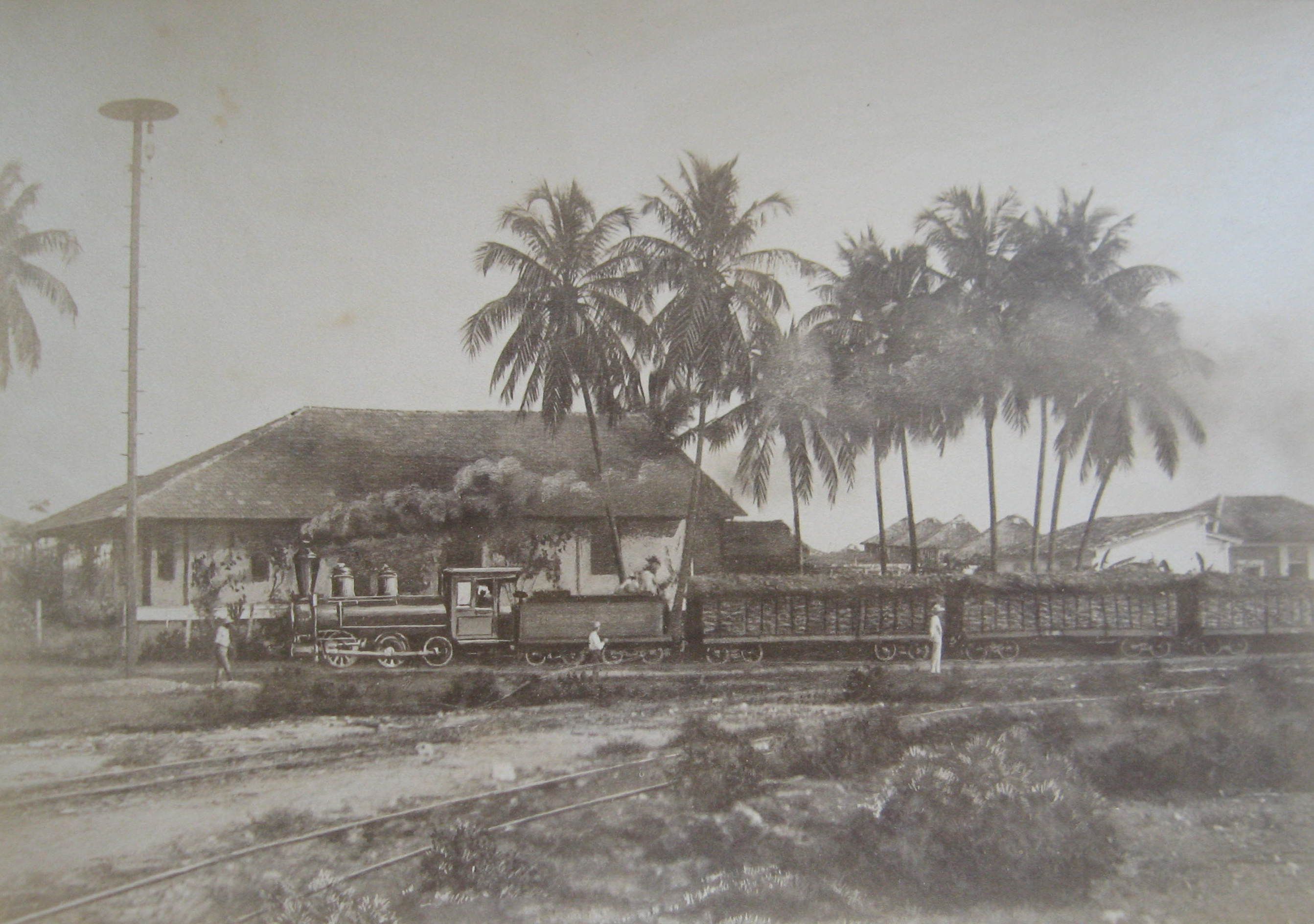

Technical
- Length: 68.4

The Ingenio Constancia Railway is a narrow-gauge railway with a gauge of 762 mm (30 in) in Cuba, of which parts of the sections running along the CAI Abel Santamaria in Constancia, Encrucijada and are still in use today.

== Route ==
In 1909, the narrow-gauge railway, which was still 68.4 km long, connected the Central Constancia, now called CAI Abel Santamaria sugar factory with Santa Clara, Castillito, Yaguramas and Horquita. The rails weighed 15 pounds/yard (30 kg/m).

== Vehicles ==
There were nine locomotives in 1909, at least one of which had been delivered before 1898, as well as one passenger car, 18 flat cars and 405 sugar cane cars.
