= Aristarco O'Reilly Díaz =

Cuban landscape painter (1927-1985)

Aristarco O’Reilly Díaz
- Aristarco O'Reilly Díaz
- Born: 1927; Encrucijada, Las Villas Province, Cuba
- Died: September 19, 1985; Mexico City, Mexico
- Education: Academia Nacional de Bellas Artes San Alejandro; Real Academia de Bellas Artes de San Fernando; Escuela de Pintura y Escultura La Esmeralda
- Known for: Landscape painting
- Parents: Pedro O’Reilly (father); Mónica Díaz (mother)
- Relatives: Vitervo O’Reilly Díaz (brother)

Aristarco O’Reilly Díaz (1927 – 19 September 1985) was a Cuban landscape painter. Born in Encrucijada, in the former province of Las Villas, he later lived and worked in Cuba, Europe, and Mexico.

== Early life ==
O’Reilly Díaz was born in 1927 in Encrucijada, Las Villas Province, Cuba. In the early 1930s, his mother, Mónica Díaz, a seamstress, separated from her husband Pedro O’Reilly and moved with her children to Havana. The family included five sons and five daughters. Among his siblings were a physician, a graduate in literature, and a scientist, while Aristarco pursued the visual arts. He was the brother of engineer and academic Vitervo O’Reilly Díaz.

== Education and career ==
He studied at the Academia Nacional de Bellas Artes San Alejandro in Havana and later at the Real Academia de Bellas Artes de San Fernando in Madrid. He also attended the Escuela de Pintura y Escultura La Esmeralda in Mexico City.

After returning to Cuba, he worked as a restorer at the Museo Nacional de Bellas Artes in Havana. In 1957 he traveled to Mexico, where he encountered the Mexican muralist movement during its period of prominence. Over the course of his career, he exhibited in Europe and the United States before establishing himself permanently in Mexico.

== Artistic development ==
O’Reilly's early work focused on colonial Cuban subjects treated in an impressionistic manner, characterized by the use of color as a primary expressive element.

After traveling to Mexico, his painting became more influenced by the Mexican muralist movement. His later works showed a loosening of contour and a greater emphasis on color structure and compositional movement. Contemporary commentary contrasted his approach with that of Miguel Collazo, noting O’Reilly's reduced emphasis on drawing in favor of chromatic organization.

Critics also observed the presence of figurative compositions that moved toward symbolic or dreamlike atmospheres, as well as occasional erotic themes.

O’Reilly Díaz died in Mexico City on 19 September 1985 during the earthquake that struck the Mexican capital.
