= Guajén, Cuba =

Guajén
- Settlement
- El Guajén
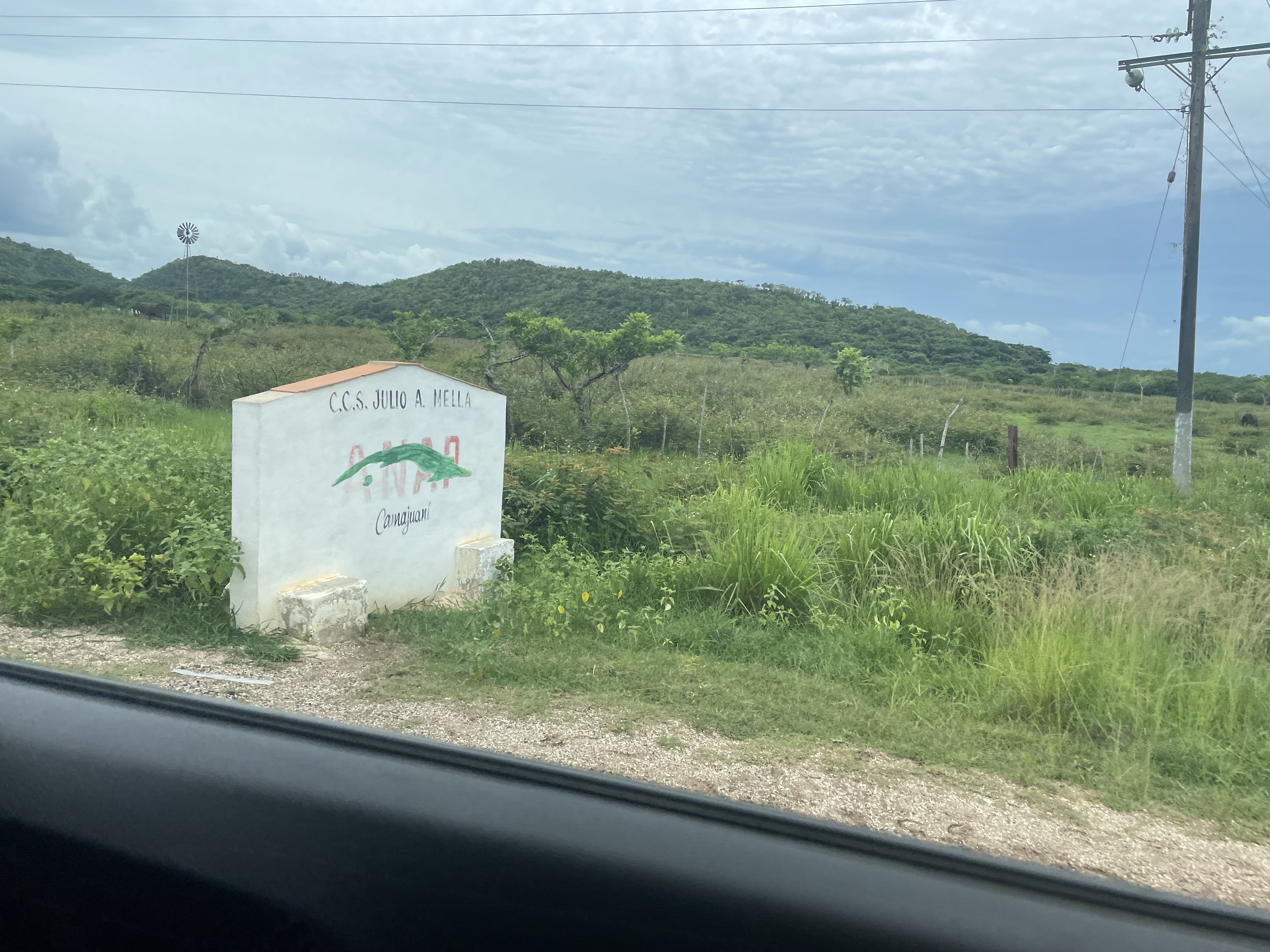
- CCS Julio Antonio Mella, located in Guajén

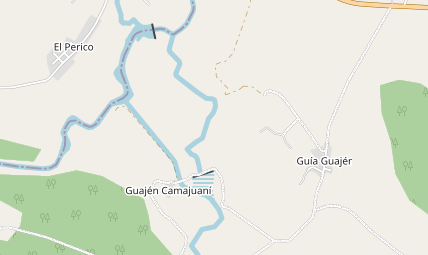
- OpenStreetMap of El Guajén

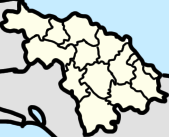
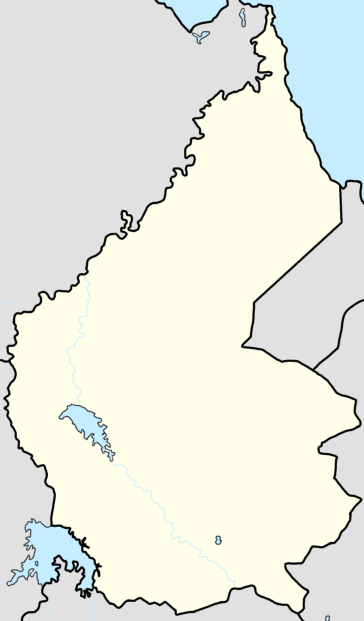
- Location within Cuba Location within Villa Clara Province Location within Camajuaní
- Coordinates: 22°34′53″N 79°45′47″W
- Country: Cuba
- Province: Villa Clara
- Municipality: Camajuaní
- Ward (consejo popular): Aguada de Moya

Government
  - Constituency Delegate (40th of Camajuaní): Lázaro González Marrero

Population (2022)
  - Total: 570

Guajén also known as El Guajén is a small community in Camajuaní, Cuba. It splits into the circunscripciónes of Guajén Camajuaní (on the Camajuani River) and Guía Guajén.

The name “Guajén” has Aboriginal origins.

== Government ==
Camajuaní has multiple Constituency Delegate (Delegado Circunscripción) for every community, Guajén has Constituency Delegate #40 Lázaro González Marrero.

== Geography ==
Guajén is a part of the ward of Aguada de Moya. Guajen has the CCS of "Julio Antonio Mella".

Guajén shares the name with the Arroyo Guajén (Guajén Stream), located between Jarico and Aguada de Moya.

== History ==
Guajén used to be named "Finca El Guajén" (or "Farm of Guajén" in English) and was a part of the barrio of Aguada de Moya in the former Municipality of Vueltas until 1976. El Guajén used to have the "ingenio Guajén" (Guajén sugarmill) near the Camajuani River.

In 2016, Rafael Santiesteban Pozo, member of the Council of State and national president of the National Association of Small Farmers, organized the 50 year anniversary of the National Association of Small Farmers in CCS "Julio Antonio Mella".

In 2018, Villa Clara was flooded throughout the entire province, in Camajuaní the places that were flooded were El Rincón, Guajén, Sagua la Chica, Macagual, Guerrero, Floridano, Vega Alta, and Vega de Palma.

== Economy ==
According at the DMPF (Departamento de control de la Dirección Municipal de Planificación Física or Management Control Department Municipal Physical Planning in English) of Camajuani, Guajén is a settlement not linked to any source of an economic or job development.

== Infrastructure ==
In Guajén there is the path of Guajén (Camino de Guajén) through the Camajuaní River and heads to Vega Alta and Paso Real.
