= Canoa, Cuba =

Canoa
- Hamlet
- Nickname: La Canoa
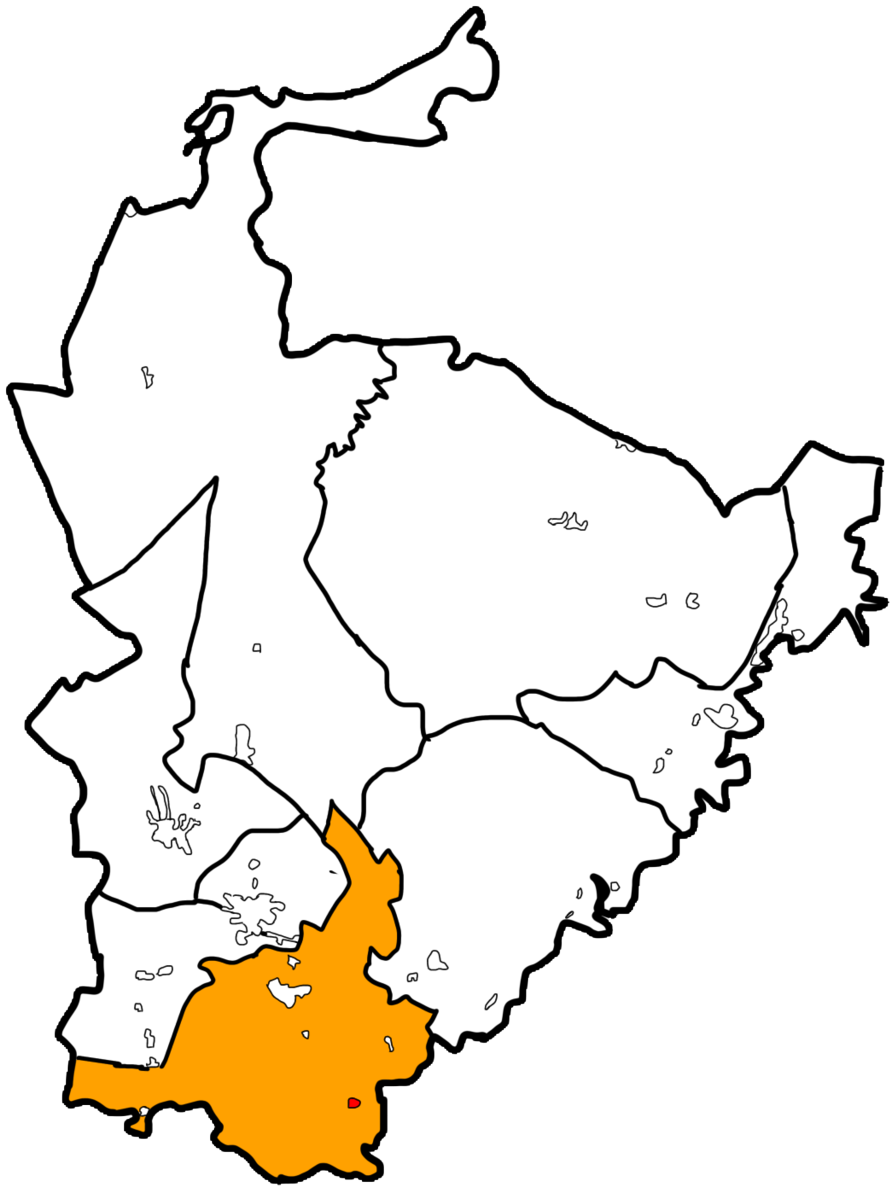
- Canoa (red) in Encrucijada

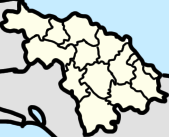
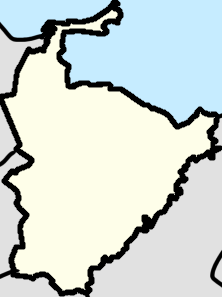
- Location in Cuba Canoa (Villa Clara Province) Canoa (Encrucijada)
- Coordinates: 22°33′29″N 79°49′57″W
- Country: Cuba
- Province: Villa Clara
- Municipality: Encrucijada
- Ward: Constancia

Population (2013)
  - Total: 27

Canoa or La Canoa is a small town in Villa Clara Province, Cuba, in the vicinity of the Sagua la Chica River. Nearby towns include Vega Alta, La Levisa, Chicharón, Paso Real, Santa Ana, La Doncella, and La Catalina. “Canoa” translates to “Canoe” in Spanish and shares the name with Arroyo La Canoa, a stream north of Canoa.

== History ==
The Cuban War of Independence brought great concerns in Camajuaní which is in the border of Canoa. On October 30, 1895. Leoncio Vidal, a Cuban revolutionary with his troops attacked Fort La Vigía in Hills of Santa Fe nearby the Camajuaní, Santa Clara border and he put orders to attack the Canoa Bridge on the Sagua la Chica River and the Tuinicu bridge.

In 1933 Cuban revolutionary Juan Francisco Aro Fernandez was born in Canoa, Cuba.

== Transportation ==
Canoa is on a rail line starting in Santa Clara, going to Crucero Margot, to Luis Arcos Bergnes, Vega Alta, Canoa, Tuinicu, Constancia, Encrucijada, Mata, El Vaquerito, Aguada la Piedra, Cifuentes, San Diego del Valle, Conyedo, and finally back to Santa Clara.

== Culture ==
Jesús Menéndez public library has three video rooms located in Canoa, Progreso, and Castaño for the hamlets cultures.

== See also ==
- La Luz, Cuba
- Aguada de Moya, Cuba
- La Quinta, Cuba
- Luis Arcos Bergnes
