= ANAP =

ANAP may refer to:

- National Association of Small Farmers (Spanish: Asociación Nacional de Agricultores Pequeños, ANAP) in Cuba
- The Motherland Party of Turkey (Turkish: Anavatan Partisi, abbreviated as ANAVATAN and formerly abbreviated as ANAP)
- Alliance Party for the Sake of Azerbaijan (Azerbaijani: Azərbaycan Naminə Alyans Partiyası), a political party in Azerbaijan
- ANAP, the National Agency for Public Procurement in Romania
