= Aguada de Moya, Cuba =

Aguada de Moya
- Village
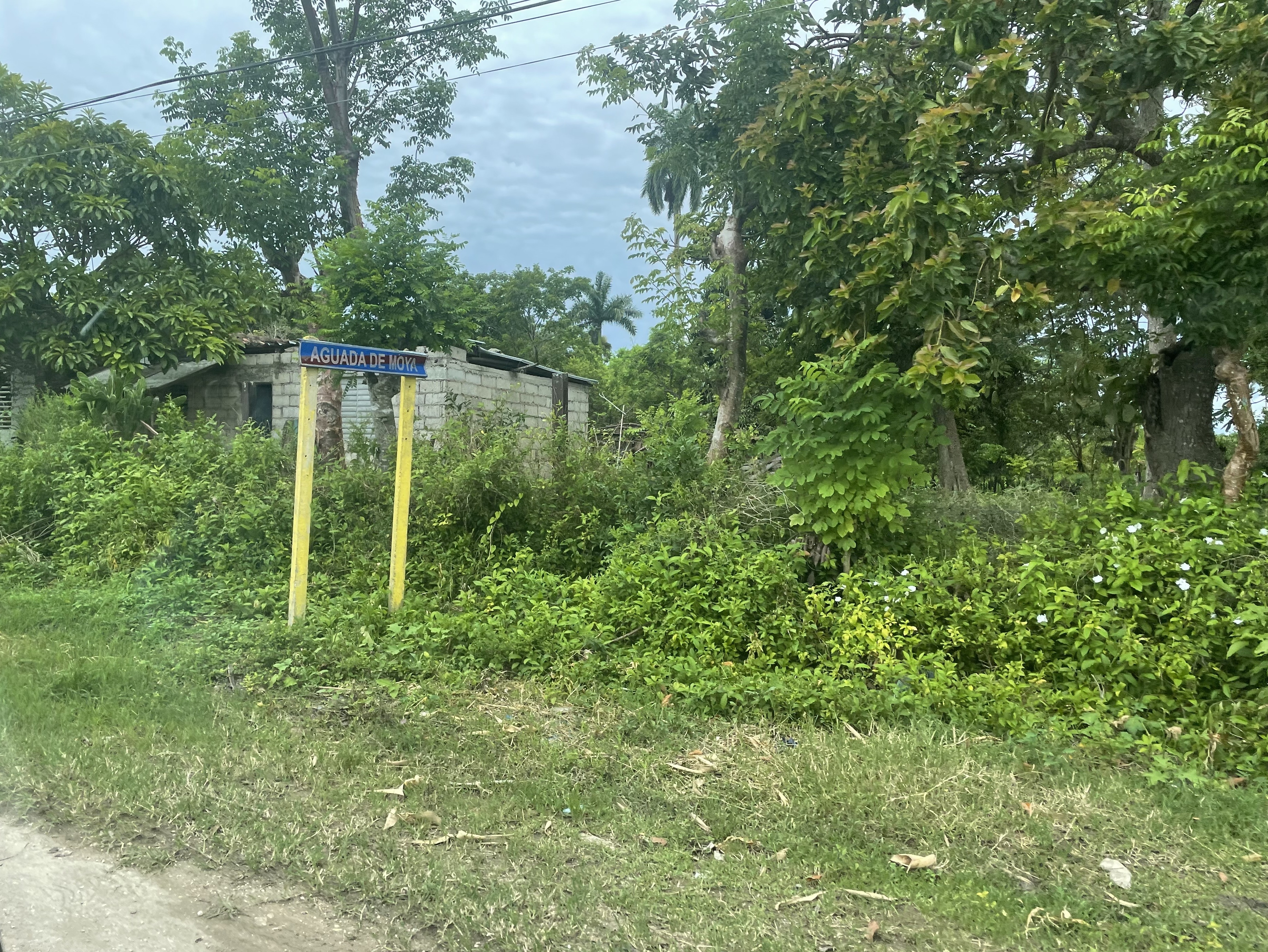
- Sign seen when leaving the town

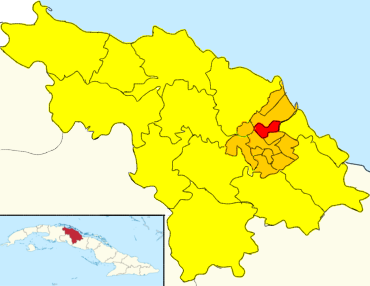
- Map of Aguada de Moya (Red) in Camajuaní (Orange) in Villa Clara (Yellow)

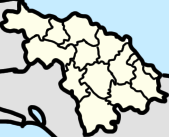
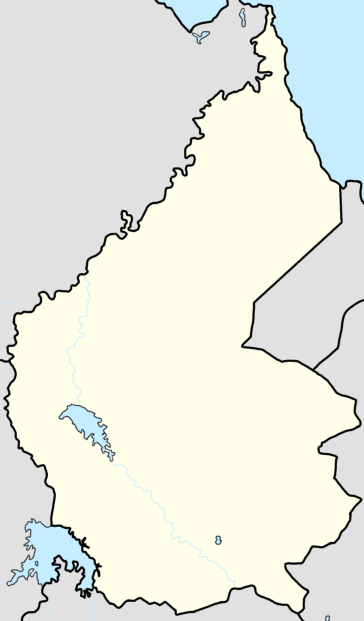
- Where Aguada de Moya is in Cuba Aguada de Moya (Villa Clara Province) Aguada de Moya (Camajuaní)
- Coordinates: 22°32′49″N 79°43′12″W
- Country: Cuba
- Province: Villa Clara
- Municipality: Camajuaní
- Founded: 1793
- Elevation: 43 m (141 ft)

Population
  - Total: 2,967
- Postal code: 52500
- Highways: Circuito Norte

Aguada de Moya is a small town and ward in Camajuaní, Villa Clara, Cuba. The ward borders the municipality of Caibarién, and the wards of San Antonio de las Vueltas, Vega Alta, and Batalla de Santa Clara.

== History ==
=== Barrio ===
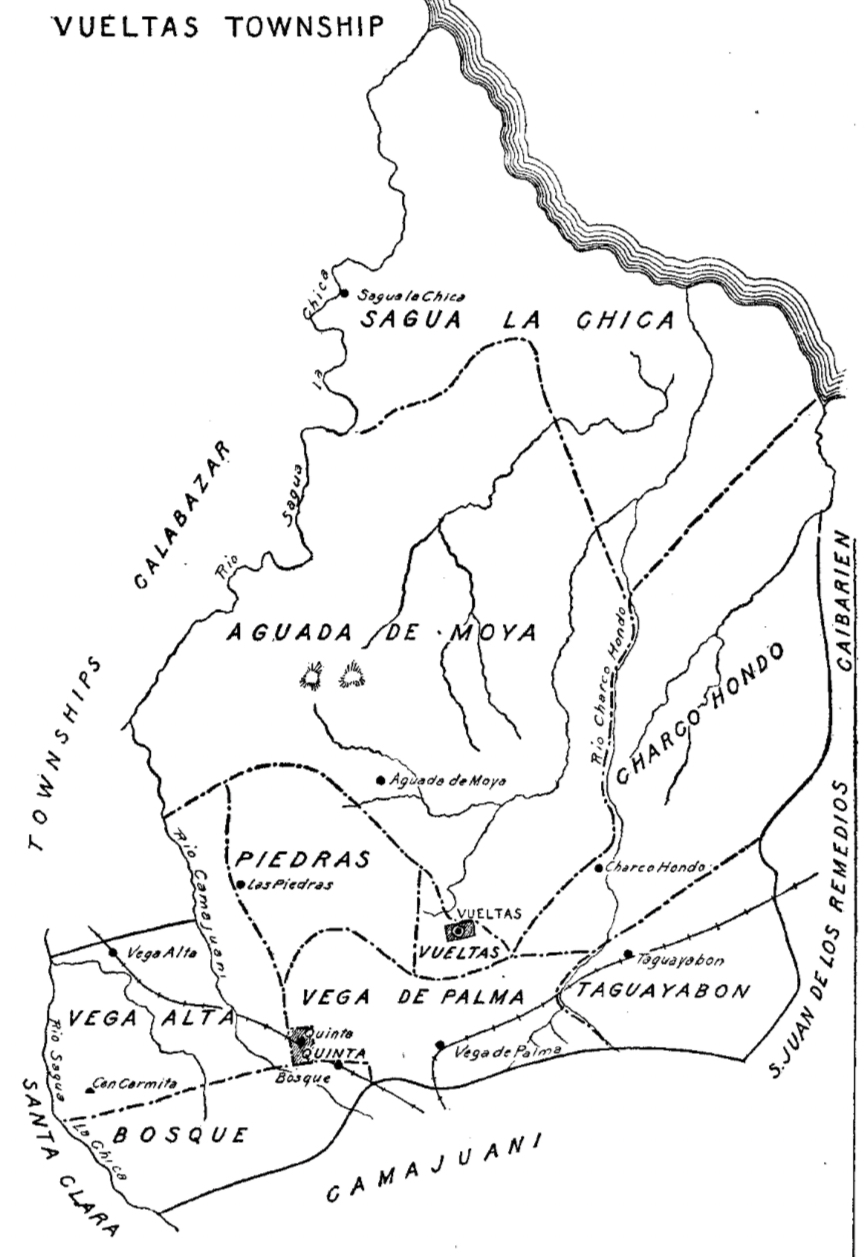
Map of Barrios of Vueltas in 1909

Aguada de Moya used to be a barrio of San Antonio de las Vueltas Municipality until 1976.

==== Places in the Barrio ====
Aguada de Moya’s Barrio includes the town of Guajén (at the time a farm). It also included the farms of Finca Ojo de Agua (Ojo de Agua farm) and Finca Los Hermanos (Los Hermanos Farm).

== Geography ==
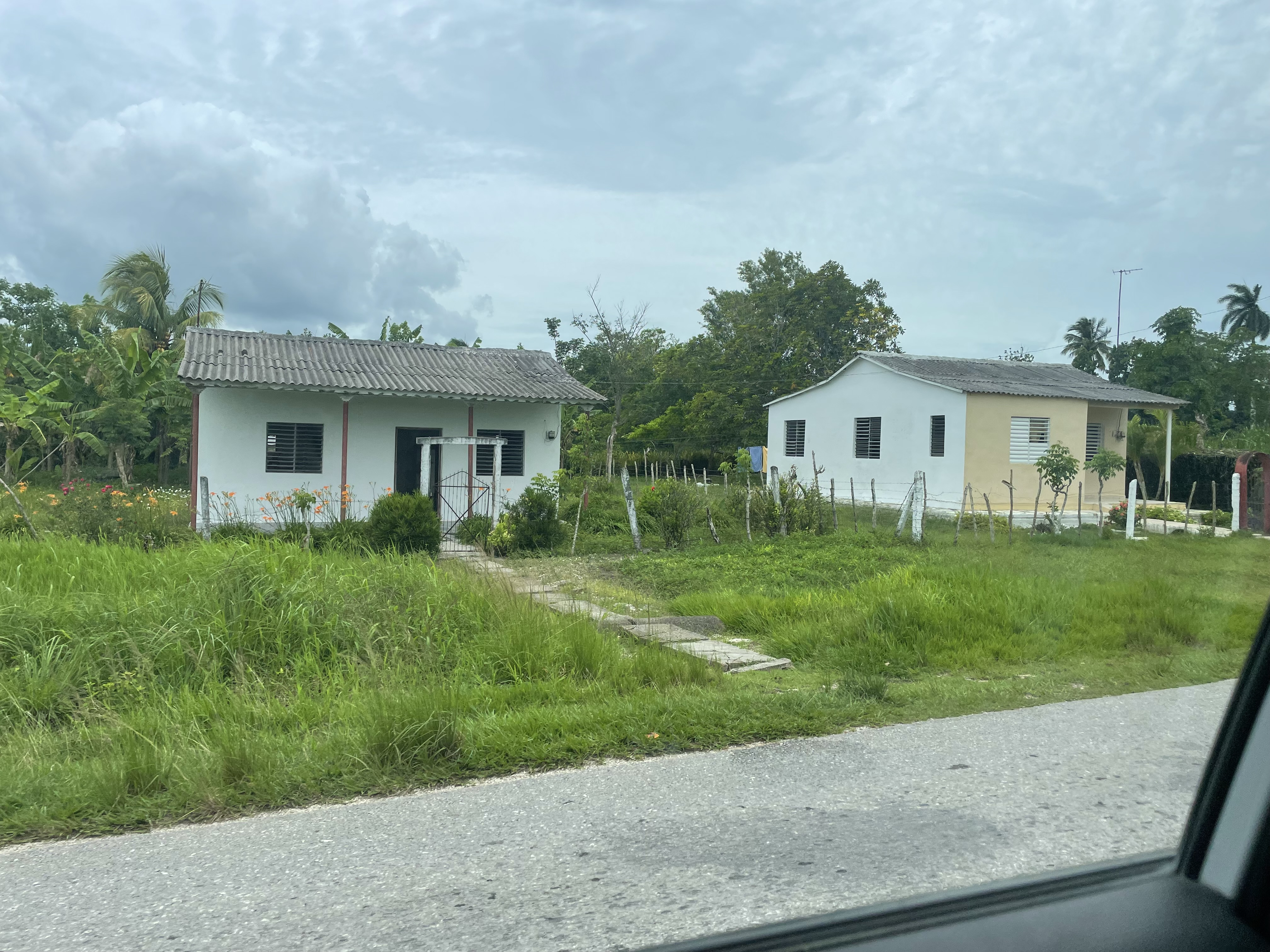
Houses in the Entronque Aguada de Moya

The ward of Aguada de Moya includes the towns and hamlets of:

- Aguada de Moya
- El Purial
- Chorrerón
- Entronque Aguada de Moya
- Ojo de Agua
- Guajén (split with Vega Alta)
- Mochita
- Dolorita

== Education ==
Schools in Aguada de Moya include:

- Isidro Glez Primary (Chorrerón)
- Celestino Pacheco Primary (El Purial)

== Economy ==
According to the DMPF (Departamento de control de la Dirección Municipal de Planificación Física or Management Control Department Municipal Physical Planning in English) of Camajuani, Aguada de Moya is a settlement linked to sources of employment or economic development.

The Provincial Tobacco Company La Estrella has territory in La Quinta, Camajuani, Aguada de Moya, San Antonio de las Vueltas, and Taguayabón.

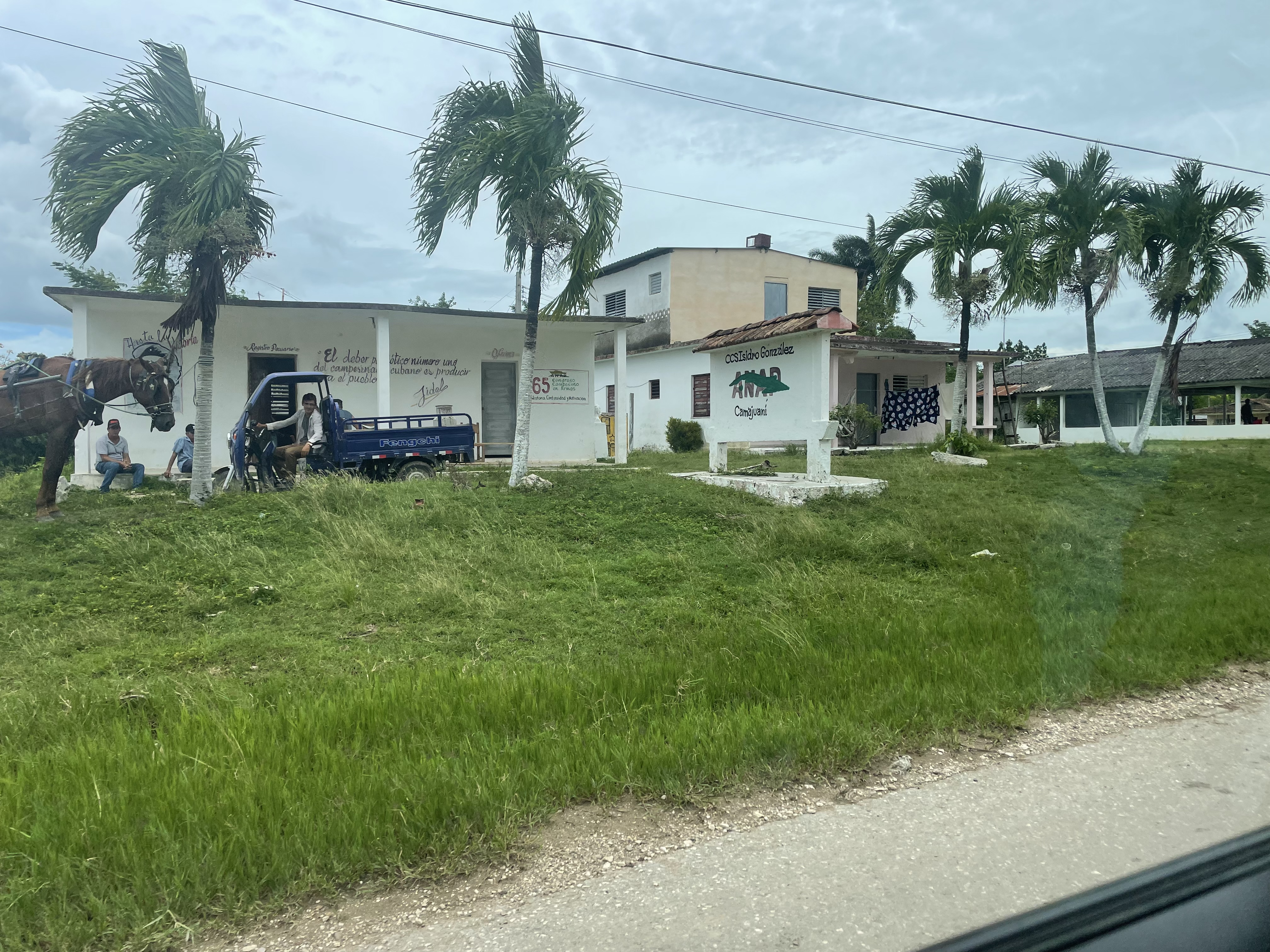
CCS Isidro Gonzalez

Aguada de Moya includes the cooperatives of:

- CPA Juan B. Montes de Oca
- CPA Fructuoso Rodríguez
- CCS Isidro González
- CCS Julio Antonio Mella (in Guajen)
- CCSF Abel Santamaria

== Government ==
Camajuaní has multiple Constituency Delegate (Delegado Circunscripción) for every ward, Aguada de Moya’s ward has:

- Constituency Delegate #33 Yusbyela Peña Orozco
- Constituency Delegate #40 Lázaro González Marrero (of Guajén)
- Constituency Delegate #47 Elkis Emilio Muros
- Constituency Delegate #49 Hildelisa Montero Hernández
- Constituency Delegate #50 Armando León Orozco
- Constituency Delegate #56 Mildrey Ramos Peña

== See also ==
- Santa Clara, Cuba
- Canoa, Cuba
- Luis Arcos Bergnes, Cuba
