= Vega Redonda (Cuba) =

- Hamlet
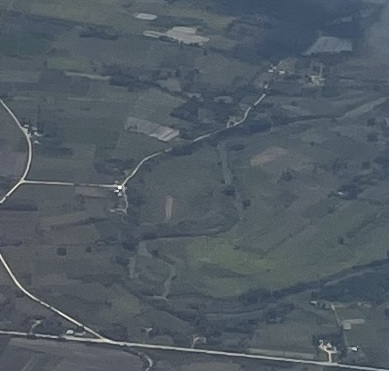
- Vega Redonda with the Sagua la Chica River and the Carretera a El Santo

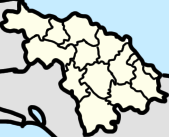
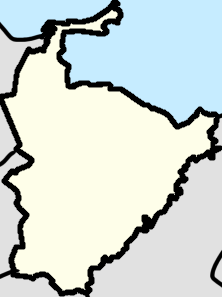
- Location within Cuba Location within Villa Clara Province Location within Encrucijada
- Coordinates: 22°37′34″N 79°44′30″W
- Country: Cuba
- Province: Villa Clara
- Municipality: Encrucijada
- Ward: La Sierra

Vega Redonda is a hamlet in Encrucijada, Cuba.

== Geography ==
Vega Redonda is in the ward of La Sierra. It is also near the Sagua la Chica River.

=== Environmental issues ===
In 2018, a flood from the Sagua la Chica River happened. Vega Redonda, Pavón, El Santo, Siete Pazos and others had a total of a thousand people evacuated, according to Eduardo Monteagudo, President of Encrucijada and Alberto López Díaz, President of Villa Clara Province, making it the most affected towns in Villa Clara.

== History ==
Vega Redonda was a former barrio of Encrucijada.
