= Onelio Jorge Cardoso =

Cuban editor, screenwriter, short fiction writer and party functionary

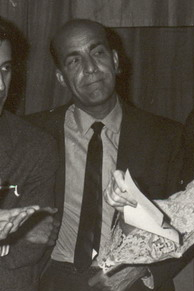
Onelio Jorge Cardoso

Onelio Jorge Cardoso (May 14, 1914 in Calabazar de Sagua, Cuba – May 29, 1986 in Havana, Cuba) was a Cuban editor, screenwriter, short fiction writer and party functionary.

== Biography and career ==
Cardoso was born in Calabazar de Sagua, nearby Encrucijada, Cuba. He was unable to complete his high school studies due to his family's economic problems, employing himself in different trades to support his family. One of these was as a traveling salesman, a job that allowed him to get to know different places and people within Cuba that would serve as models for the setting and characters of several of his stories. He started writing at a young age, winning a short story writing contest in 1936. However, it was not until 1945 when he became known by winning the "Alfonso Hernández Catá" contest with a story entitled "Coalmen" (Los carboneros). In 1945, he published in Mexico his first book, Taita, you tell me how (Taita, diga usted cómo). In 1948, he settled in Havana, working as a news editor in 1010 kHz AM radio station and writing screenplays as well for commercial radio stations. He, furthermore, worked as editor in chief for Cine-Revista newsreel. He was awarded the National Award of Peace for his story "Scrap Iron" (Hierro viejo). He published his second book in 1958, The storyteller (El cuentero).

After the Cuban Revolution, he became Director of the Institute of Music Copyrights, Chief of Special Articles of Granma, and Chief Editor of Pueblo y Cultura and Pionero magazines. He was also a documentary screenwriter for the Cuban Institute of Cinematographic Art and Industry (ICAIC). In 1961, he joined the executive department of the literary section of the Unión Nacional de Escritores y Artistas de Cuba (National Union of Writers and Artists of Cuba - UNEAC).
