= El Purial (Camajuaní) =

Rural hamlet in Cuba

Purial
- Rural Halmet
- El Purial
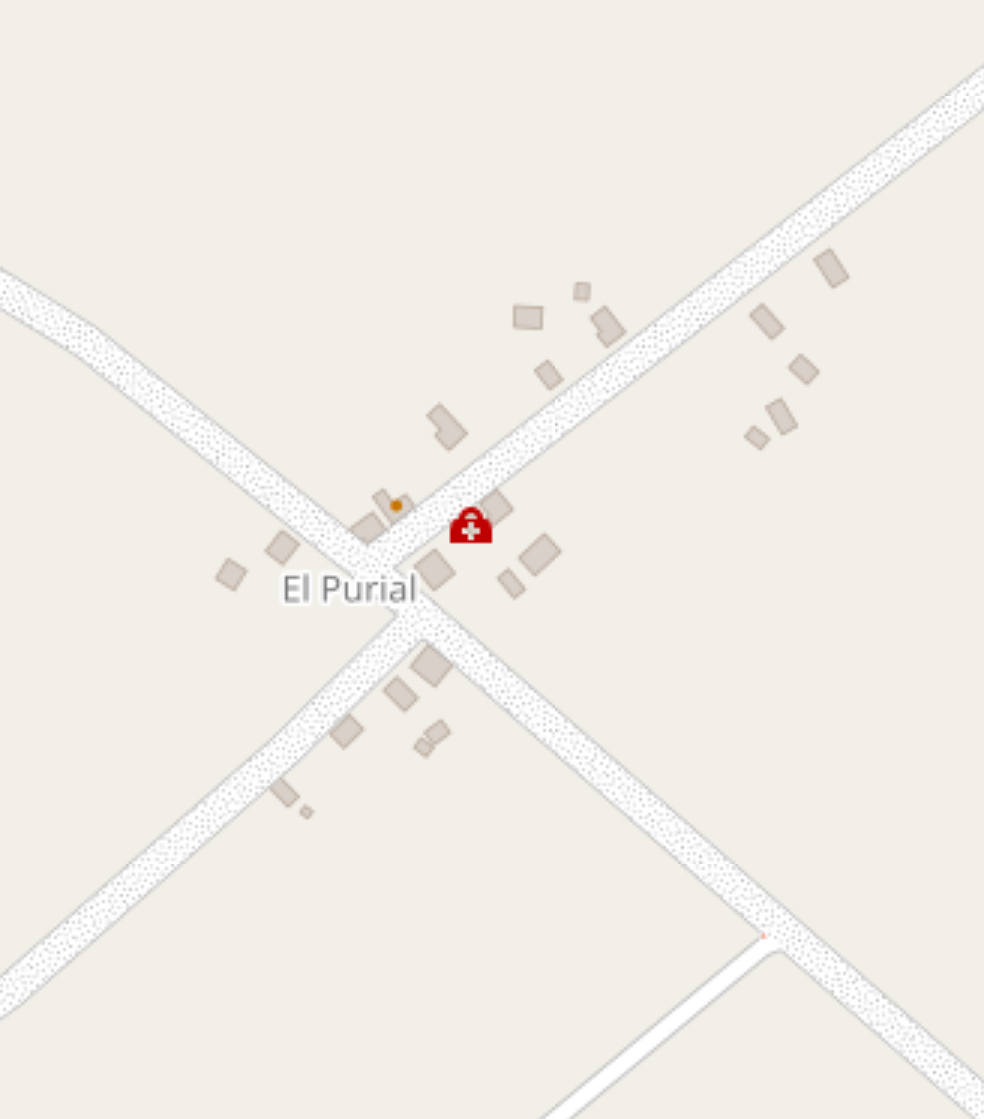
- Map of El Purial

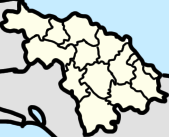
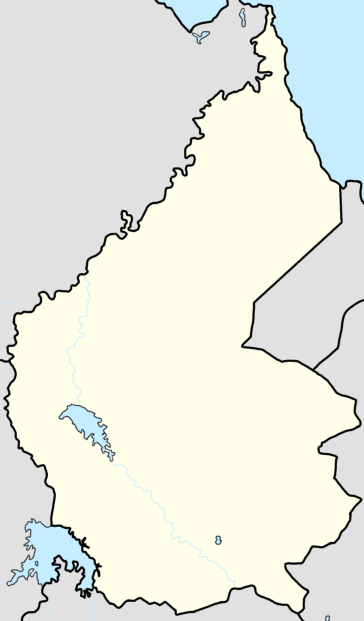
- El Purial in Cuba Purial (Villa Clara Province) Purial (Camajuaní)
- Coordinates: 22°33′05″N 79°44′41″W
- Country: Cuba
- Province: Villa Clara
- Municipality: Camajuaní
- Ward: Aguada de Moya
- Elevation: 129 m (423 ft)

Population
  - Total: 37

El Purial, also known as Purial, is a rural hamlet in the ward of Aguada de Moya, Camajuaní, Villa Clara, Cuba.

South of the town there are hills called Lomas El Purial or Hills El Purial in English.

== Economy ==
According at the DMPF (Departamento de control de la Dirección Municipal de Planificación Física or Management Control Department Municipal Physical Planning in English) of Camajuani, El Purial is a settlement not linked to any source of an economic or job development but still are maintained.

== Transport ==
El Purial is located on the junction of 2 unpaved roads, one heading north than east to Aguada de Moya, and one heading west-east, from El Guajén in the west and the Vueltas Bypass in San Antonio de las Vueltas in the east.

== Town Buildings ==
In El Purial there are a few town buildings. There are 2 schools, they are Leoncio Vidal School, named after the Cuban Revolutionary Leoncio Vidal, and Celestino Pacheco Primary. The hospital in the area is Consultorio Médico 17.
