= La Sierra (Encrucijada) =

- Ward
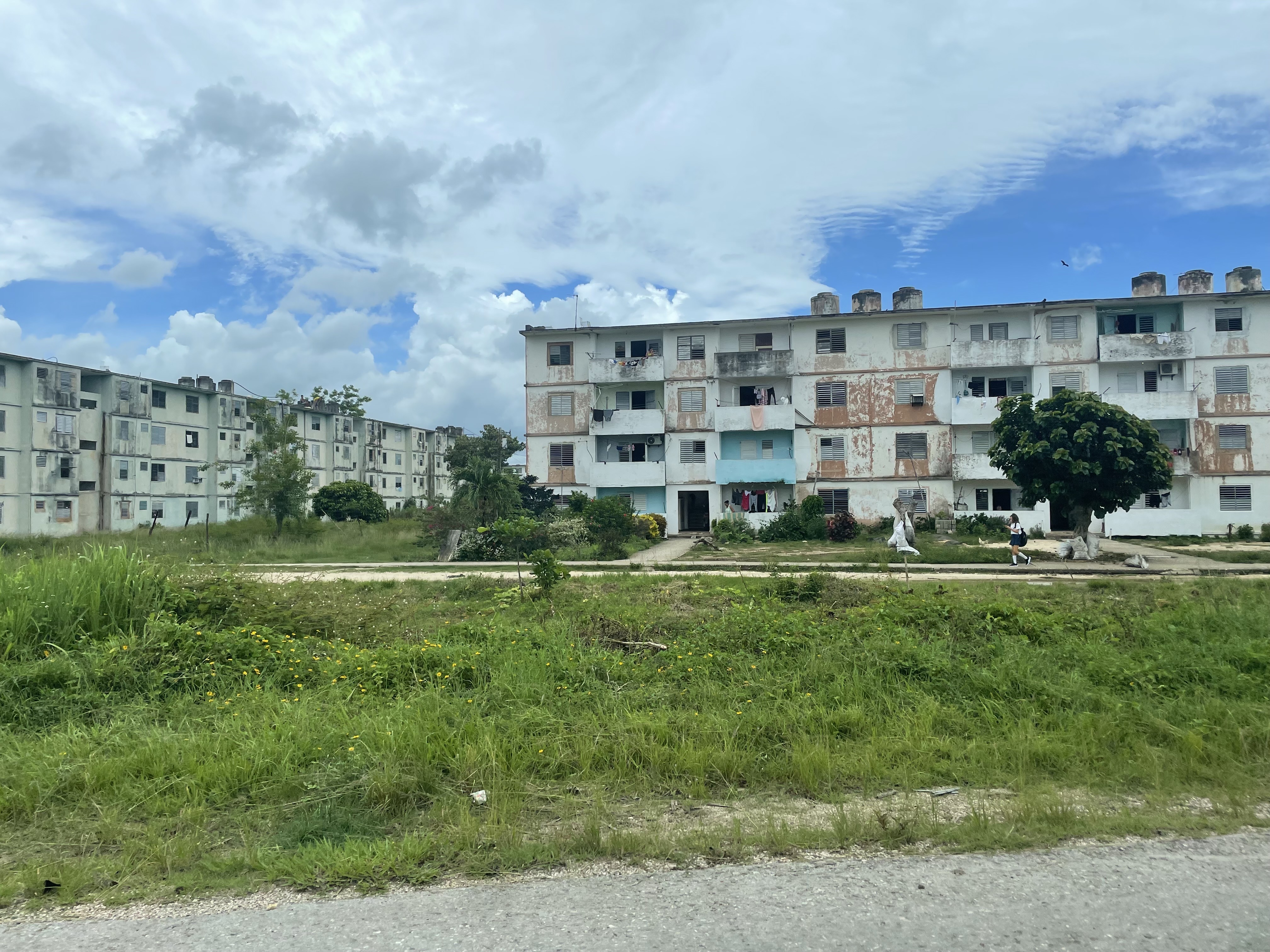
- Apartments in La Sierra seen from the Circuito Norte

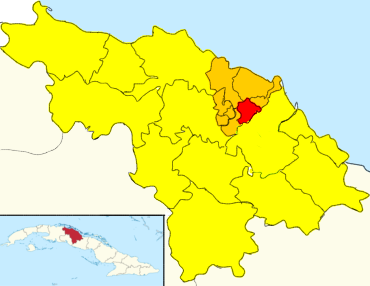
- Map of La Sierra (red) in Encrucijada (orange) in Villa Clara (yellow)

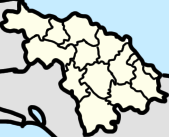
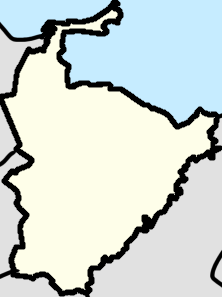
- Location within Cuba Location within Villa Clara Province Location within Encrucijada
- Coordinates: 22°36′11″N 79°48′18″W
- Country: Cuba
- Province: Villa Clara
- Municipality: Encrucijada

Area
  - Total: 0.15 km^{2} (0.058 sq mi)

Population (2012)
  - Total: 1,158
  - Density: 7,700/km^{2} (20,000/sq mi)

La Sierra is an urban settlement and ward in Encrucijada, Cuba.

== Geography ==
Towns in the ward of La Sierra include:

- El Perico
- Las Bocas
- Vega Redonda
- Pavón

=== Environmental issues ===
La Sierra is near the Sagua la Chica River, which has a possible chance to flood, which is a danger to people who live in La Sierra and El Santo. In case this happens there are 21 evacuation centers which are always stocked up with food. Including residents of Pavón, El Santo, Siete Pazos, Vega Redonda, and others in Encrucijada, a total of 1000 people evacuated to the houses of their family and friends, or to the evacuation centers, when it flooded in 2018.

== Education ==
Schools in La Sierra include:

- José Arcadio CM
- Enrique Hart Rural Primary School
- Carlos Manuel de Céspedes Rural Primary School
- Camilo Cienfuegos Rural Primary School
- Perucho Figueredo Rural Primary School

== Government ==
Encrucijada has multiple District Delegate (Delegado de la Circunscripción) for every ward, La Sierra’s ward has:

- District Delegate No 39 Grisela Alonso Consuegra
- District Delegate No 40 Mislandy Martínez Consuegra
- District Delegate No 41 Lisbán González Chirino
- District Delegate No 42 Reinier Guevara Hernández
- District Delegate No 58 Osmany Broche Vega
