= Cayo Hueso, Encrucijada =

UBPC in Cuba

Cayo Hueso
- Hamlet
- UBPC Cayo Hueso
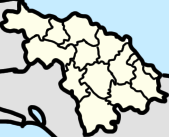
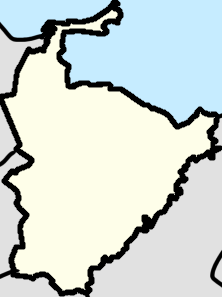
- Location in Cuba Cayo Hueso (Villa Clara Province) Cayo Hueso (Encrucijada)
- Coordinates: 22°36′13.8654″N 79°51′11.4739″W
- Country: Cuba
- Province: Villa Clara
- Municipality: Encrucijada
- Ward: Constancia

Population (2013)
  - Total: 279

Cayo Hueso is a hamlet, a UBPC, and the 48th zone of the ward of Abel Santamaria in Encrucijada, Cuba.

== Human resources ==
=== Public health ===
In Cayo Hueso there is a nursing home named "Corazón adentro", that translates into English as "Heart Within".

== Government ==
=== Provincial representation ===
Modesto García Bermúdez, general director of the Sagüera entity of the Villa Clara Province, said and explained how she would get raw sugar cane materials to the reception and cleaning centers in Cayo Hueso from Abel Santamaria and other places in Cuba.

== Production ==
The agricultural areas and the collection center of Cayo Hueso and they make 18,366 tons of sugar. The sugar goes to areas in the region including Camajuani. Cayo Hueso has a collection center of the "Abel Santamaría" Sugar Company, which is proposed to package cane straw for fuel and animal feed. The UBPC of Cayo Hueso owns lands in El Mosquito, west of the main town of Cayo Hueso.
