= Encrucijada Norte =

- Ward
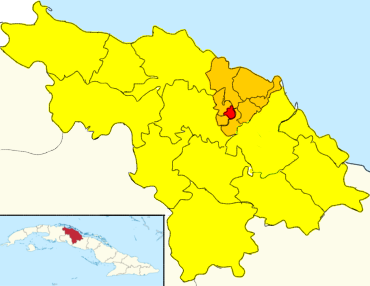
- Encrucijada Norte (red) in Encrucijada (orange) in Villa Clara (yellow)

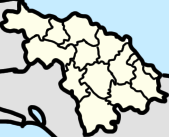
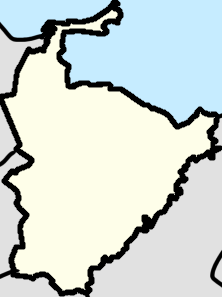
- Location within Cuba Location within Villa Clara Province Location within Encrucijada
- Coordinates: 22°37′15″N 79°51′47″W
- Country: Cuba
- Province: Villa Clara
- Municipality: Encrucijada
- Incorporated as a ward: 1988

Government
  - President: Emilia Margarita Ruiz Ruiz

Encrucijada Norte is a ward (consejo popular) in Encrucijada, Cuba.

== Geography ==
Towns in Encrucijada Norte include:

- Triunvirato
- Encrucijada (northern part)

== Government ==
Encrucijada has multiple District Delegate (Delegado de la Circunscripción) for every ward, Encrucijada Norte's ward has:

- District Delegate No 1 Pablo Morales Quintana
- District Delegate No 2 Iván Luján Gutiérrez
- District Delegate No 3 Margarita Ruíz Ruíz
- District Delegate No 5 María Teresa Jiménez Reyes
- District Delegate No 6 Dianelis Roque Bello
- District Delegate No 23 Hugo Hernández Pazos
- District Delegate No 26 Eduardo Alberto Monteagudo Martín
- District Delegate No 29 Mercedes Ríos Abreu
- District Delegate No 31 Yoel Romero Calderón
- District Delegate No 33 Jorge Armando Rodríguez González
- District Delegate No 50 Jesús Días Molina

The President of the ward is Emilia Margarita Ruiz Ruiz.

== Education ==
Schools in Encrucijada Norte include:

- Abel Santamaría Secondary School
- Protesta de Baraguá IPE
- Roberto Coco Peredo Primary School
- Miguel Diosdado Pérez Primary School
- Manzanita Preschool
