= Cifuentes, Cuba =

Cifuentes
- Municipality
- Cifuentes Bajare
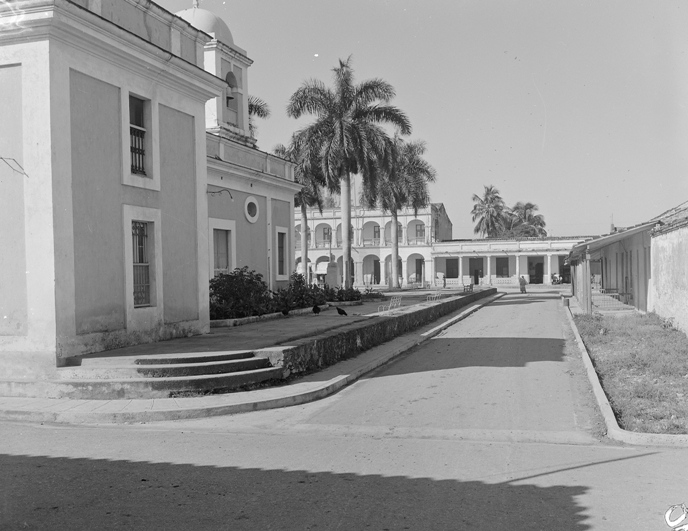
- Calle Maceo of Cifuentes in 1947

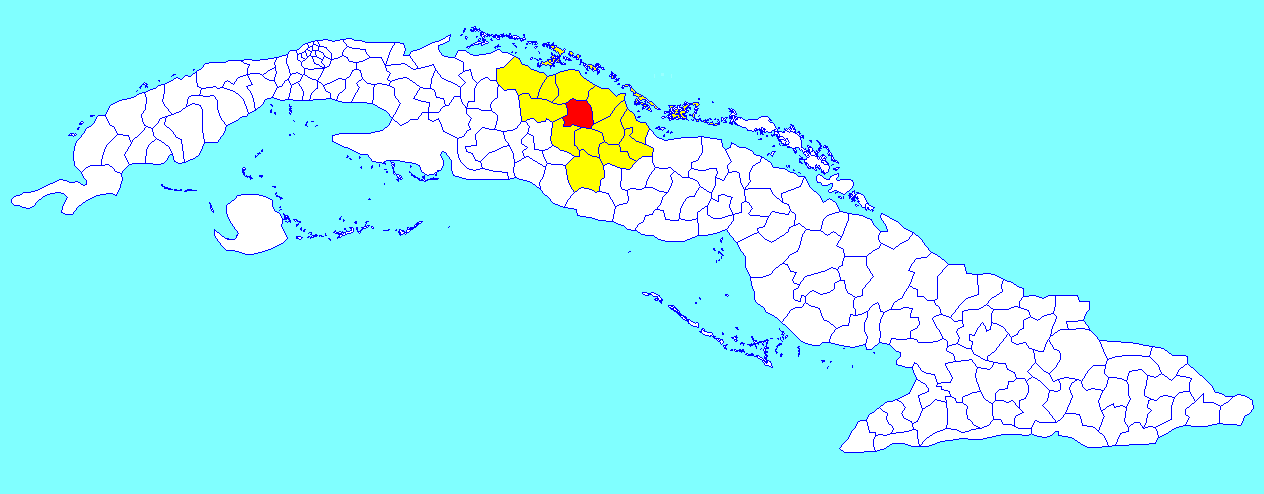
- Cifuentes municipality (red) within Villa Clara Province (yellow) and Cuba
- Coordinates: 22°37′15″N 80°03′58″W
- Country: Cuba
- Province: Villa Clara
- Founded: 1819
- Established: 1919 (Municipality)

Area
  - Total: 512 km^{2} (198 sq mi)
- Elevation: 65 m (213 ft)

Population (2022)
  - Total: 26,135
  - Density: 51.0/km^{2} (132/sq mi)
- Time zone: UTC-5 (EST)
- Area code: +53-422

Cifuentes (Spanish pronunciation: [siˈfwentes]) is a municipality and town in the Villa Clara Province of Cuba founded in 1819 and established as a municipality in 1919.

== Demographics ==
In 2022 the municipality of Cifuentes had a population of 26,135, having dropped from 41,789 in 1976. With a total area of 512 km^{2} (198 sq mi), it had a population density of 51/km^{2} (130/sq mi).

== History ==
The municipality was divided into the barrios of Alacrán, Amaro, Barro, Cabecera Norte, Cabecera Sur, Este, Oeste and Sitio Grande until 1976.

== Transportation ==
Cifuentes is on a rail line starting in Santa Clara, going to Crucero Margot, to Luis Arcos Bergnes, Vega Alta, Canoa, Tuinicu, Constancia, Encrucijada, Mata, El Vaquerito, Aguada la Piedra, Cifuentes, San Diego del Valle, Conyedo, and finally back to Santa Clara.

== See also ==
- Municipalities of Cuba
- List of cities in Cuba
