= El Santo (Cuba) =

- Ward
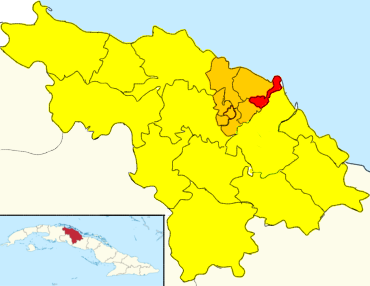
- El Santo (red) in Encrucijada (orange) in Villa Clara (yellow)

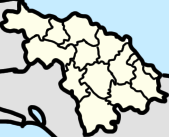
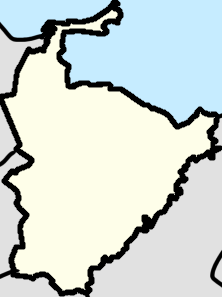
- Location within Cuba Location within Villa Clara Province Location within Encrucijada
- Coordinates: 22°42′31″N 79°41′07″W
- Country: Cuba
- Province: Villa Clara
- Municipality: Encrucijada

Area
  - Total: 1.144 km^{2} (0.442 sq mi)

Population (2012)
  - Total: 2,787
  - Density: 2,436/km^{2} (6,310/sq mi)

El Santo is a ward (consejo popular) in Encrucijada, Cuba.

== Geography ==
Towns inside of the ward include:

- Arroyo Naranjo

=== Environmental issues ===
El Santo is near the Sagua la Chica River, which has a possible chance to flood, making danger to people who live in the wards of La Sierra and El Santo. In case this happens, there are 21 evacuation centers which are always stocked up with food.

In 2018, a flood from the Sagua la Chica River happened. Vega Redonda, Pavón, El Santo, Siete Pazos and others had a total of a thousand people evacuated, according to Eduardo Monteagudo, President of Encrucijada and Alberto López Díaz, President of Villa Clara Province, making it the most affected towns in Villa Clara.

In 2012, there was another flood in El Santo and Jibacoa, these are a result of the dams on La Quinta Lake and Minerva Lake. Tierra Fría and Embarcadero, close to El Santo, were the most threatened by flooding.

== History ==
El Santo was a former barrio of Encrucijada.

== Culture ==
The absent Santeño (El Santeño ausente) was a holiday celebrated from 1952 to 1959 in El Santo, later reformed in 1979. Activities that are done out are the pilgrimage to the tomb of the veterans of the Cuban War of Independence, homage to the old masters, events on the Sagua la Chica River, popular dances, congas outings, fireworks, and offering foods and drinks. The Parrandas are also celebrated in El Santo.
