= Paso Real (Encrucijada) =

- Hamlet
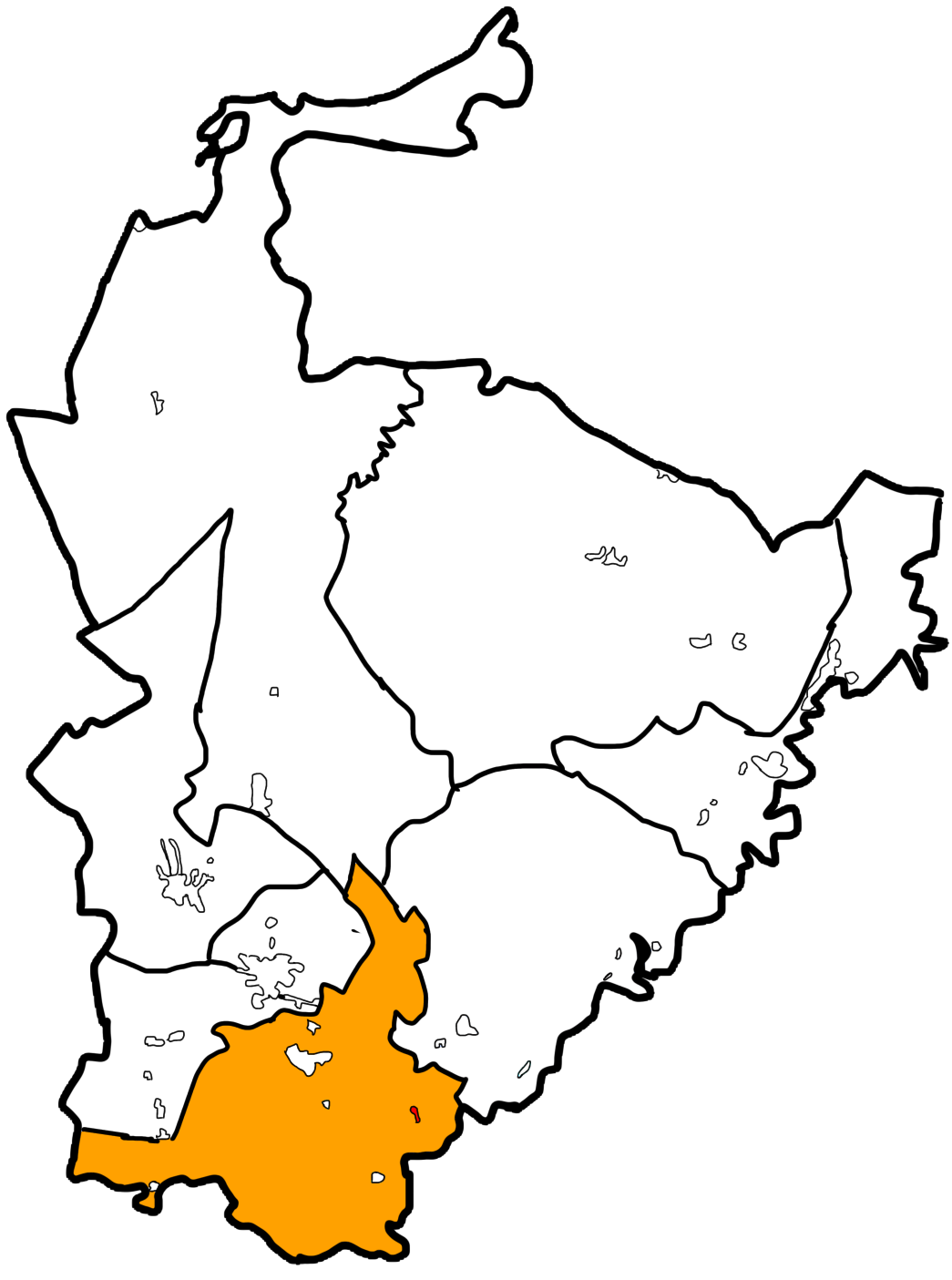
- Paso Real (red) in Abel Santamaria (orange) in Encrucijada

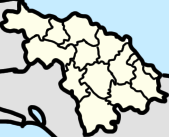
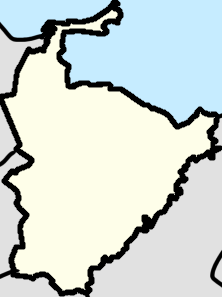
- Location in Cuba Paso Real (Villa Clara Province) Paso Real (Encrucijada)
- Coordinates: 22°34′37″N 79°49′10″W
- Country: Cuba
- Province: Villa Clara
- Municipality: Encrucijada
- Ward: Constancia

Population (2013)
  - Total: 117

Paso Real is a hamlet in Encrucijada, Cuba.

== History ==
In March 1896 during the Cuban Revolution, general Jose Larcet Morlot went to Encrucijada, the Sagua la Chica River, Paso Real, and the Tunicú River. To later enter Santa Clara, Vega Alta, and Calabazar de Sagua.

Paso Real used to be one of four barrios of Encrucijada, which increased to 8 in 1952. Later barrios where only for the main city of Encrucijada and Paso Real was made into the ward of Abel Santamaria, formerly known as Constancia.

In 1941 Encrucijada's official borders where set as where the towns of Encrucijada, El Santo, and Paso Real.

== Economy ==
The productive pole of Paso Real was made by the Plenary of the Municipal Committee of the Party in Encrucijada, which said the hamlet has food problems, market problems, problems about prices, and has bad uses of land. Amaury Fabelo González, first secretary of the Party thought of a change of Paso Real's food production because it was a big problem for people living in Encrucijada, by saying "People must become aware and through the exchange reach the sensitivity of each one to lower the prices of the products" referring to how the municipality must need strategies to solve these problems. Also with prices are going up, 1 pound of food is about 4 pesos. ($0.17 in USD)

The loss of food production has caused Encrucijada to mostly be self-sufficient, mostly without help from the rest of the municipality and mostly or the rest of Cuba.

== Transportation ==
on Mondays to Fridays a bus goes from Encrucijada to Paso Real at 6:30am and 5:10pm.
