= Encrucijada Sur =

Ward in Encrucijada

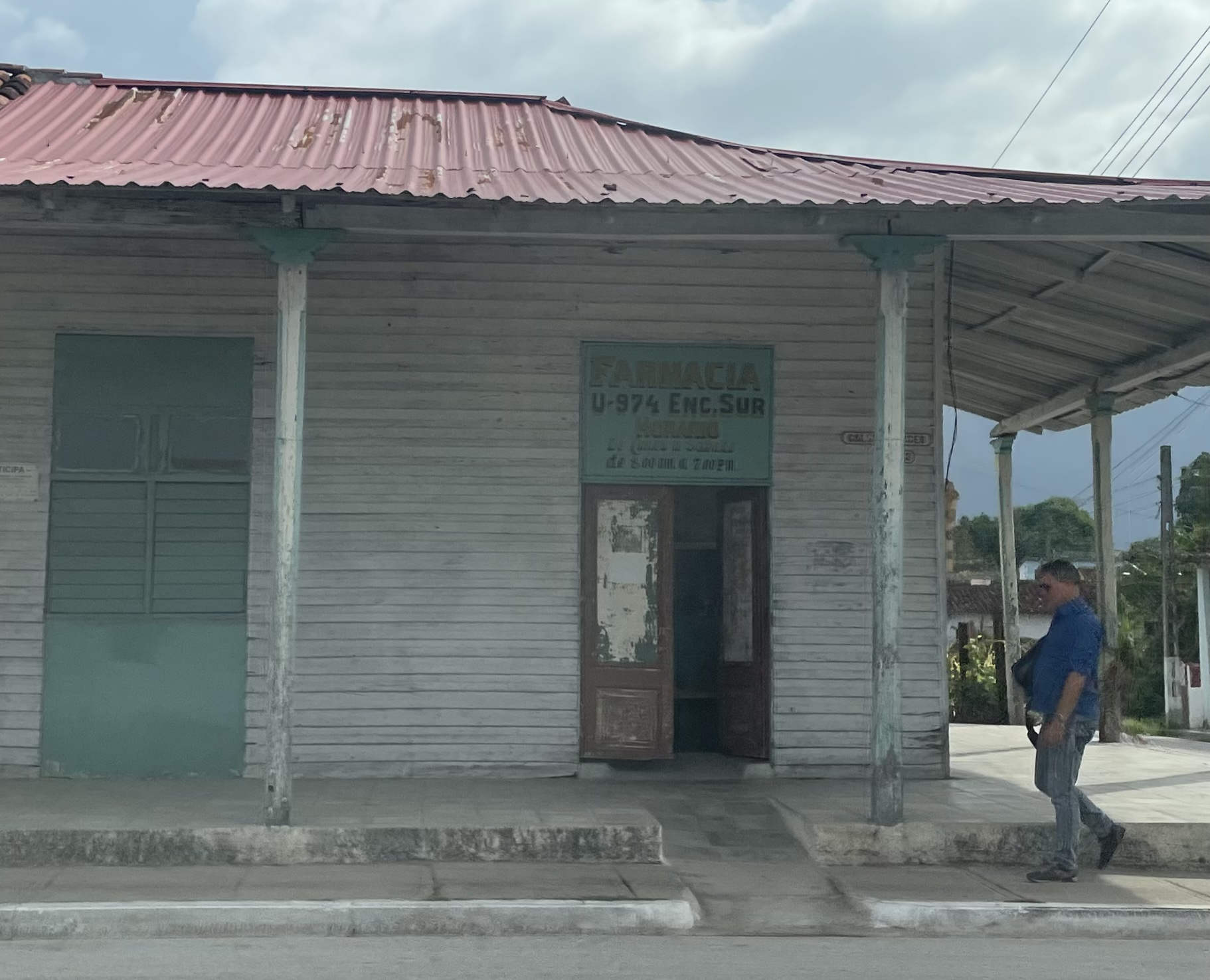
The Encrucijada Sur Pharmacy

Encrucijada Sur is a consejo popular (ward) in Encrucijada, Villa Clara Province, Cuba.

== Geography ==
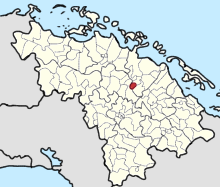
Encrucijada Sur map in Villa Clara Province

Encrucijada Sur includes the barrios of:

- Los Edificios
- Obrero

== Politics ==
The president of Encrucijada Sur is Aurelio Mesa Sáez.

Delegado de la Circunscripción of Encrucijada Sur include:

- Pedro Rodríguez Campos (#4 of Encrucijada)
- Elena Casanova Aranguren (#7)
- Pedro León Monteagudo (#8)
- Milagros Madelaine Noa Toriza (#9)
- Alejandro Álvarez Mollinea (#35)
- Raquel García Acosta (#51)
