= National Association of Small Farmers =

Cuban cooperative federation

- Logo of the organization

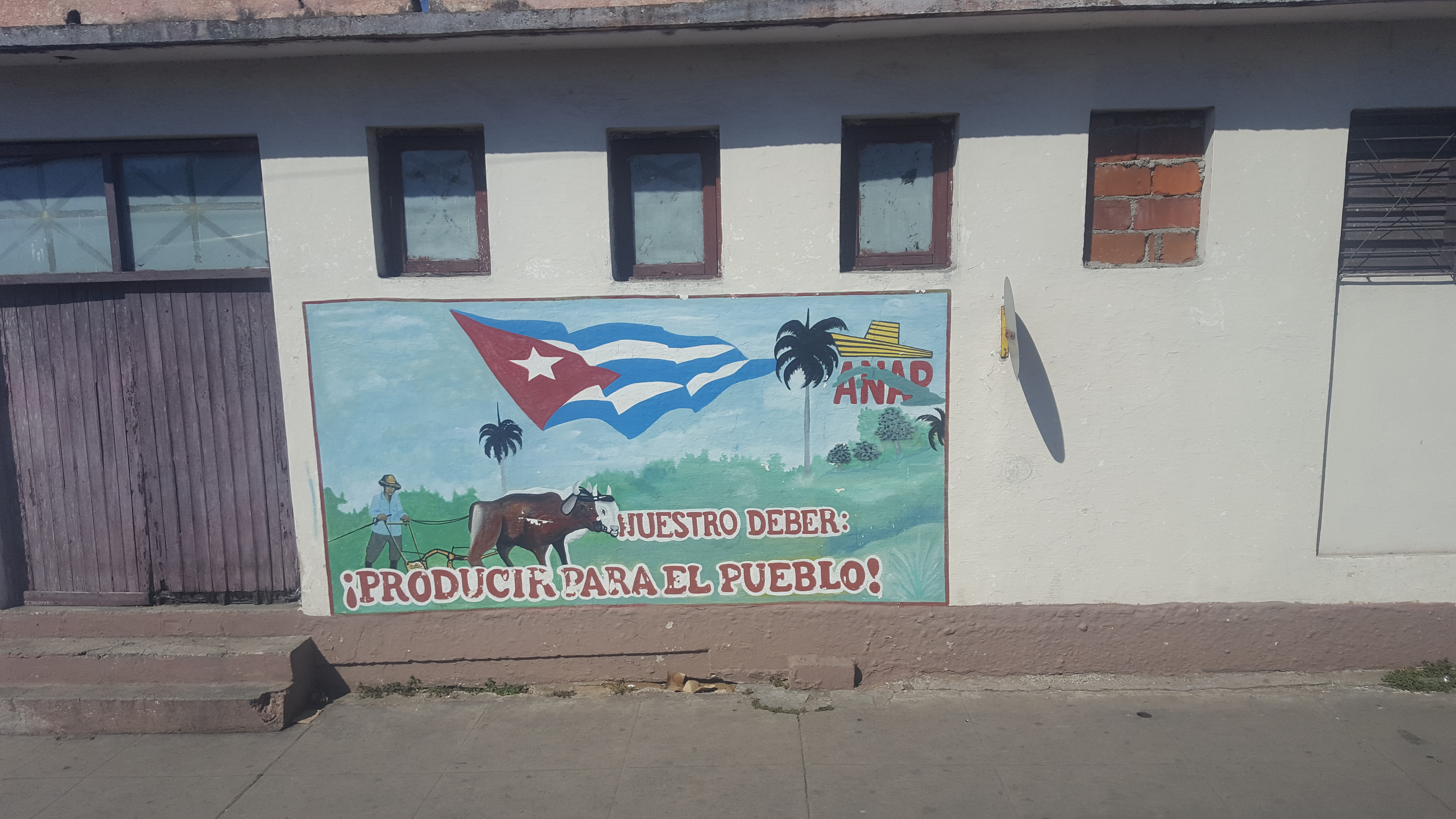
- Promotional mural of ANAP in Cienfuegos
- Abbreviation: ANAP
- Formation: 1961
- Type: NGO
- Purpose: Agriculture
- Members: 331,874
- Official language: Spanish
- President: Rafael Ramón Santiesteban Pozo (since 2014).

The National Association of Small Farmers (ANAP) (Spanish: Asociación Nacional de Agricultores Pequeños) is a cooperative federation dedicated to promoting the interests of small farmers in Cuba. ANAP has over 300,000 members.

== History ==
ANAP was formed in 1961 and its membership was limited to farmers whose land holdings were less than 67 hectares. The Cuban government supported ANAP by providing interest-free loans to its members. Second Agrarian Reform Law of October 1963, introduced the State control over medium and large (over 67 hectares) agricultural estates. While medium and large farms accounting 11.4 million hectares of land were put under control of the newly created State-controlled National Land Reform Institute (INRA), small farmers, owning 7.2 million hectares of land, were organized in ANAP association.

In 1966 together with the Federation of Cuban Women (FMC) the FMC-ANAP Mutual Aid Brigades were established aiming to help rural women become more economically active outside the home. FMC-ANAP brigades increased available rural labour force at critical moments in the agricultural cycle, and were instrumental in the campaign to increase the sugarcane harvest in Cuba

In 1977 ANAP supported the gradual transformation of the private sector. Individual farmers were endorsed to voluntarily join production co-operatives. By 1987 co-operative farms were accounting for 63% of private land holdings. Altogether 1,400 co-operative farms had 68,000 co-operative members.

Currently ANAP members produce 52% of the vegetables, 67% of the corn, and 85% of the tobacco grown in Cuba

== Activities ==
ANAP provides training, agricultural extension and other services to its members. Federation often negotiates with Cuban government on prices of agricultural production, credits, and other farmers' interests.

Rafael Santiesteban Pozo, member of the Council of State and national president of the peasant organization organized the 50 year anniversary of the National Association of Small Farmers in CCS "Julio Antonio Mella", which is in Guajén, Villa Clara. It aimed at invigorating the contribution of the membership in meat, milk, root vegetables, vegetables, and other products which are in high demand by the population.

Internationally ANAP cooperates with NGOs, mainly from Canada and Europe. In 1995 the Cuban Organic Agriculture Exchange Program was started in cooperation with the US organization the Institute for Food and Development Policy.

== See also ==
Agriculture in Cuba
