= Sagua la Chica River =

River in Cuba

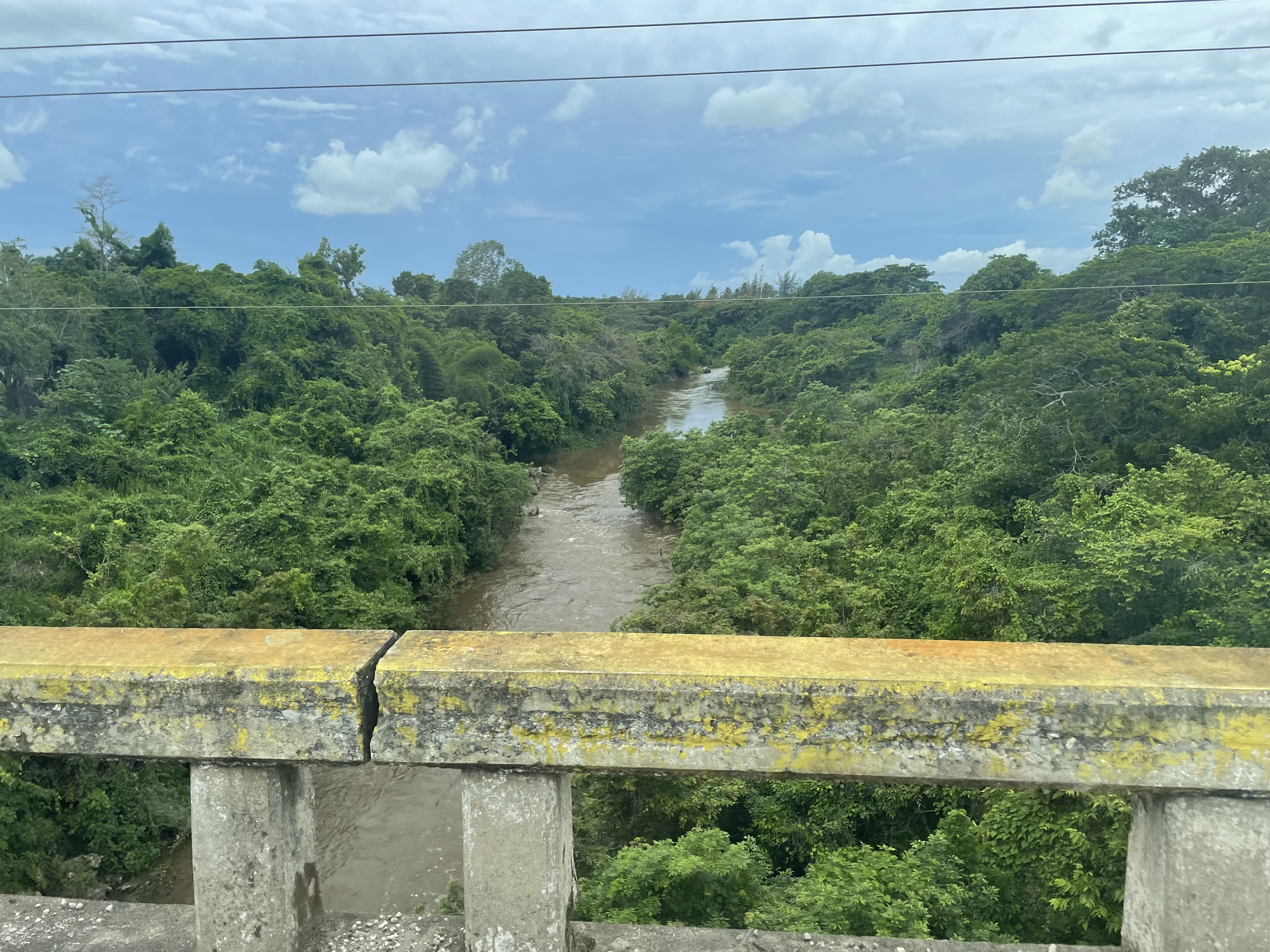
The Sagua la Chica River on the Circuito Norte

Sagua la Chica River is a river of northern Cuba, that flows through Villa Clara Province. Arising in the hills of Placetas, it flows north for 45 miles and empties into the Bay of Buena Vista. The River sets the border of Camajuaní with Encrucijada and Camajuaní with Santa Clara

== Villages ==
Towns and villages near the Sauga la Chica include:

- Falcón
- El Berro
- Crucero Carmita
- Luis Arcos Bergnes (or Carmita)
- Vega Alta
- Canoa (or La Canoa)
- Rincón (or El Rincón)
- El Perico (or Perico)
- Pavón
- Las Bocas
- Vega Redonda
- Arroyo Naranjo
- Sagua la Chica (town)
- El Santo

== See also ==
- Sagua la Grande River
- List of rivers of Cuba
