= Luis Arcos Bergnes, Cuba =

Carmita
- Ward
- Luis Arcos Bergnes
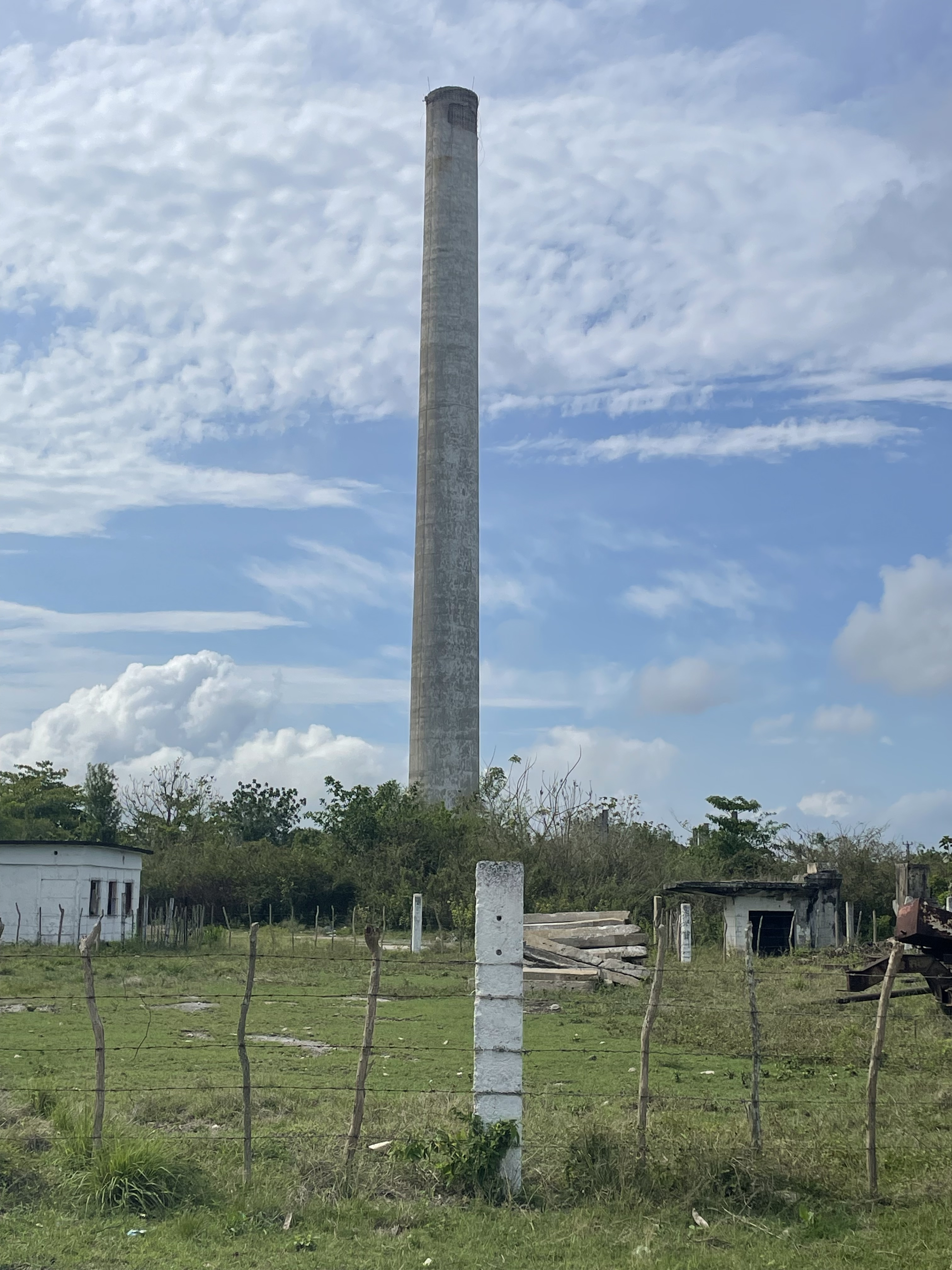
- the CAI of Luis Arcos Bergnes

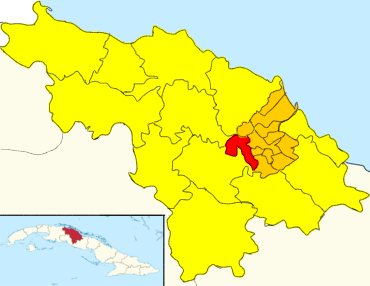
- Map of Carmita (Red) in Camajuaní (Orange) in Villa Clara (Yellow)

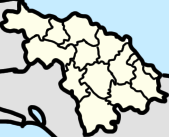
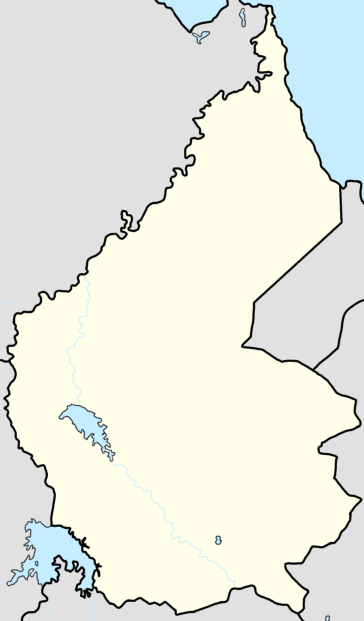
- Where Carmita is in Cuba Carmita (Villa Clara Province) Carmita (Camajuaní)
- Coordinates: 22°30′18″N 79°48′57″W
- Country: Cuba
- Province: Villa Clara
- Municipality: Camajuani
- Named for: Luis Arcos Bergnes (brother of Sebastian Arcos Bergnes)

Government
  - President: Martín Sánchez Rodríguez (Non-partisan)

Population
  - Total: 2,279

Luis Arcos Bergnes also known as Carmita is a small town and a ward (consejo popular) in Camajuani, Villa Clara, Cuba. With a population of 2,279 it is considered a village.

Nearby towns of Carmita are La Luz, Corona, El Cubano, Romano, La Mano, and Vega Alta.

== Geography ==
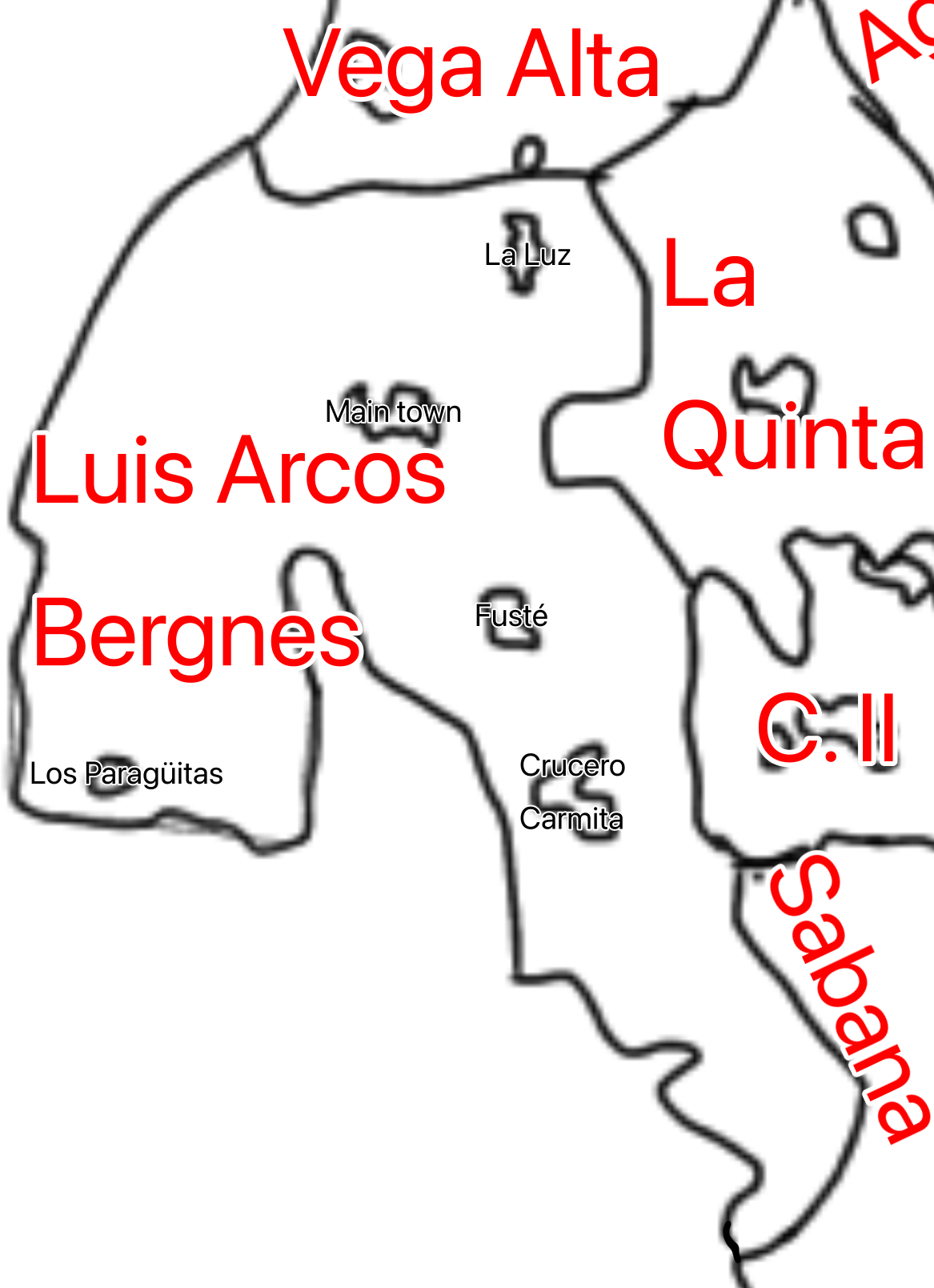
Map of the Ward of Luis Arcos Bergnes

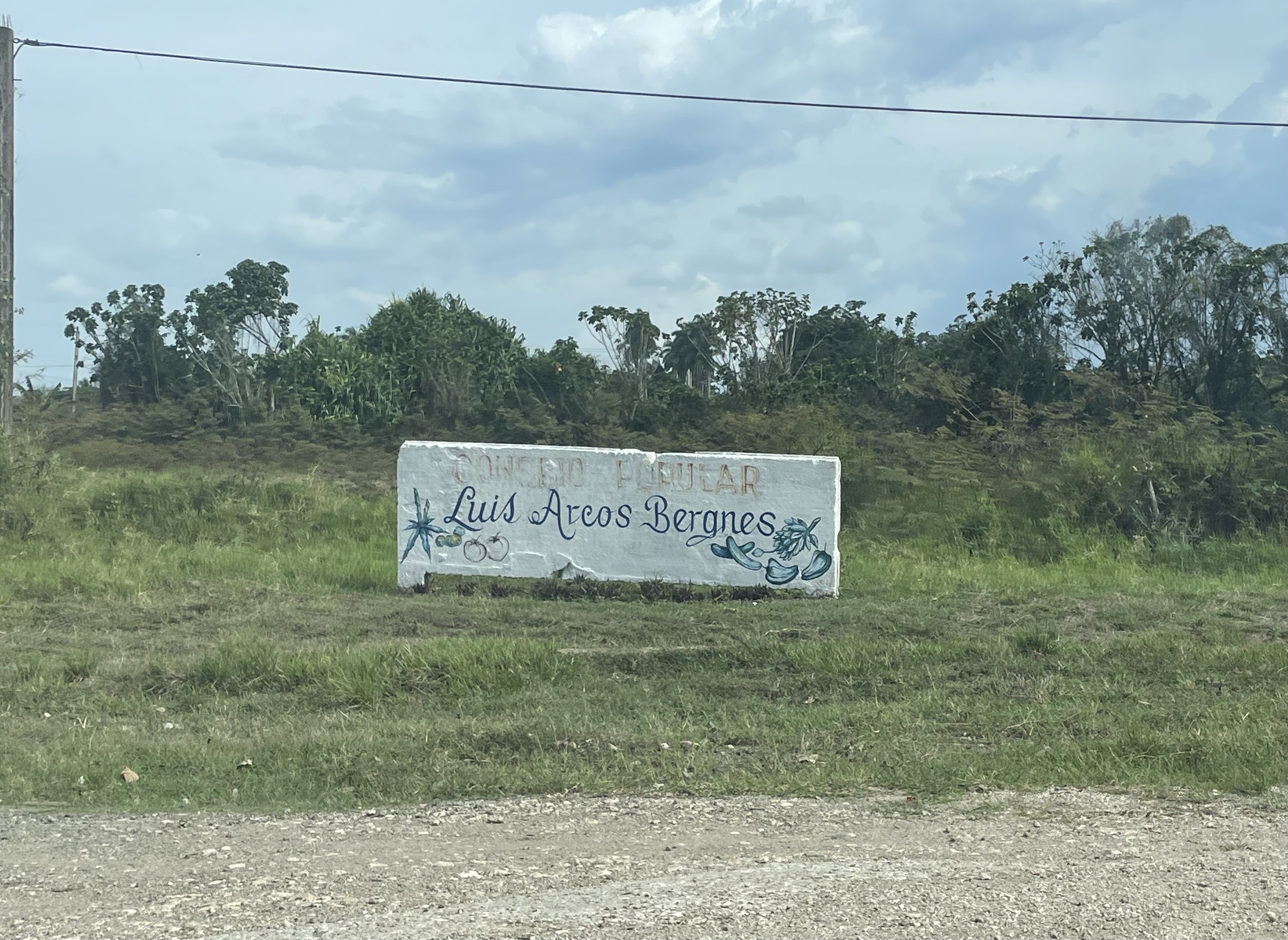
Sign stating the entrance of the Ward

Wards of Cuba are a local body of a town and some towns nearby. Towns in Luis Arcos Bergnes’ ward include

- La Luz
- Fusté
- Crucero Carmita
  - Reparto Viejo
  - Reparto Nuevo
- El Charco
- Pueblo Nuevo
- Batey Viejo
- San Pedro
- San Lorenzo
- Corona

== Economy ==
According at the DMPF (Departamento de control de la Dirección Municipal de Planificación Física or Management Control Department Municipal Physical Planning in English) of Camajuani, Luis Arcos Bergnes is a settlement linked to sources of employment or economic development.

In order to make charcoal in Camajuani you need to live in Luis Arcos Bergnes or Taguayabón.

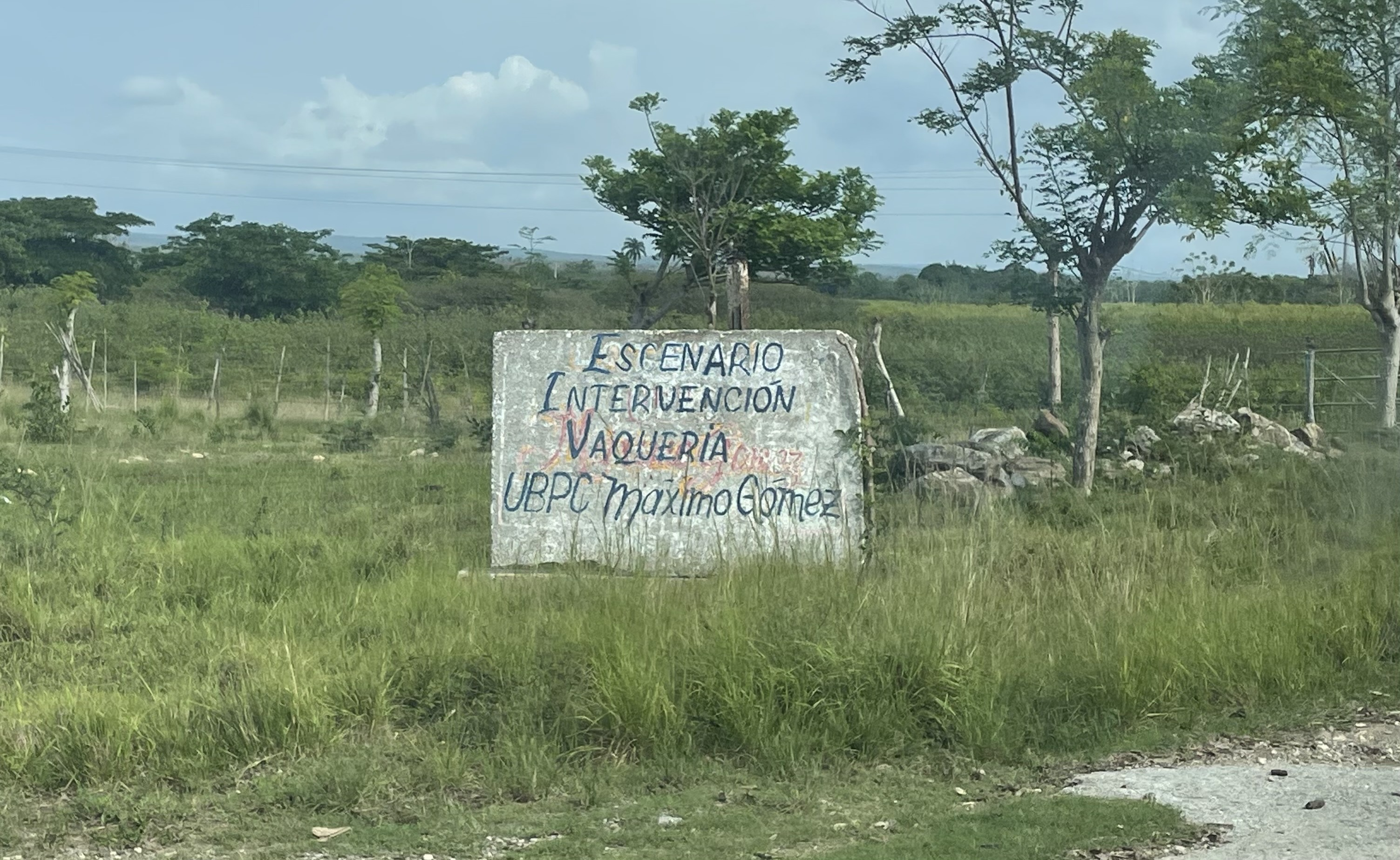
UBPC Máximo Gomez, south of Carmita

UBPC and CCS in the ward include:

- UBPC Máximo Gómez Báez (La Luz)
- UBPC Máximo Gómez (South of the village of Luis Arcos Bergnes)
- CCS Antonio Maceo (La Luz)
- CCS Salomé Hernandez (Fusté)

== Government ==
Constituency Delegate (Delegado Circunscripción) in the ward of Luis Arcos Bergnes include: (as of April 5, 2023)

- Constituency Delegate 51, Nieves de la Caridad Hernández Caso
- Constituency Delegate 52, Dianey Carballido Claro
- Constituency Delegate 53, Norge Armas Velázquez
- Constituency Delegate 54, Tania Eustaquia Méndez Pérez
- Constituency Delegate 55, Dixan Machado Pérez

== History ==
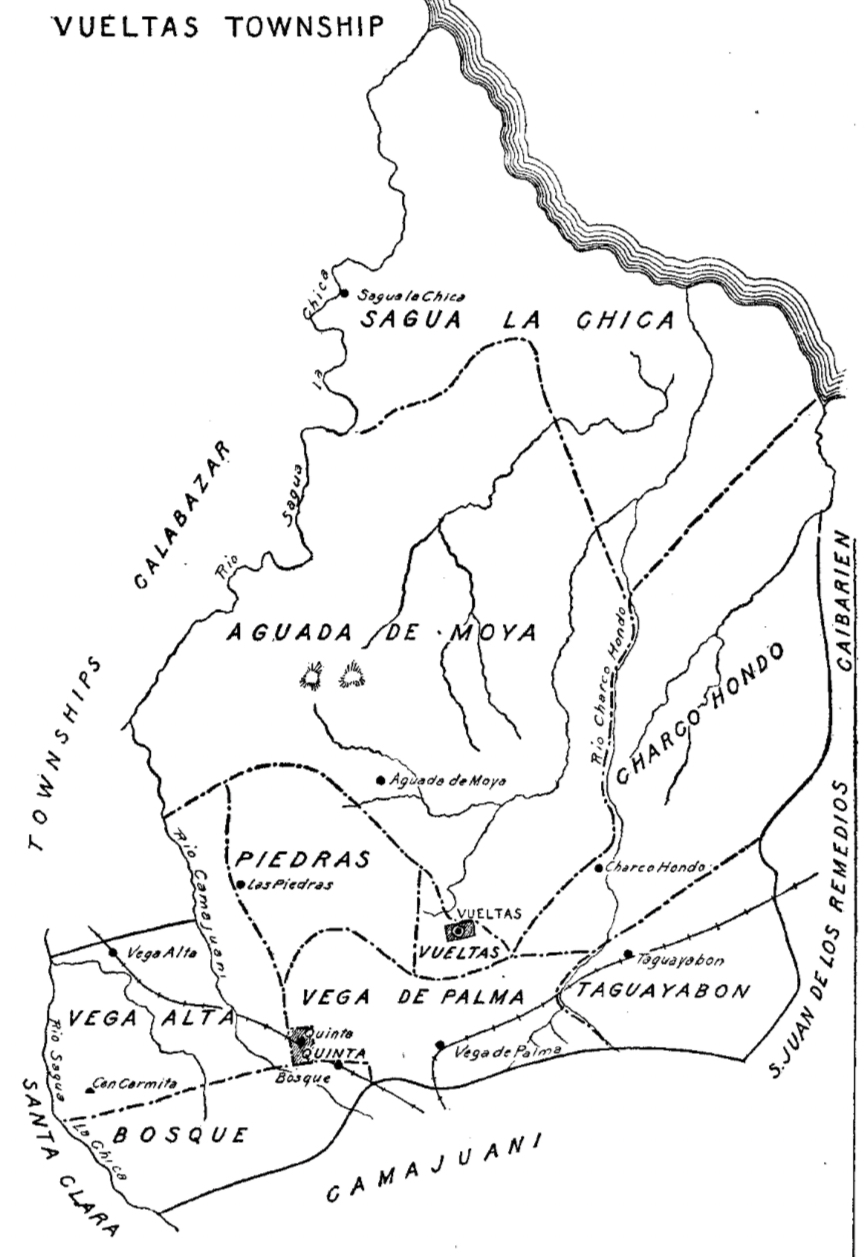
Map of Barrios of Vueltas in 1909, where you can see the Central Carmita (Carmita Sugar Mill) labeled

Carmita used to be a part of the barrio of Vega Alta, in the former municipality of Vueltas.

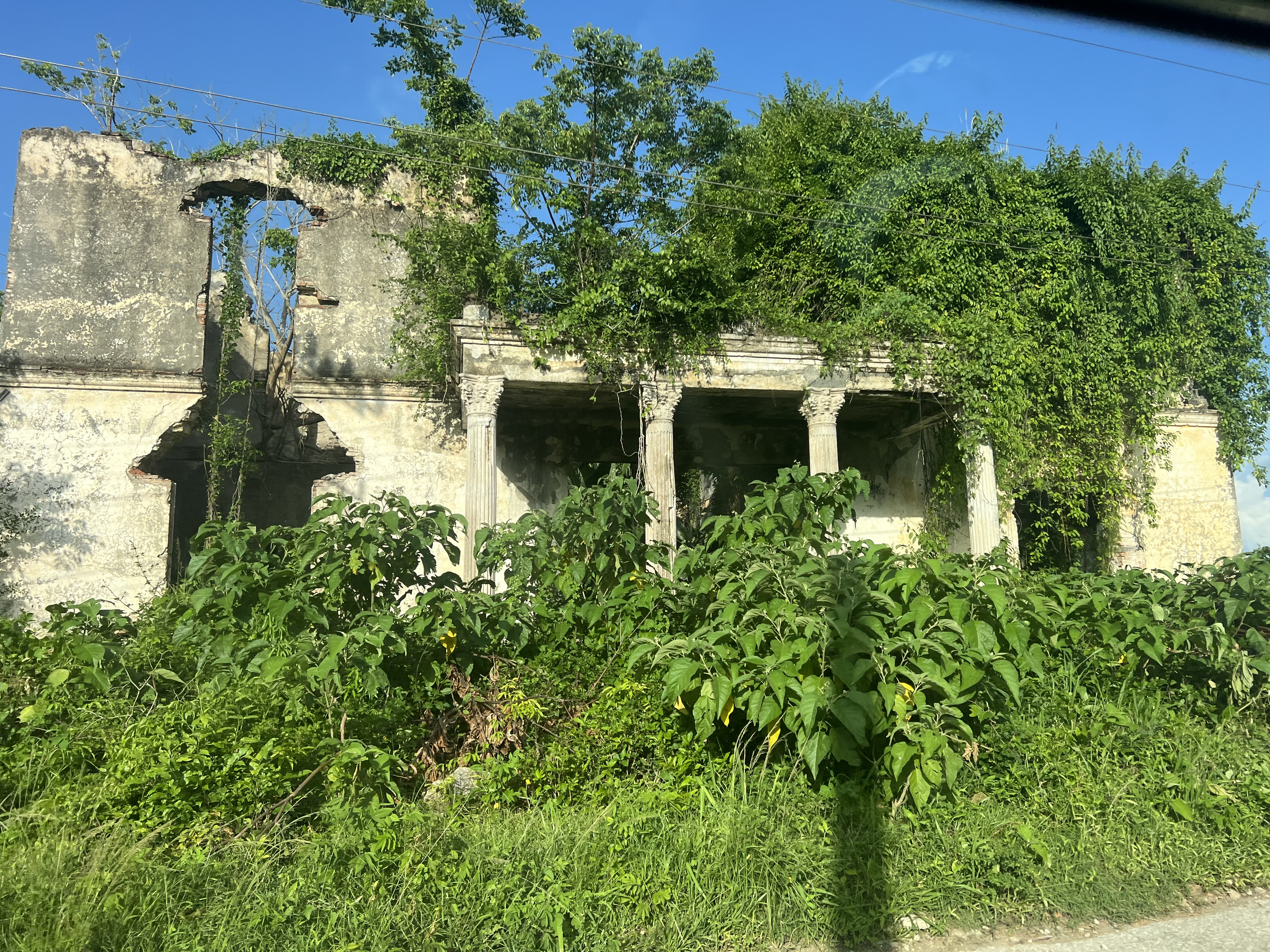
The house of Gerardo Machado

Carmita has an abandoned house on the Road to Luis Arcos Bergnes, it is said to be the house of Gerardo Machado in 1929.

== Transportation ==
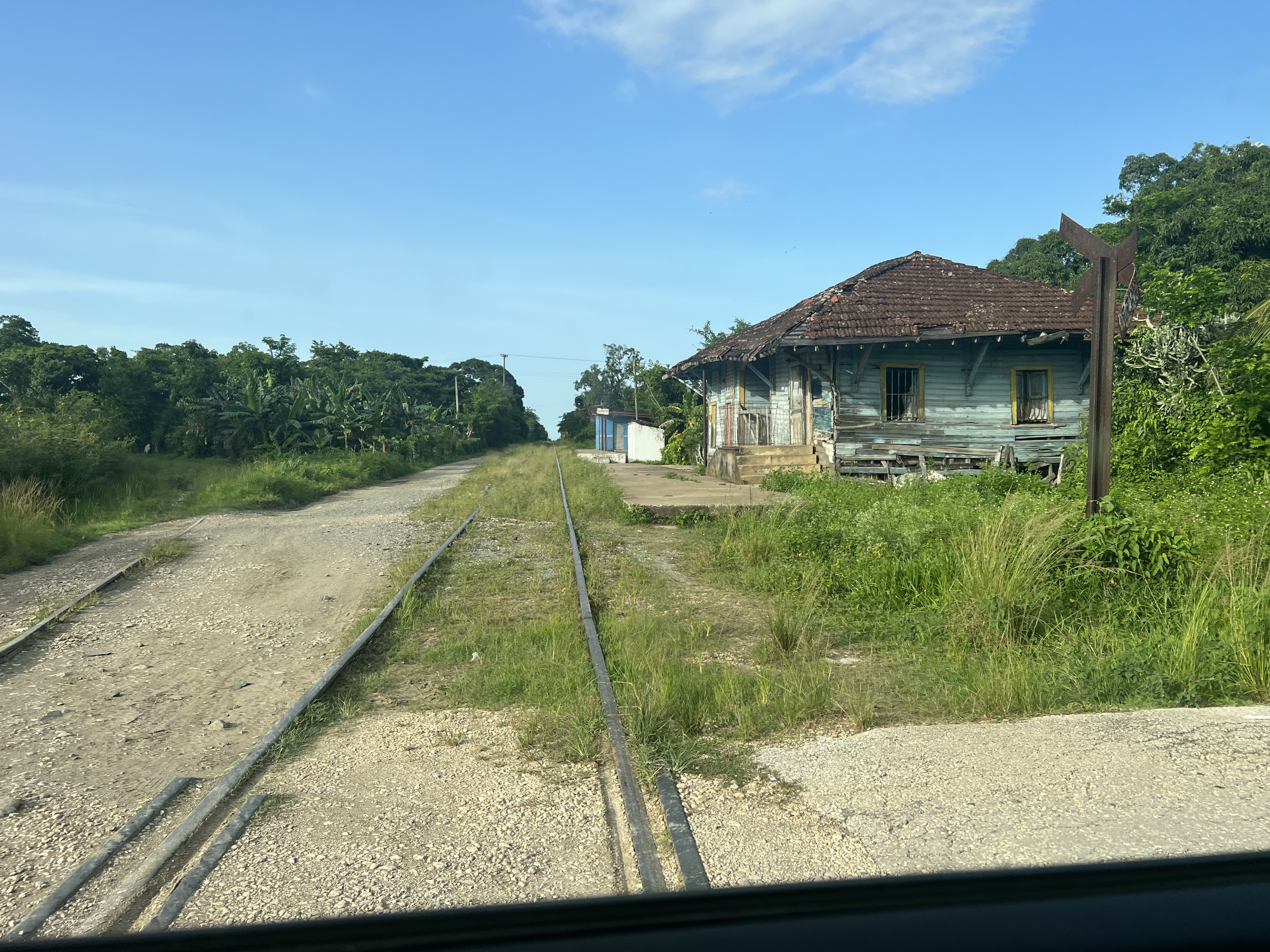
Train station of Carmita, in the south of the town

Carmita is on a rail line starting in Santa Clara, going to Crucero Margot, to Luis Arcos Bergnes, Vega Alta, Canoa, Tuinicu, Constancia, Encrucijada, Mata, El Vaquerito, Aguada la Piedra, Cifuentes, San Diego del Valle, Conyedo, and finally back to Santa Clara.

Carmita also has 2 bus routes in the town, one going from Camajuaní to Vega Alta everyday on 6:00 am and one from Camajuaní to Carmita on Tuesdays and Thursdays, 5:30 pm.

== Education ==
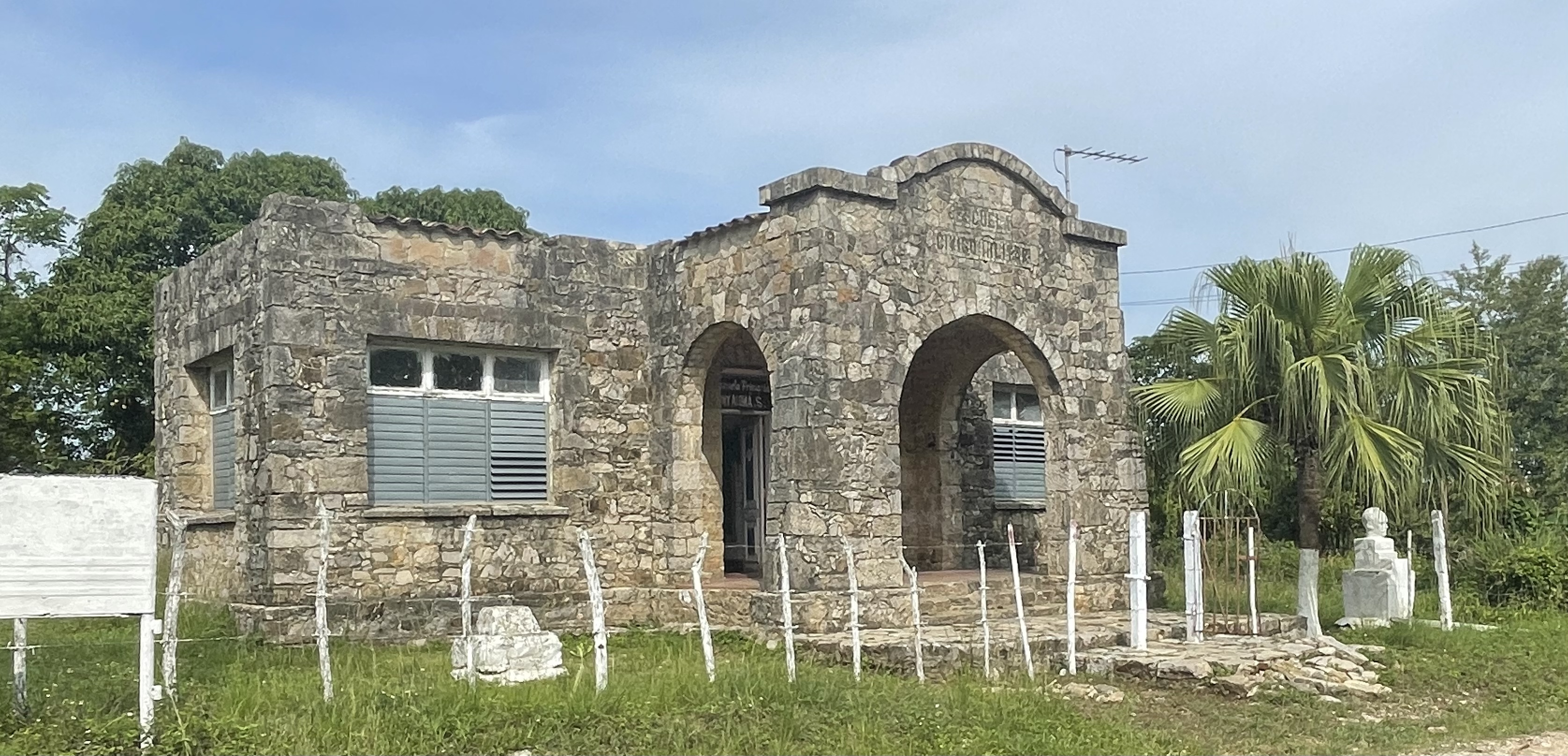
Escuela Primaria de Tony Alomá in Fusté

In the ward there are a few schools, these include:

- Luis A. Bergnes Primary
- Julio Pino Primary (Crucero Carmita)
- Delfín Sen Cedré Primary (La Luz)
- Escuela Tony Alomá (Fuste)
