= Calabazar de Sagua =

Calabazar de Sagua Calabazar
- Village
- Coat of arms

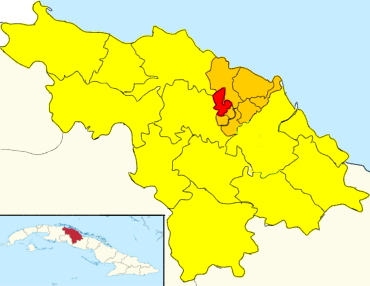
- Calabazar de Sagua (red) in Encrucijada (orange) in Villa Clara (yellow)

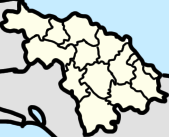
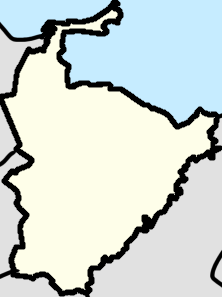
- Location of Calabazar de Sagua in Cuba Calabazar de Sagua (Villa Clara Province) Calabazar de Sagua (Encrucijada)
- Coordinates: 22°38′46.1″N 79°53′43.6″W
- Country: Cuba
- Province: Villa Clara
- Municipality: Encrucijada
- Founded: 1865

Government
  - President: Abel Bello Brito
- Elevation: 5 m (16 ft)

Population (2011)
  - Total: 7,912
- Time zone: UTC-5 (EST)
- Area code: +53-422

Calabazar de Sagua, also shortened as Calabazar, is a Cuban village and consejo popular ("people's council", i.e. hamlet) of the municipality of Encrucijada, in Villa Clara Province, Cuba. In 2011 it had a population of 7,912.

== History ==
Founded in 1865, it was part of the neighboring municipality of Sagua la Grande until the 1977 administrative reform.

== Geography ==
Located on a rural plain in the middle of its province, Calabazar lies between Encrucijada (4.5 km southeast), El Purio (4 km northeast) and Mata (4.5&km southwest). It is 17 km from Cifuentes, 30 to Vueltas, 32 to Santa Clara, 37 to Sagua la Grande, 40 to Camajuaní, 50 to Remedios and 58 to Placetas and Caibarién. In the center of the town there is the Parque Marti (Park Marti), it includes a statue of José Martí and a quote by him.

== Transport ==
The village is crossed in the middle by the "Circuito Norte" (CN) state highway, the 2nd longest one in the island. It counts a train station, Calabazar-Mata, located in the nearby village of Mata, on the Camajuaní-Encrucijada-Cifuentes (to Sagua) branch line.

On Mondays, Wednesdays, and Fridays at 5:00am buses go to Santa Clara. From Sunday to Friday at 6:30pm and 8:15pm they also go to Santa Clara.

== Education ==
Schools in Calabazar include:

- José Martí Primary School
- Antonio Maceo Primary School
- Neptalí Martínez CM
- José Manuel Fuertes Jiménez Special School
- Antonio Guiteras CEA

== Notable people ==
- Onelio Jorge Cardoso (1914–1986), writer
- Ana María Mari Machado (born 1963) politician and judge

== See also ==
- Parrandas
- Municipalities of Cuba
- List of cities in Cuba
