= Encrucijada =

- Municipality
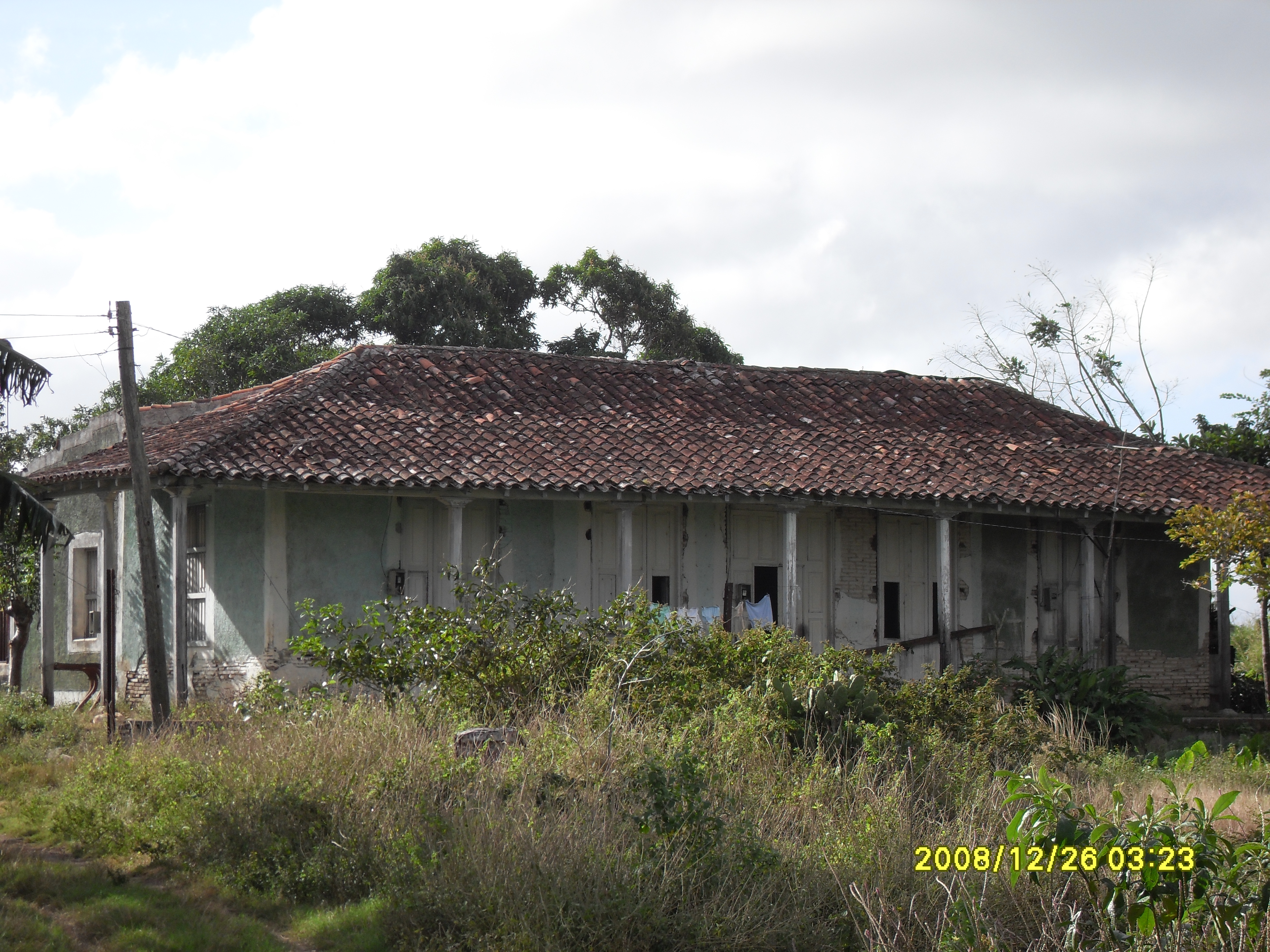
- House of Marta Abreu

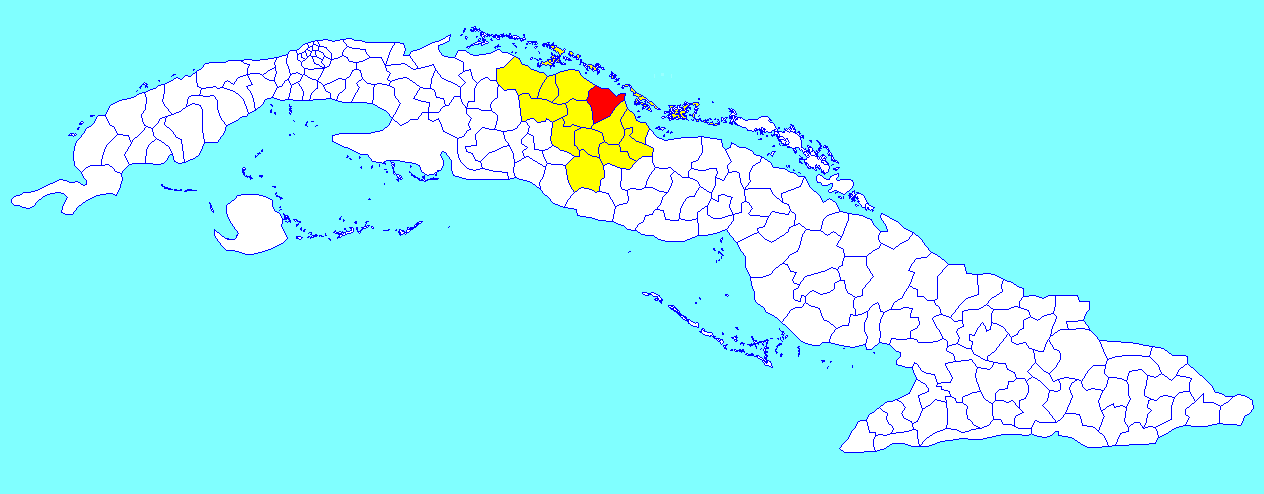
- Encrucijada municipality (red) within Villa Clara Province (yellow) and Cuba
- Coordinates: 22°37′1″N 79°51′58″W
- Country: Cuba
- Province: Villa Clara
- Founded: 1850
- Established: 1910 (Municipality)

Area
  - Total: 345 km^{2} (133 sq mi)
- Elevation: 55 m (180 ft)

Population (2022)
  - Total: 31,500
  - Density: 91.3/km^{2} (236/sq mi)
- Time zone: UTC-5 (EST)
- Area code: +53-422
- Website: https://www.somosencrucijada.gob.cu/

Encrucijada (Spanish pronunciation: [eŋkɾusiˈxaða]) is a municipality and town in the Villa Clara Province of Cuba. It was founded in 1850 and established as a municipality in 1910.

== History ==
The municipality was divided into the barrios of Centro, Paso Real, El Santo and Vega Redonda. After the 1977 administrative reform, Calabazar de Sagua, part of Sagua la Grande, became part of it.

== Geography ==
The municipality borders with Sagua la Grande, Cifuentes, Santa Clara and Camajuaní.

The Municipality has the Consejos populares (wards) of:

- Encrucijada Norte (North Encrucijada in English)
- Encrucijada Sur (South Encrucijada in English)
- Abel Santamaría
- Dos Hermanas
- La Sierra
- Calabazar de Sagua
- El Purio
- El Santo
- Emilio Córdova

== Transportation ==
Encrucijada is on a rail line starting in Santa Clara, going to Crucero Margot, to Luis Arcos Bergnes, Vega Alta, Canoa, Tuinicu, Constancia, Encrucijada, Mata, El Vaquerito, Aguada la Piedra, Cifuentes, San Diego del Valle, Conyedo, and finally back to Santa Clara.

The municipality has 3 state highways, being the Carretera de Malezas (4–311), linking the municipality to the provincial capital, Santa Clara, Highway 4–273, from Calabazar de Sagua to the municipality of Cifuentes, and the Circuito Norte (4–I–3) from Calabazar–Encrucijada–La Sierra and the municipalities of Sagua La Grande and Camajuaní.

== Demographics ==
In 2004, the municipality of Encrucijada had a population of 33,641. With a total area of 345 km^{2} (133 sq mi), it has a population density of 97.5/km^{2} (253/sq mi). The population number had dropped to 31,500 in 2022.

== Notable people ==
- Onelio Jorge Cardoso (1914–1986), writer, born in Calabazar
- Jesús Menéndez Larrondo (1911–1948), trade unionist and politician
- Abel Santamaría Cuadrado (1927–1953), revolutionary, born in Constancia
- Haydée Santamaría Cuadrado (1922–1980), revolutionary, born in Constancia

== See also ==
- Municipalities of Cuba
- List of cities in Cuba
