= Santa Clara–Caibarién Road =

Road in Cuba

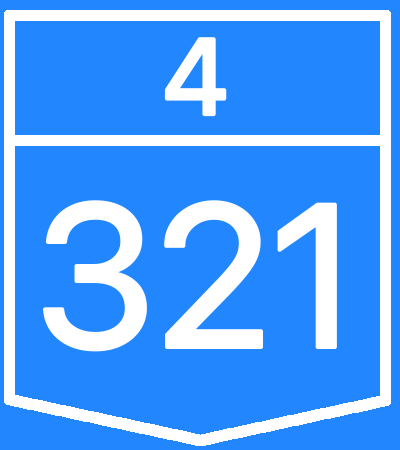
Carretera Santa Clara–Caibarién
- Santa Clara–Caibarién Road
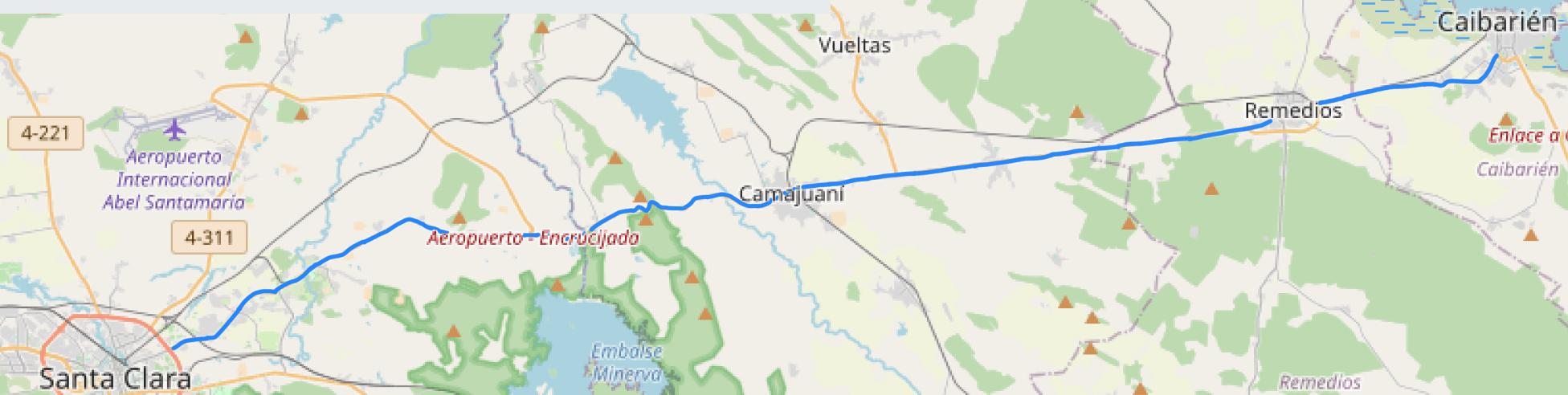
- The Road seen in blue on OpenStreetMap

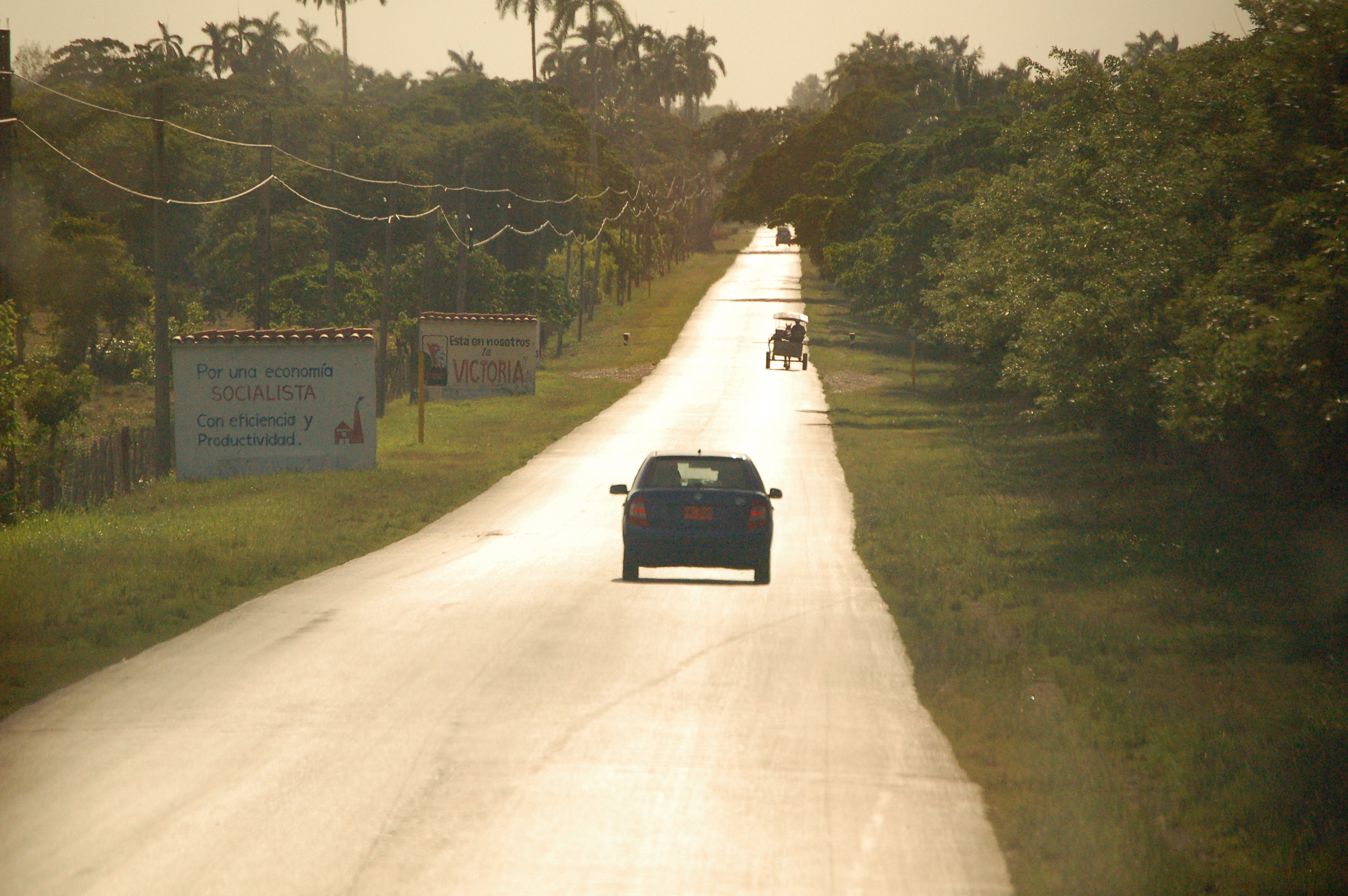
- Road in Remedios

Route information
- Length: 52.33 km (32.52 mi)

Major junctions
- West end: Circunvalación de Santa Clara in Santa Clara
- Road to Santa Clara Airport near Crucero Carmita; 4–I–3 in Entronque de Vueltas
- East end: 4–I–3 in Caibarién

Location
- Country: Cuba
- Provinces: Villa Clara
- Municipalities: Santa Clara, Camajuaní, Remedios, Caibarién

Highway system
- Roads in Cuba

The Santa Clara–Caibarién Road (4–321), also known as the Road of Camajuaní, is a Cuban state highway connecting the cities of Santa Clara to Caibarién. It starts at a roundabout with the Avenida Liberacion and the Santa Clara Beltway in Santa Clara, to continue east through the settlements of Minagric, Los Moros, La Granjita, El Gigante, the University of Las Villas, Camilo Cienfuegos, Los Güiros, Los Paragüitas, El Amparo, El Berro, Crucero Carmita, Blanquizal, Tarafa, Monte de la Coja, Camajuaní, El Níspero, Entronque de Vueltas, Muelas Quietas, Taguayabón, Aguanó, El Chalet, Remedios, Marcelo Salado, and finally reaches Caibarién.

== History ==
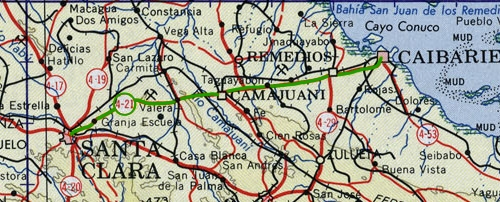
4–21 highlighted in green from a map from 1961

In the 1960s, the roadway was known as the 4–21.

In June 2024, in Crucero Carmita on the 4–321, a tourist Transgaviota bus, coming from Cayo Santa María to the Abel Santamaría Airport, and a privately owned car crashed into each other, with 26 injuries and 1 death, with it being suggested the car went into the left lane, which is common in the region.

Also in June 2024, residents living nearby the road, in the Santa Clara-Camajuani area, protests and blocked the road due to lack of drinking water in the region for 50 days. Residents have been seen getting buckets of water going along the road in order to have drinking water. Sources say over 3,500 people living in neighborhoods around the road have been affected in an over 68 day period.

== Route ==
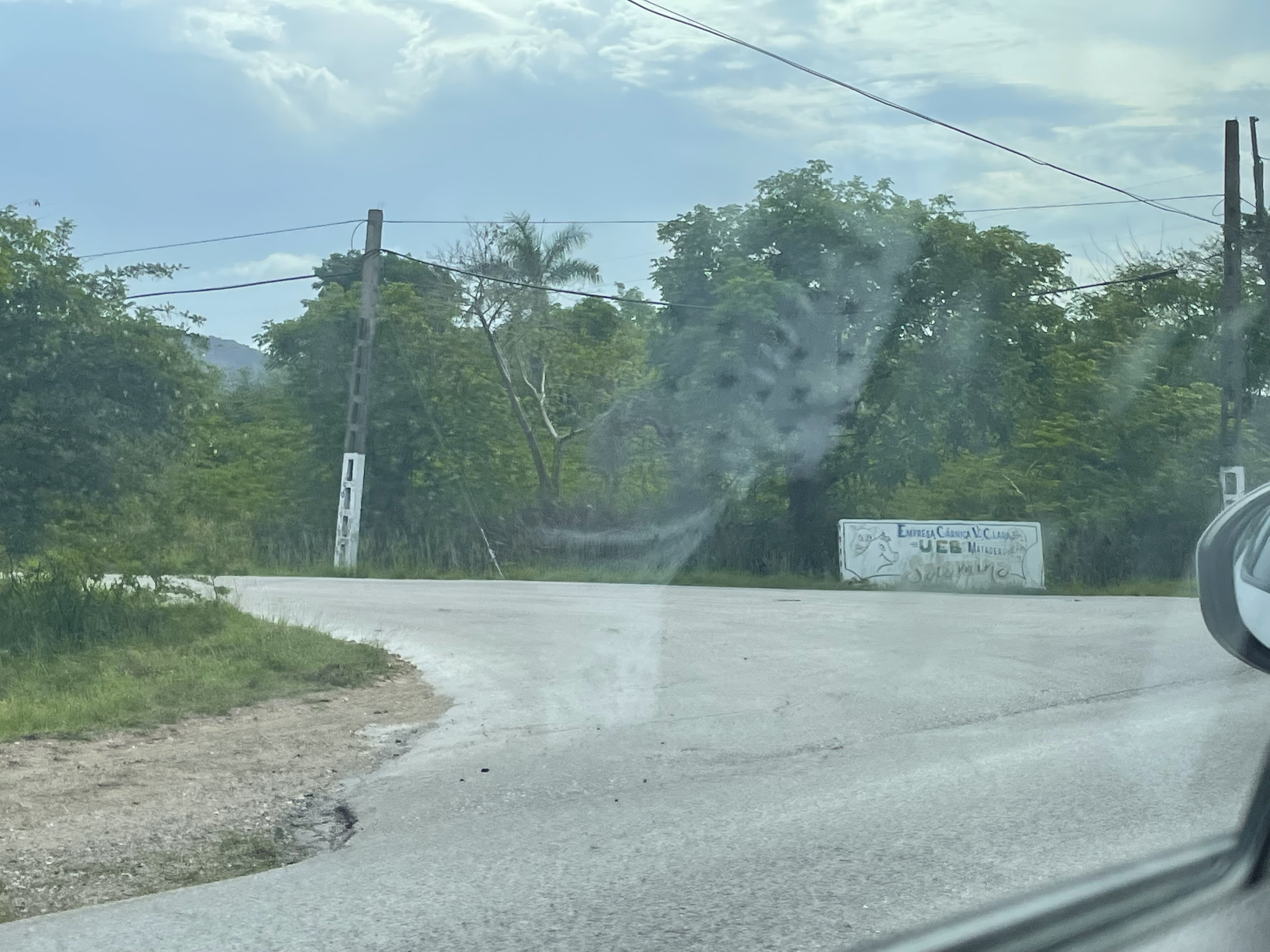
Junction to the Salaminas Matadero Alamo

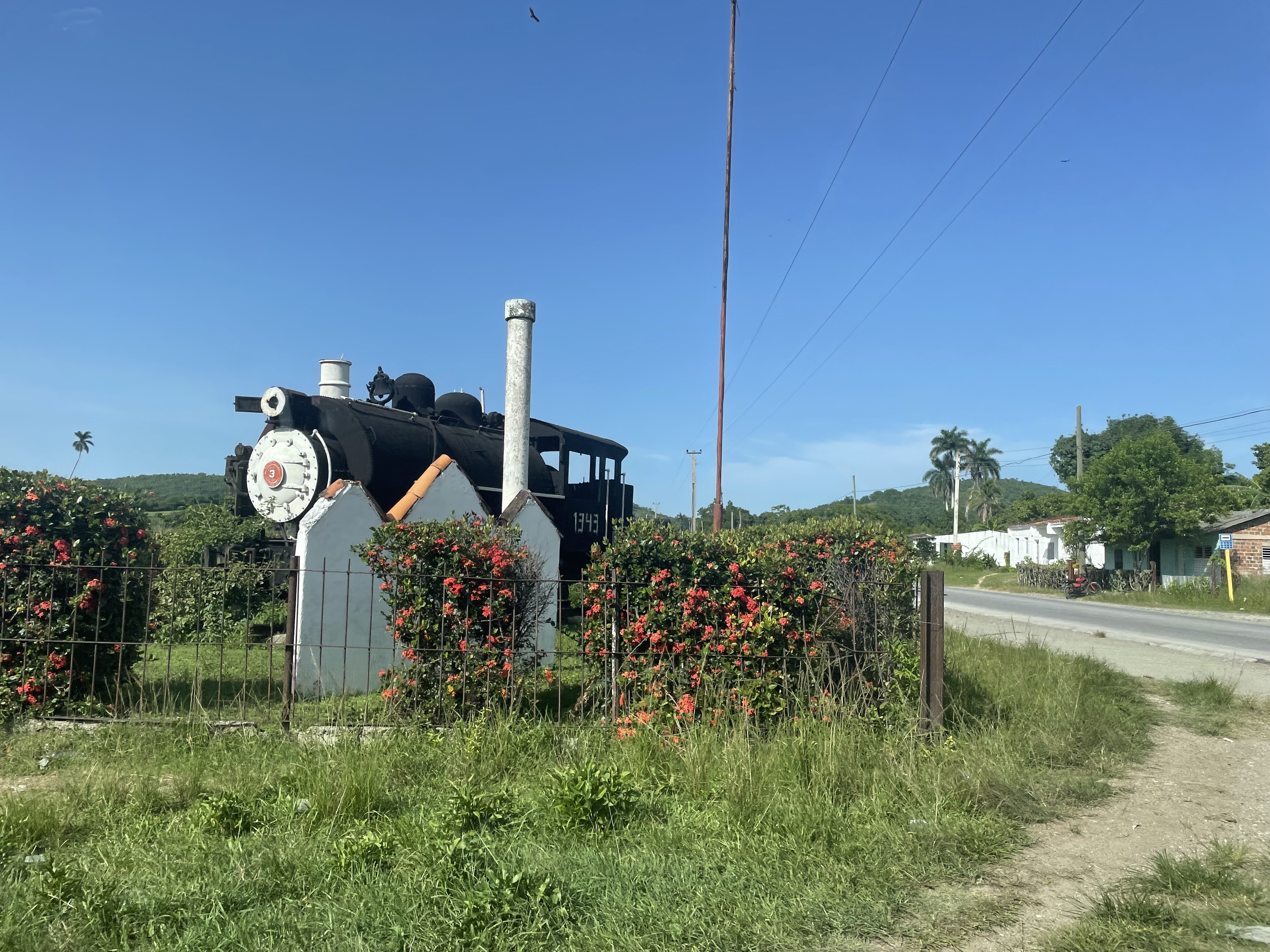
Train #1343 in Crucero Carmita, on the junction with the Road to Luis Arcos Bergnes

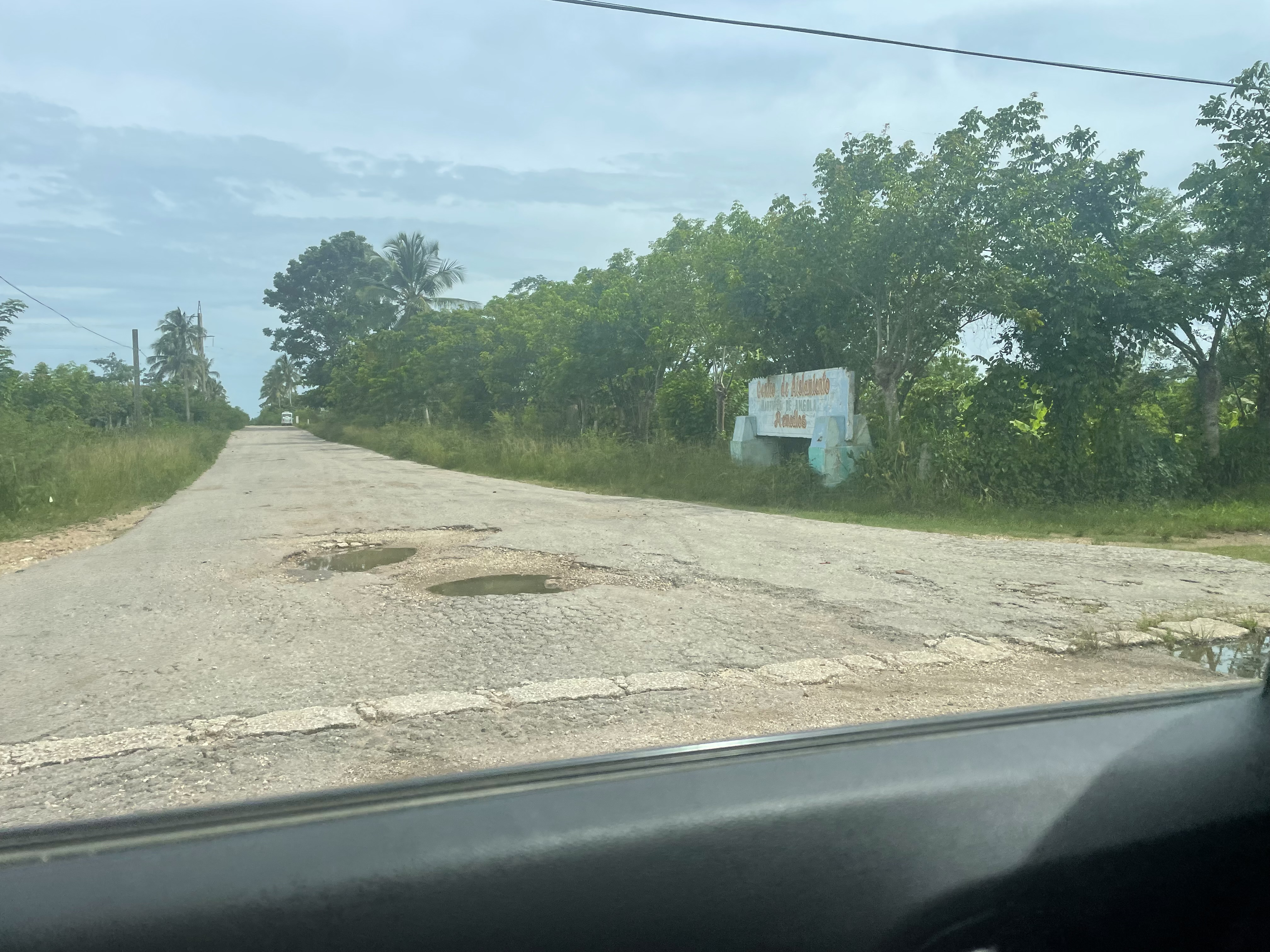
Junction heading to the Mártires de Angola school

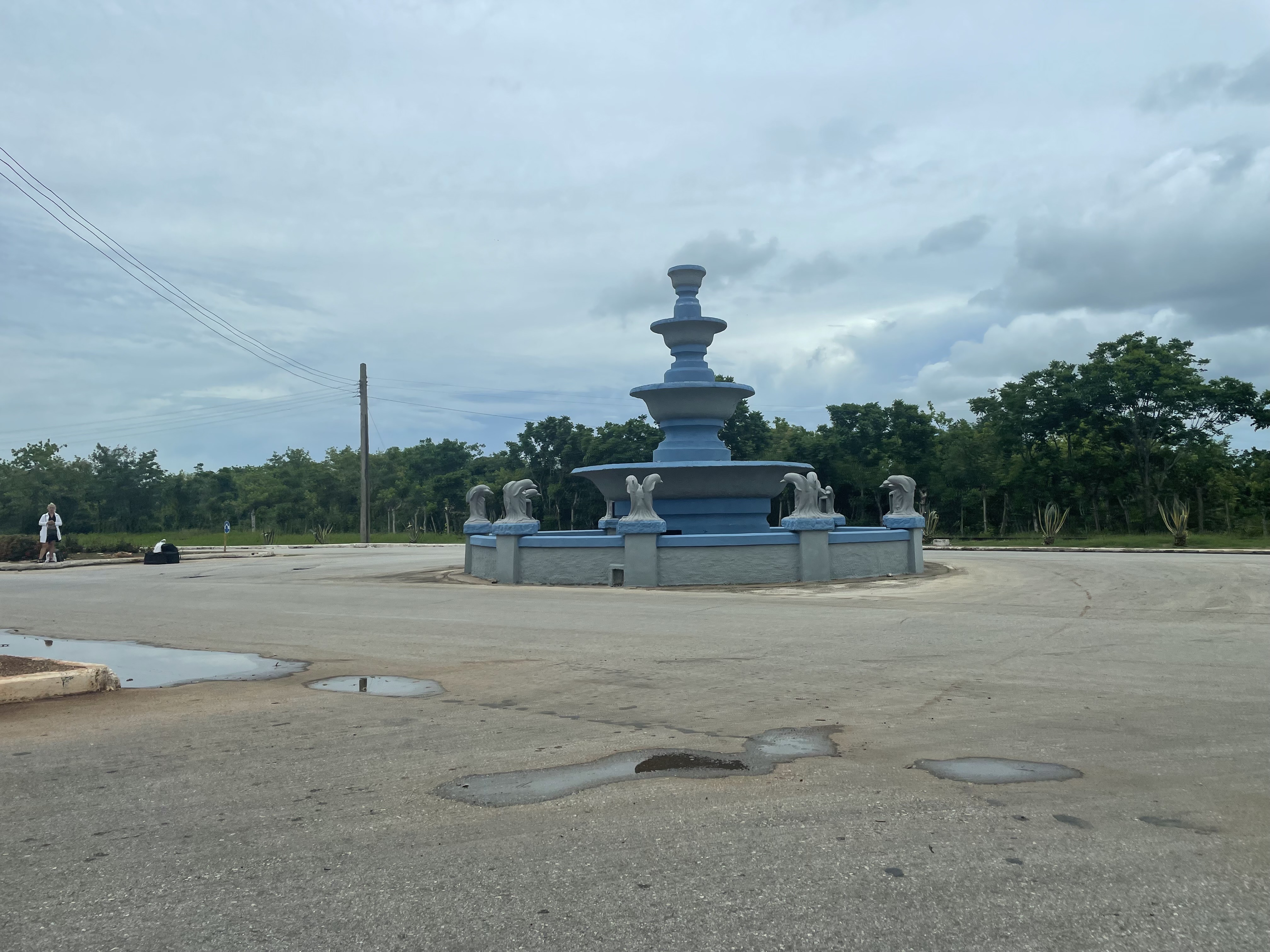
Fountain of Dolphins seen on the Remedios Beltway roundabout

Municipality	Location	km	mi	Destination	Notes
Santa Clara	Santa Clara	0	0	Santa Clara Beltway / To 4–N–1 (Carretera Central) / To 4–311 (Carretera de Maleza)	Continues onto Avenida Liberacion
Santa Clara	Santa Clara	2.28		Textilera Texvi	
Santa Clara	Santa Clara	2.99		Ciudad Escolar Che Guevara	
Santa Clara	Santa Clara	4.32		Calle Lazaro Cardenas – Lazaro Cardenas School	
Santa Clara	Santa Clara	4.83		4–431 (Calle 5ta)	
Santa Clara	Santa Clara	5.35		University of Las Villas entrance	
Santa Clara	Santa Clara	6.22		University of Las Villas sports section	
Santa Clara	Santa Clara	6.29		University of Las Villas agriculture facilities	
Santa Clara	Santa Clara	6.52		Alley of Los Patos – Callejon de los Patos, Camilo Cienfuegos	
Santa Clara	Los Guiros	9.11		Calle 1ra – Crucero Margot	
Santa Clara	El Amparo	12.86		PLOMAC	
Santa Clara		14.96		Road to Cayo Santa María – Abel Santamaría Airport, Encrucijada	
Santa Clara		15.96		Salaminas Matadero Alamo	
Santa Clara	El Berro	16.28		Campismo Minerva, Embalse Minerva	
Santa Clara-Camajuaní border		17.04		Sagua la Chica River Bridge	
Camajuaní	Crucero Carmita	17.65		Road to Luis Arcos Bergnes – Luis Arcos Bergnes, Vega Alta	#1343 train tourist attraction located at junction
Camajuaní	Santa Fe	19.88		Santa Fe Curve	
Camajuaní		20.49		Road of Corona – Corona	
Camajuaní		22.85		Camajuaní River Bridge	
Camajuaní	Camajuaní	24.58		La Quinta Road – El Bosque, La Quinta	
Camajuaní	Camajuaní	25.42		4–401 (Calle General Naya / Carretera al Fe) – Arroyo Frio, José María Pérez, Sabana, Placetas	
Camajuaní	Camajuaní	26.13		Calle Leoncio Vidal	
Camajuaní	Entronque de Vueltas	29.32		4–I–3 (Circuito Norte) – Vega de Palma, Vueltas, Aguada de Moya	Western terminus of concurrency with the 4–I–3
Camajuaní	Taguayabón	33.12		Calle José Rivadeneira Blanco	
Camajuaní		36.20		Palenque Heights	
Camajuaní		36.72		Palenque	
Remedios		39.08		Martires de Angola School	
Remedios	Remedios	42.37		Circunvalación de Remedios	
Remedios	Remedios	43.53		4–461 (Carretera a Zulueta) – Zulueta, Placetas	
Remedios	Remedios	44.22		Calle Enrique Malaret – Jinaguayabo, Playa Jinaguayabo	
Remedios	Remedios	44.22		4–511 (Calle Camilo Cienfuegos / Carretera a Rojas) – Rojas, Guajabana	
Remedios	Remedios	44.62		Avenida Marcelo Salado	
Remedios	Remedios	45.18		Circunvalación de Remedios	Dolphin fountain tourist attraction
Remedios		46.20		Remedios 110kv, Batería Grupo Electrógeno Remedios	
Caibarién		47.85			
Caibarién		47.89		Curva de Waterloo	
Caibarién	Caibarién	49.43		Calle F	
Caibarién	Caibarién	49.65		Calle 9 / Calle A / Calle 8	
Caibarién	Caibarién	49.90		Calle 4	
Caibarién	Caibarién	50.18		Calle 1	
Caibarién	Caibarién	50.50		Caibarien Remedios Road	
Caibarién	Caibarién	51.82		Calle 42	
Caibarién	Caibarién	51.94		Calle 5ta / Calle 40	
Caibarién	Caibarién	52.33	32.52	4–I–3 (Circuito Norte / Calle 34) / Avenida 9	Eastern terminus of concurrency with the 4–I–3; Continues as Avenida 11
