= Road to Cayo Santa María =

Carretera a Cayo Santa María
- Road to Cayo Santa Maria
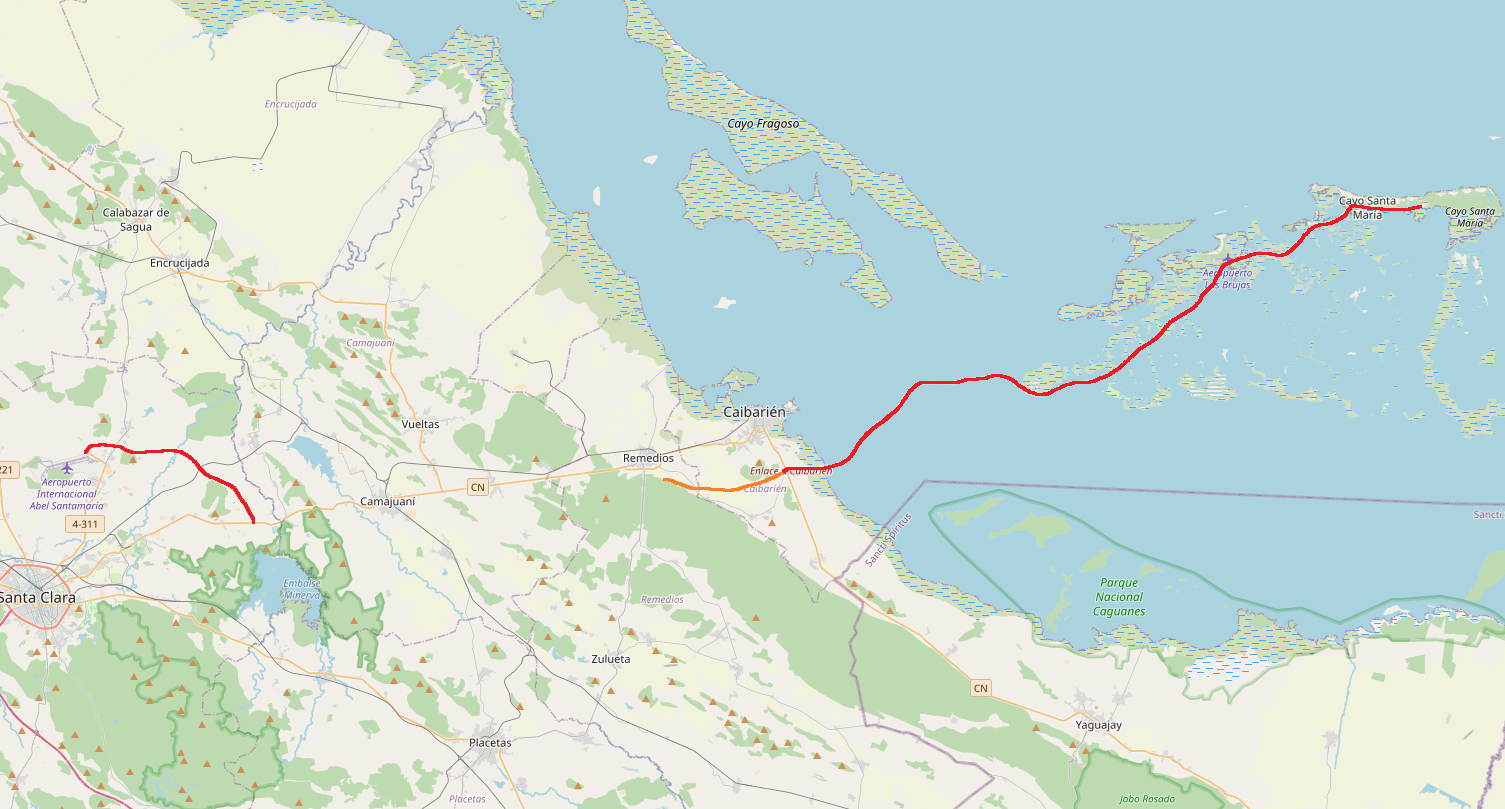
- Finished road (red), under construction (orange)

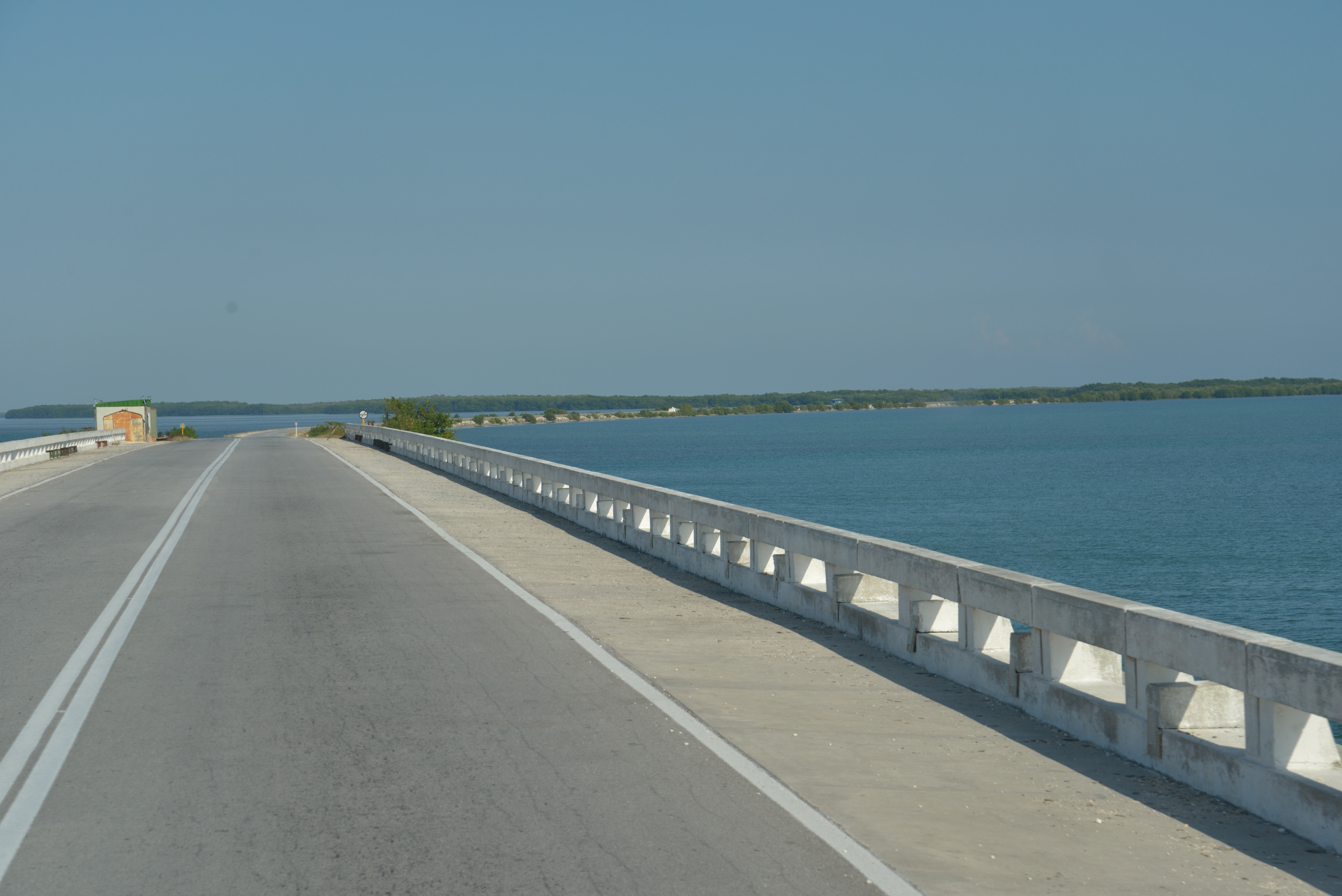
- The Causeway of Cayo Santa María

Route information
- Existed: 2000–present

Road to Santa Clara Airport
- Length: 15 km (9.3 mi)
- West end: Abel Santamaría Airport
- Major intersections: 4–311 near Frank Pais
- East end: 4–321 near Crucero Carmita

Planned section
- Length: 38 km (24 mi)
- West end: 4–321 near Crucero Carmita
- Major intersections: 4–461 near Remedios
- East end: 4–I–23

Cayo Santa María Causeway
- Length: 53 km (33 mi)
- West end: 4–I–23
- Major intersections: Las Brujas Airport; Cayo Santa María International Clinic
- East end: Cayo Santa María

Location
- Country: Cuba
- Provinces: Villa Clara
- Municipalities: Santa Clara, Camajuaní, Remedios, Caibarién
- Towns: Cayo Santa María
- Villages: Bartolomé (planned), José María Pérez (planned)

Highway system
- Roads in Cuba

The Road to Cayo Santa María is a road that was planned to connect the Abel Santamaría Airport and Cayo Santa María in order to get tourists from the airport to the hotels faster and safer. The road currently has two parts and is under construction. The first section is commonly known as the Road to the Santa Clara Airport, which goes from the airport to the Road of Camajuaní. The second section starts from the Circuito Norte, and goes east on the part known as the Cayo Santa María Causeway and continues until the Cayo Santa María.

== History ==
In 1989, Fidel Castro states plans on making roads to connect to the provinces keys and make it a tourist area, with construction of the Causeway starting later that year. The Causeway finished paving all 48 km in 2000, becoming the longest Courseway in the world and has been awarded the Puente de Alcántara prize for the "Best Ibero-American Civil Works", for its size, structure, and engineering in an area of great economic potential and its integration into the natural landscape. In 2020, Mintur, made an observation on the causeway, with it needing the readjustment of the metal road protection curbs, along more than 40km, and the repair of several connecting bridges of the viaduct. The biggest hit on the road was Hurricane Irma in 2017, causing increasing displacement of the internal components of the structure.

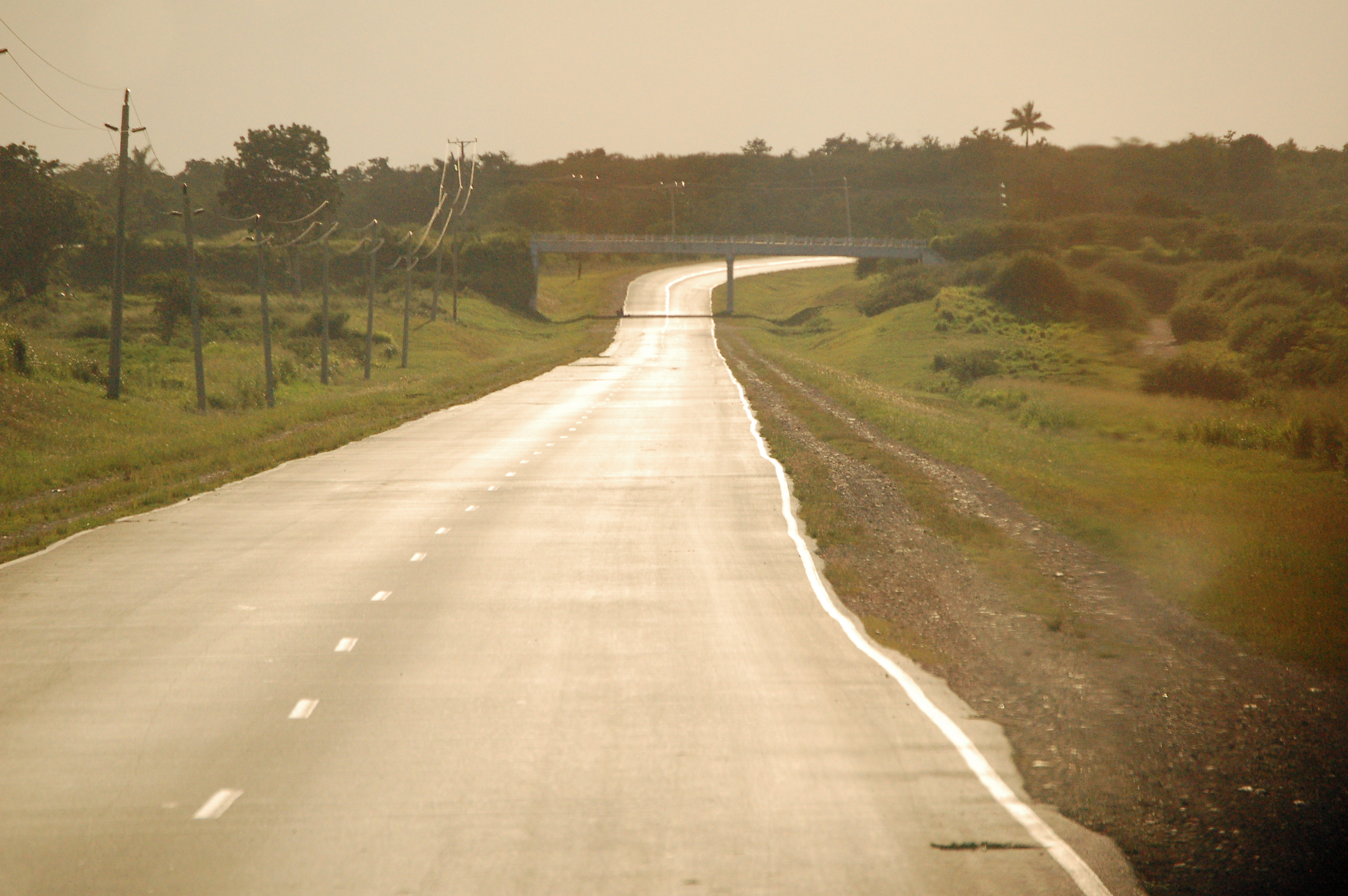
Santa Clara Airport section of the road

The road from the airport was first planned to be 53 km and go directly from the airport to the Causeway, with it going south of the Road to Camajuaní and the Circuito Norte, near the towns of Bartolomé and Rojas, on the Remedios–Zulueta Road (4–641) and Carretera a Rojas. The plan was supposed to be revived in 2011, with 15 km already built beforehand, they just needed the final touches for it to get approved for the economy of next year, although the road is currently only under construction in the eastern intersection with the Circuito Norte, and nothing appears to be done in the west. Once finished, the whole road going from the airport to Santa María would be about 106 km.

The Santa Clara Airport section of the road was formerly part of the municipalities of Cifuentes and Camajuaní before the municipalities changed its border to become fully a part of Santa Clara.

Currently, buses going from the Abel Santamaría Airport go through the 4–321 after the Airport section of the road ends, then continues straight onto the Circuito Norte to finally get onto the exit to get onto the Causeway of Cayo Santamaria, to later get into the hotels.

== Route ==
The road is currently divided into two sections, one going from the Abel Santamaría Airport to the Road of Camajuaní, and the other is the Causeway that reaches the Cayo Santa Maria. The causeway section is 53 miles long, and takes less than an hour to drive through.

Municipality	Location	↓km↓	Destination	Notes
Santa Clara	Abel Santamaria Airport	0	Abel Santamaría Airport	Roundabout
Santa Clara	Frank País	3	4–311 (Carretera de Malezas) – Encrucijada, Santa Clara	Interchange; Unofficial entrance to Road to Santa Clara Airport Westbound; Unofficial exit from Road to Santa Clara Airport Eastbound
Santa Clara		15	4–321 (Carretera a Camajuaní) – Camajuaní, Santa Clara	
Camajuaní		?	4–401 (Carretera al Fe) – Camajuani, José María Pérez (planned)	
Remedios		?	4–461 (Carretera a Zulueta) – Remedios, Zulueta (planned)	
Remedios		47	4–511 (Carretera a Rojas) – Rojas, Remedios (under construction)	
Caibarién		53	4–I–23 (Circuito Norte)– Caibarién, Dolores	Interchange
Caibarién	Las Brujas Airport	91	Las Brujas Airport	
Caibarién	Cayo Santa María Wildlife Refuge	106	Unnamed road – Punta Amanecer	Continues as an unnamed dirt road
