= Santa Clara Beltway =

Ring road around Santa Clara, Cuba

Circunvalación de Santa Clara
- Beltway of Santa Clara
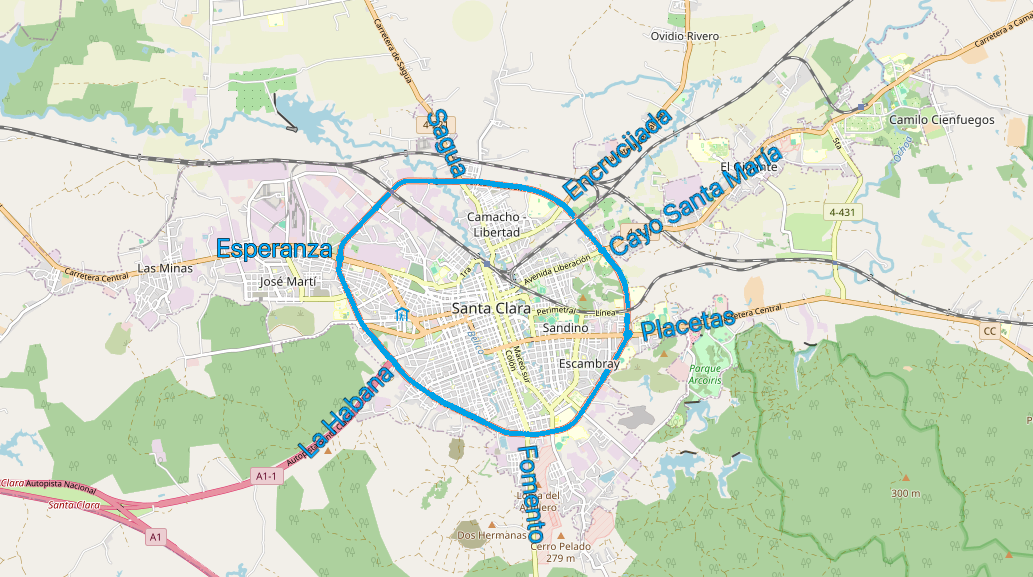
- Santa Clara Beltway seen in blue, with where each major junction leads to

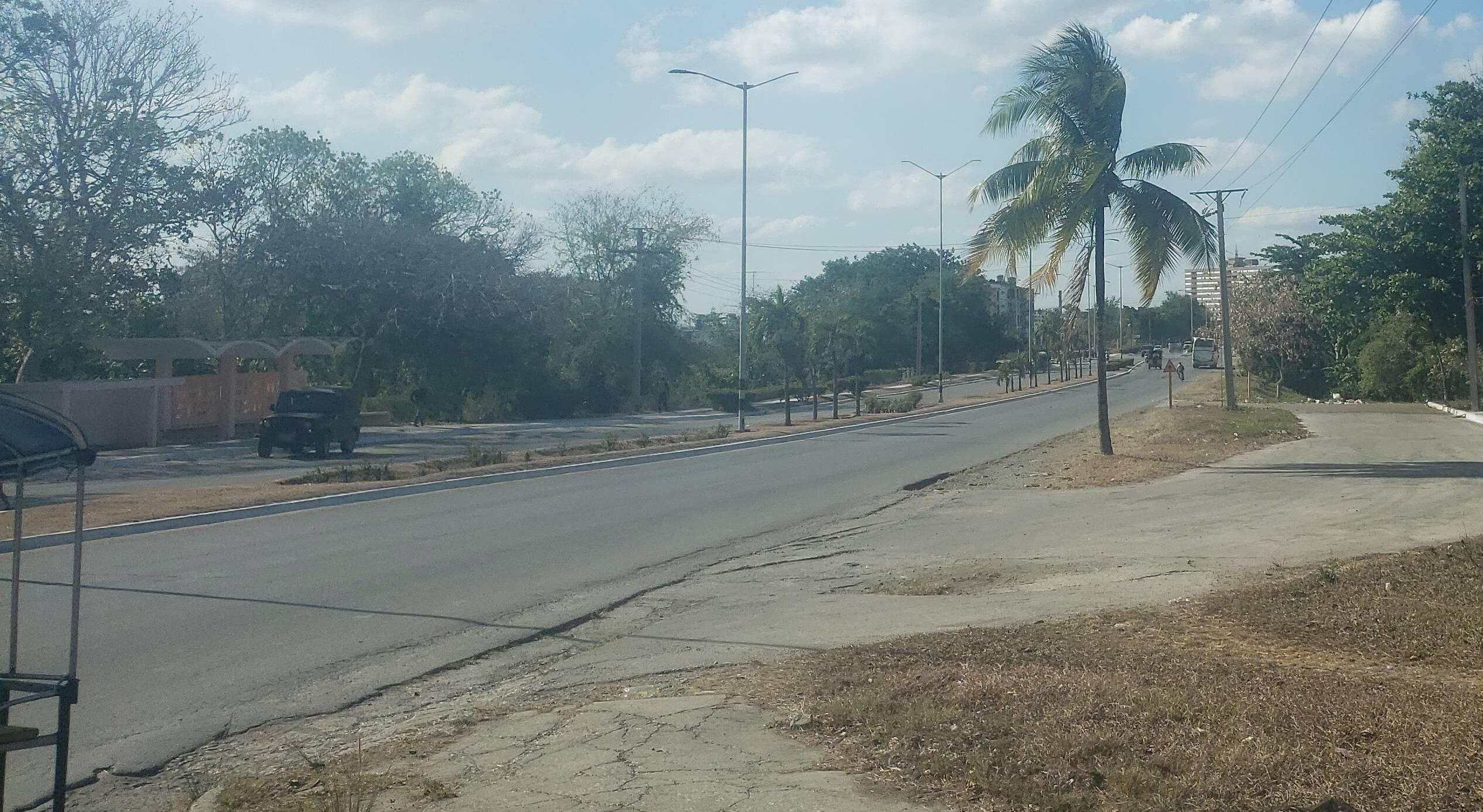
- Santa Clara Beltway seen in Virginia

Major junctions
- Beltway around Santa Clara, Cuba
- A1–1 in Condado Sur; Carret. Central in Reparto José Martí; Carret. Sagua in Camacho Libertad; Carret. Maleza in Camacho Libertas; Cayo Santamaría in Capiro–Santa Catalina; Carret. Central in Sandino; Manicaragua in Escambray

Location
- Country: Cuba
- Provinces: Villa Clara
- Municipalities: Santa Clara

Highway system
- Roads in Cuba

The Santa Clara Beltway is a ring road encircling the city of Santa Clara, Cuba. The road is 2 lanes on both sides, with a central divider in the middle. It is commonly known as simply the Circunvalación de Santa Clara (Santa Clara Beltway), although officially its split into the Circunvalación Norte and Circunvalación Sur (North Beltway and South Beltway).

== History ==
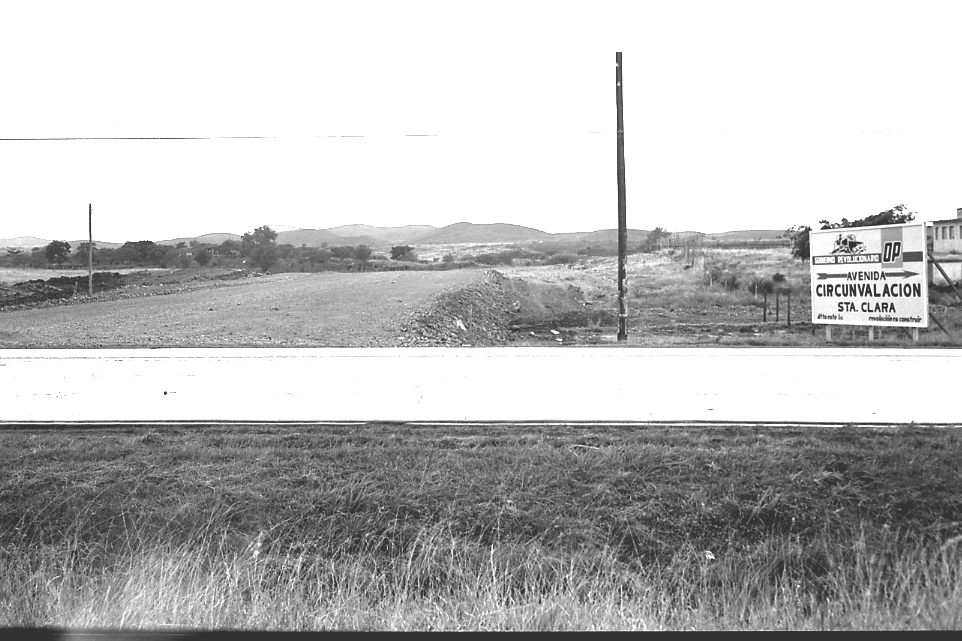
Avenida Circunvalación seen December 1959

After the Cuban Revolution, the beltway was created, along with other roads being made, including making the Avenida 26 de Julio into a 2 lane road on both sides, and later, making access to the Autopista Nacional, by the Autopista Santa Clara.

== Safety ==
In 2015, both the Circunvalación Norte and Circunvalación Sur were considered two of the 22 dangerous sections in Villa Clara Province, with the Circunvalación Norte having 14 accidents, two deaths, and 17 people injured, and the Circunvalación Sur having 9 accidents and 6 people injured.

In 2019, the section of the road coming in between the roundabouts of Santa Clara–Sagua Road and the Carretera de Maleza was inspected, and was found to be in need of minor fixes, including fissures and low severity cracks, along with not enough road signs along the section of the road.

In 2022, a cyclist died on the road due to a resident in a Peugeot speeding at an estimate 130–150 km (81–93 miles) per hour. Later the same year, a car fell roof first into the Belico River bridge due to a technical failure of the vehicle, with two people inside only one person fainted and the other seemed to be fine.

During tourist seasons, it is known for the road, and the region in general, to be more unsafe, with an accident happening in summer 2024, at the roundabout with the Carretera Central, to Esperanza, in front of the 12 plantas building in Santa Clara.

== Route ==
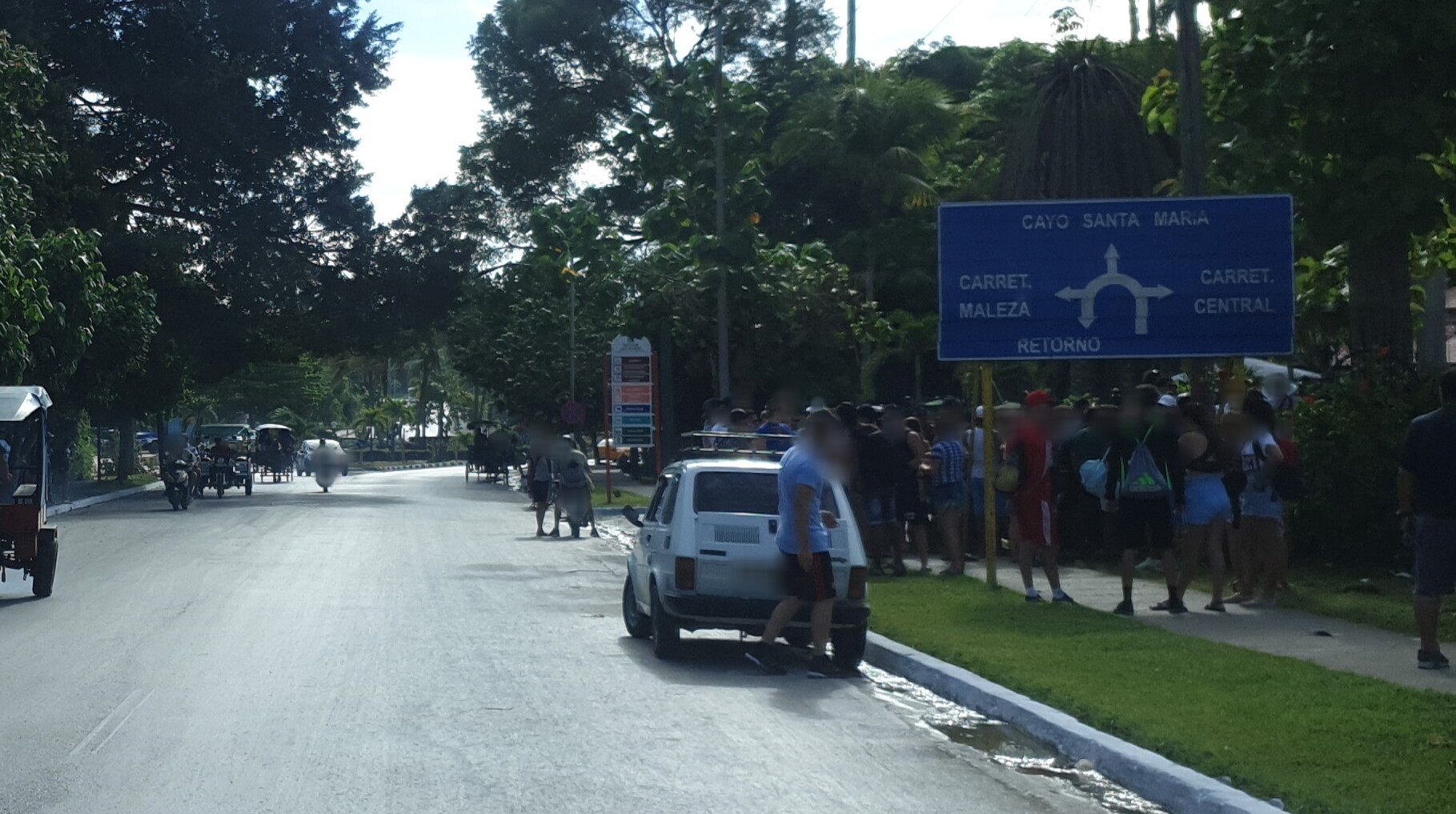
Junction of the beltway and Santa Clara–Caibarién Road sign, seen from Avenida Liberacion

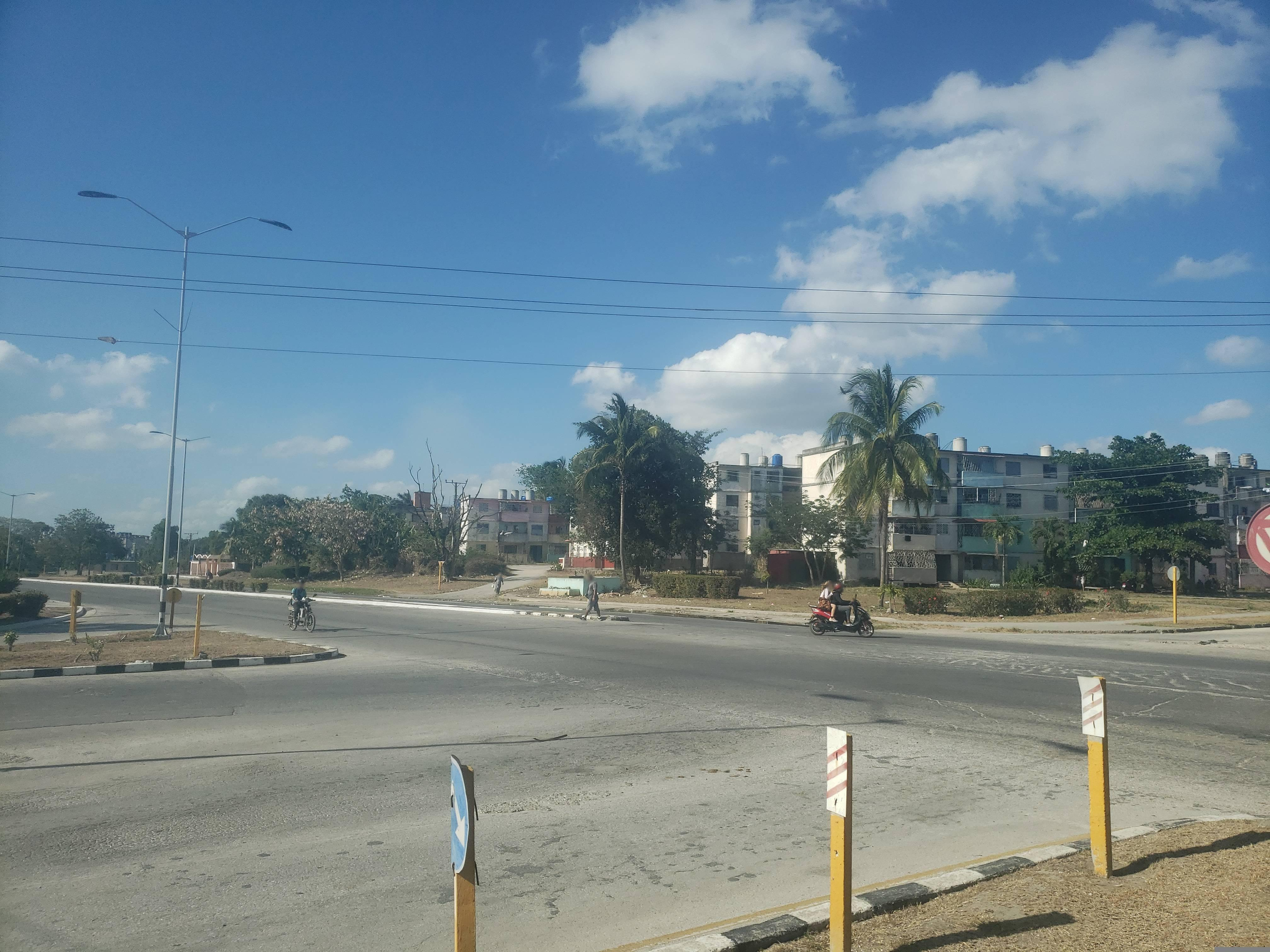
Junction of Avenida Abel Santamaria and the beltway

The whole route is located in the city and municipality of Santa Clara.

Municipality	Ward	km	mi	Destination	Notes
Santa Clara	Condado Sur			Autopista de Santa Clara (A1–1) / Avenida 9 de Abril (Calle San Miguel) / To Autopista Nacional (A1) – Havana	
Santa Clara	Virginia			Avenida de los Desfiles	
Santa Clara	Virginia			Carretera Los Caneyes / Prolongacion Marta Abreu	
Santa Clara	Virginia			Calle Oquendo	
Santa Clara	Virginia / Jose Marti			Avenida Abel Santamaria / Calle Oria	
Santa Clara	Virginia / Jose Marti			Carretera Central (4–N–1) – Esperanza	
Santa Clara	Virginia / Jose Marti			Carretera de la Planta Mecánica / Subplanta	
Santa Clara	Aeropuerto			Carretera de Sagua (4–221) / Avenida Eduardo Chibas – Cifuentes, Sagua La Grande	
Santa Clara	Aeropuerto			Calle Guamajal – Guamajal	
Santa Clara	Aeropuerto			Carretera de Malezas (4–311) – Abel Santamaría Airport, Encrucijada, Calabazar de Sagua	
Santa Clara	Capiro - Santa Catalina			Carretera a Camajuaní (4–321) / Avenida Liberacion – Cayo Santa María	
Santa Clara	Sandino			Linea	
Santa Clara	Sandino			Carretera Central (4–N–1) – Placetas	
Santa Clara	Escambray			Carretera del Guacalote	
Santa Clara	Escambray			Carretera del Acueducto / Prolongación de Colón – Boquerones, Rebacadero	
Santa Clara	Escambray			Carretera a Manicaragua (4–474) / Paseo de la Paz – Mataguá, Manicaragua, Fomento, Trinidad	
