= BWW =

BWW may refer to:

- Balan Wonderworld, a 2021 platform game developed by Arzest and published by Square Enix.
- Britt World Wide, a unit of Amway Global
- Buffalo Wild Wings, also known as BWW
- Las Brujas Airport (Cuba), IATA airport code
- Bertram Wilberforce Wooster, a character in P. G. Wodehouse's "Jeeves and Wooster" novels and short stories
