= Road of Malezas =

Road in Cuba

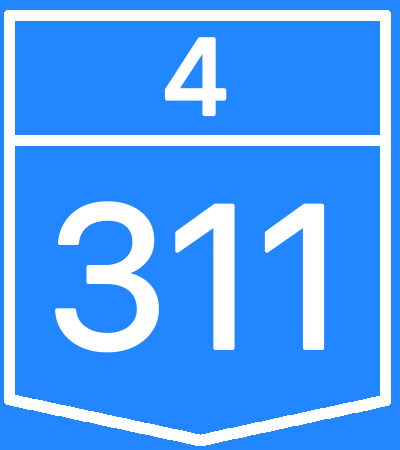
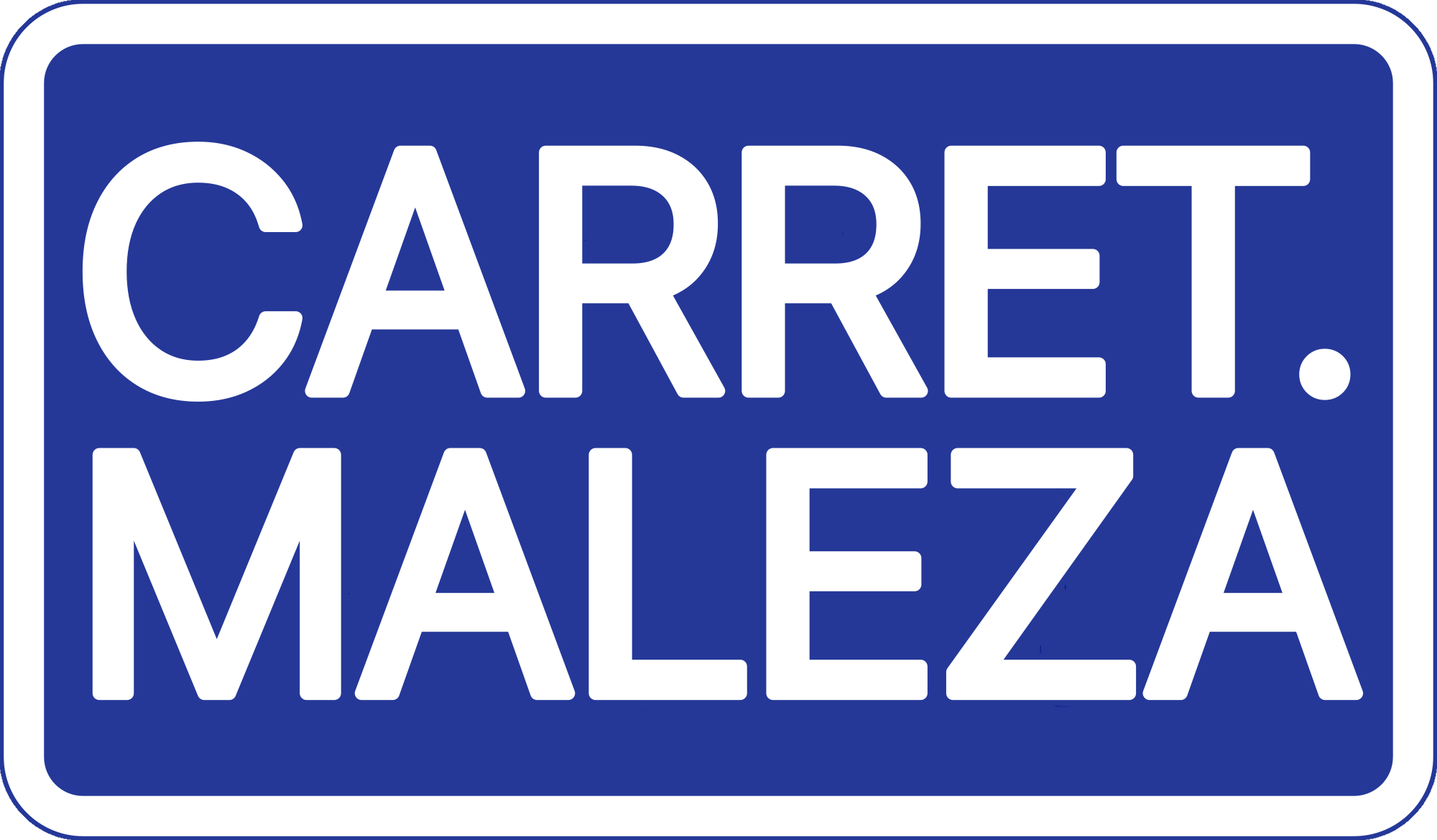
Carretera de Malezas
- Road of Malezas
- Santa Clara–Encrucijada Road; 4–311
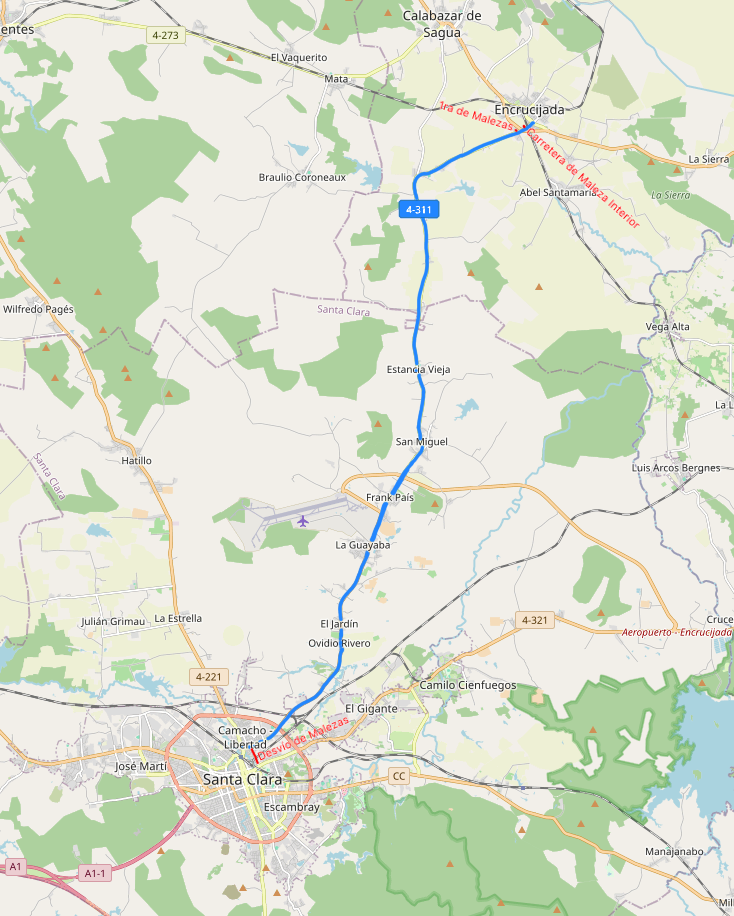
- Highway 4–311 seen in blue with related routes in red labeled with their names

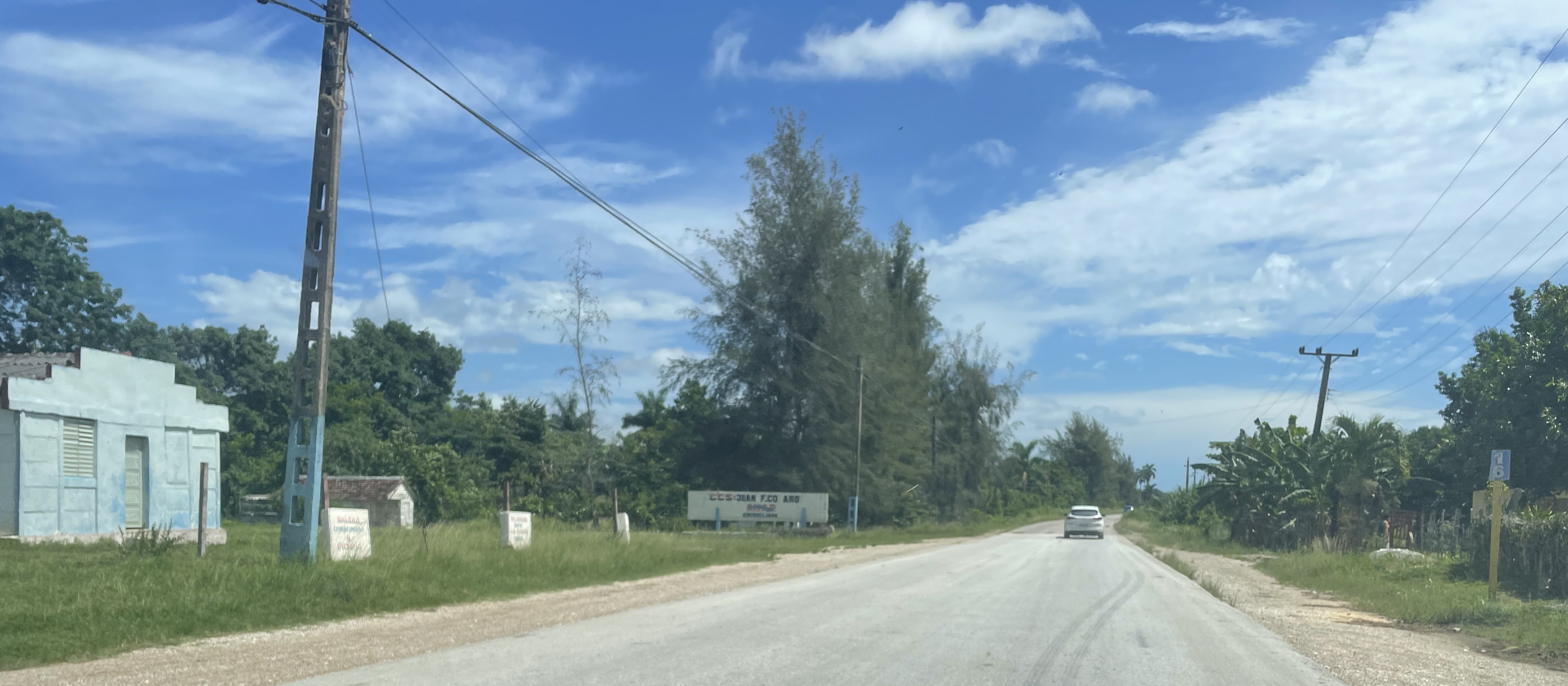
- Kilometer 16 in San Francisco, Encrucijada

Major junctions
- South end: Avenida Eduardo Chibás in Santa Clara
- Santa Clara Beltway in Santa Clara; Original Road to Santa Clara Airport in Oropesa; Road to Santa Clara Airport, near Frank Pais; Encrucijada Beltway (CN) in Encrucijada
- North end: 4–I–3 (Calzada de Maceo) in Encrucijada

Location
- Country: Cuba
- Provinces: Villa Clara
- Municipalities: Santa Clara, Encrucijada

Highway system
- Roads in Cuba

The Road of Malezas (Spanish: Carretera de Malezas), also spelled Road of Maleza (Spanish: Carretera de Maleza), is a north–south Cuban state highway connecting the municipalities of Santa Clara to Encrucijada in Villa Clara Province.

== History ==
In the 1960s, the roadway was known as the 4–19.

In April 2022, villages along the road have been without public transportation for over a month, with an estimate of 30,000 residents in the towns of Jardin, Padagogico, Las Flores, and El Sopapo, due to a fuel crisis in Cuba so bad that it's being compared to the Special Period.

In June 2024, at 2:00am, a tourist bus hit a loose cow on the road, killing it. This type of accident is apparently common on this road, especially late at night and early in the morning.

== Route ==
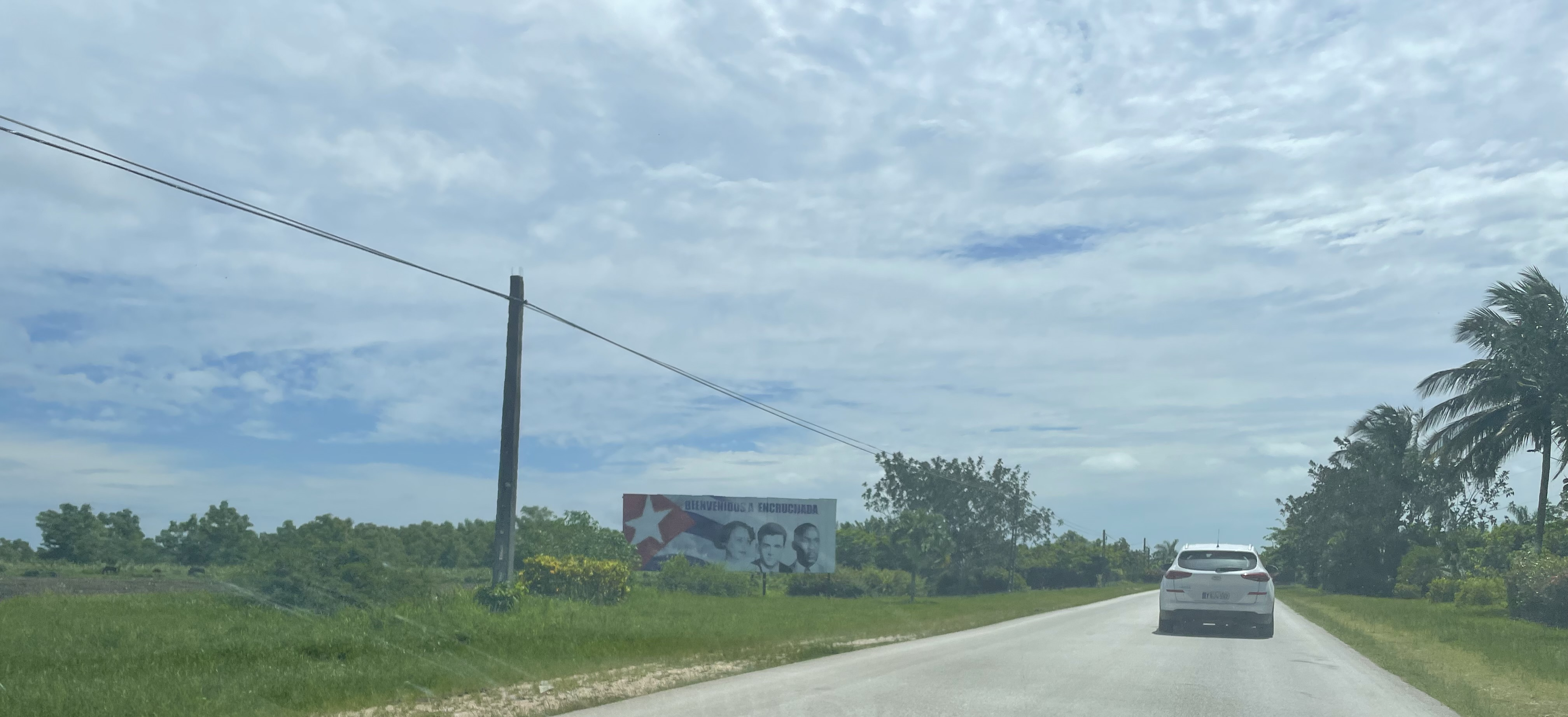
4-311 about when entering Encrucijada Sur

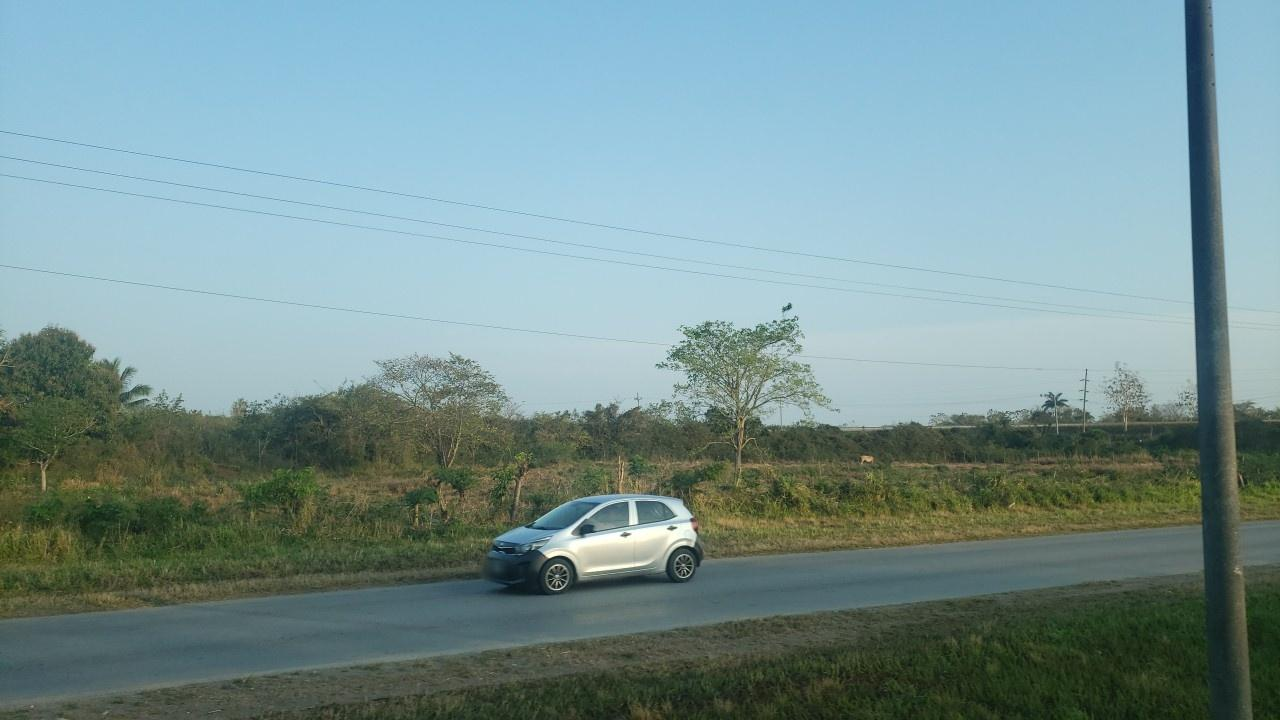
4-311 seen when entering the exit to the Road to Santa Clara Airport

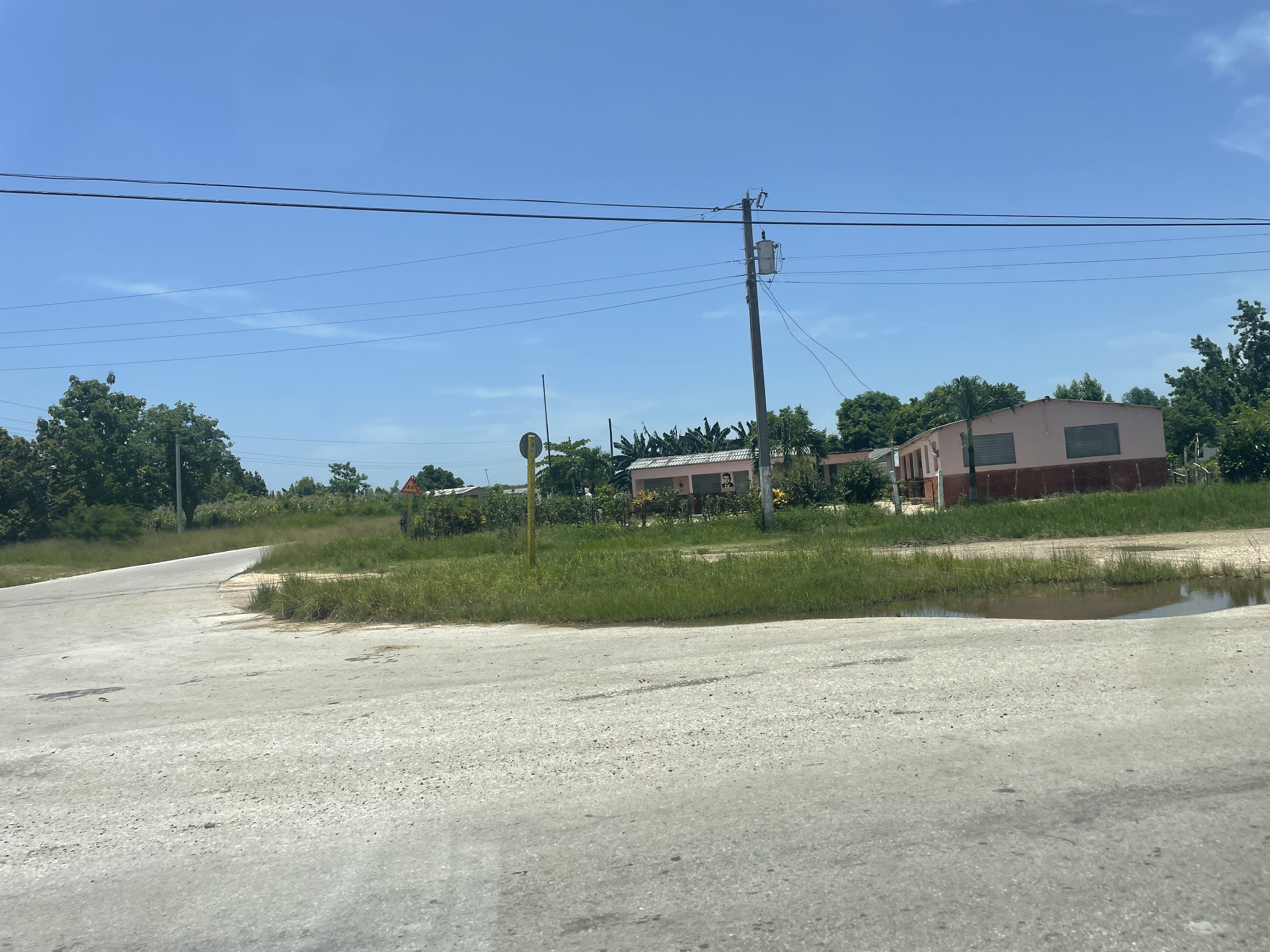
Junction with the Road to Calabazar with a school in Dos Hermanas on the right

The road starts in the city of Santa Clara from Calle Pazos and the junction with the Avenida Eduardo Chibas, which later goes into the Road to Sagua. It has a redlight at the junction with the Santa Clara Beltway, and after goes above the railway lines north of Santa Clara, where its known as the El Elevado Bridge. It goes through several villages, then has two junctions to get the Abel Santamaría Airport, then continues across two more villages, and then enters the municipality of Encrucijada, where it continues across three more villages until the town of Dos Hermanas, where it has a junction going to Calabazar de Sagua, and the road continues until Encrucijada, going under the newly made Encrucijada Beltway (part of the Circuito Norte), the road to Abel Santamaria, and finally ends at the Calzada de Maceo as the 6ta Avenida Sur.

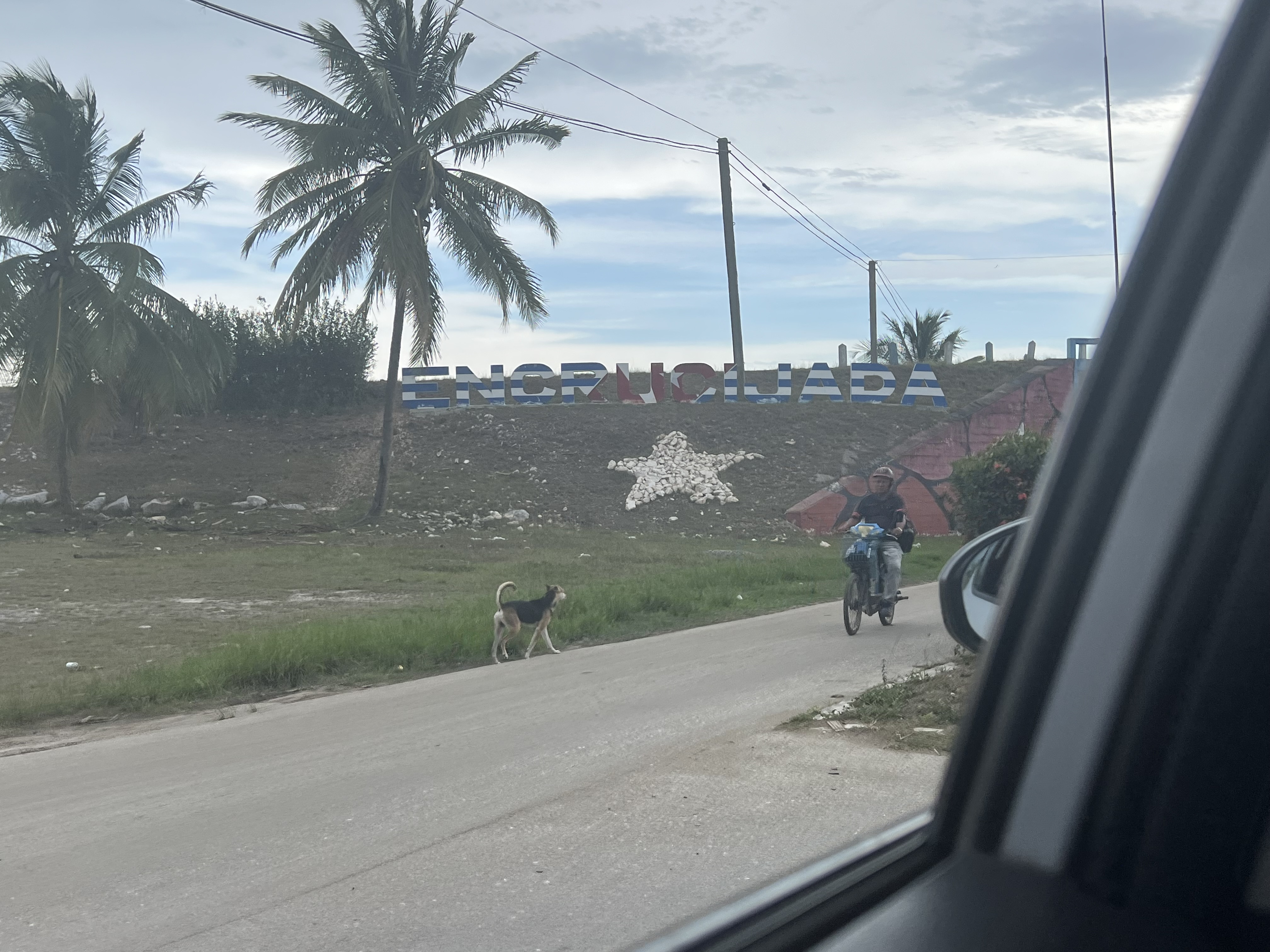
Art of Encrucijada seen on the junction with the Encrucijada Beltway (CN)

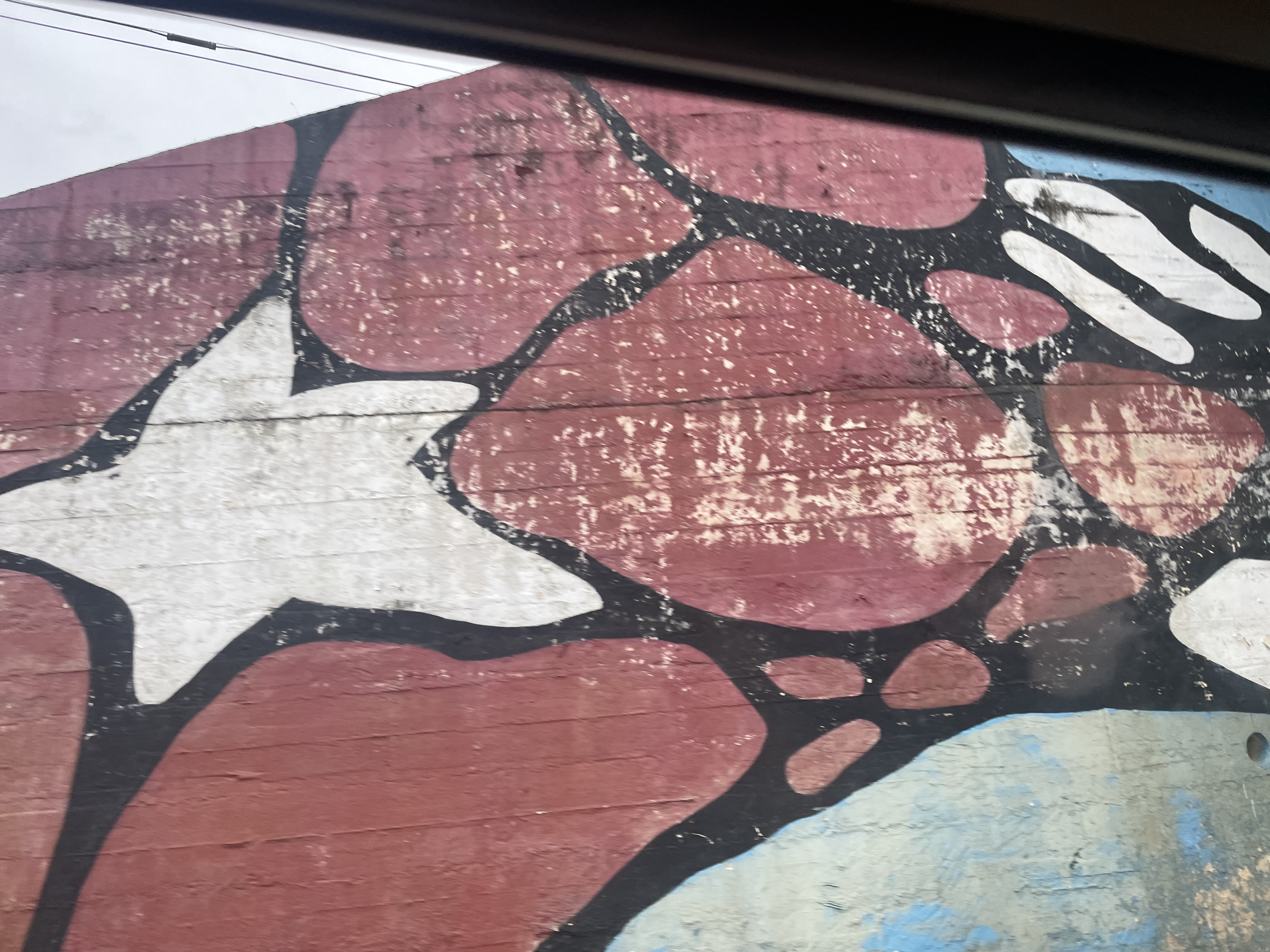
Mural seen under the Encrucijada Beltway (CN) bridge on northbound

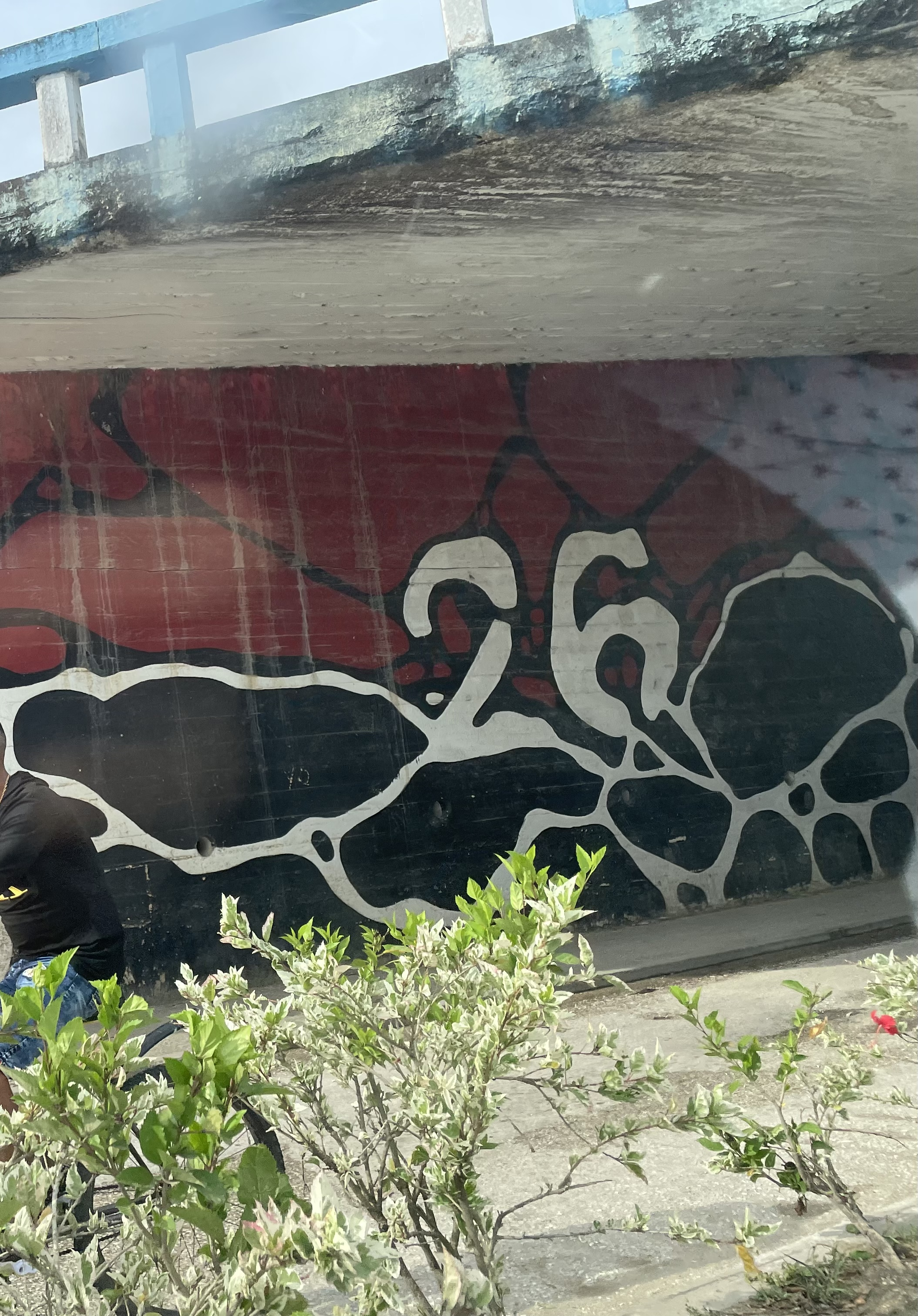
Mural seen under the Encrucijada Beltway (CN) bridge on southbound

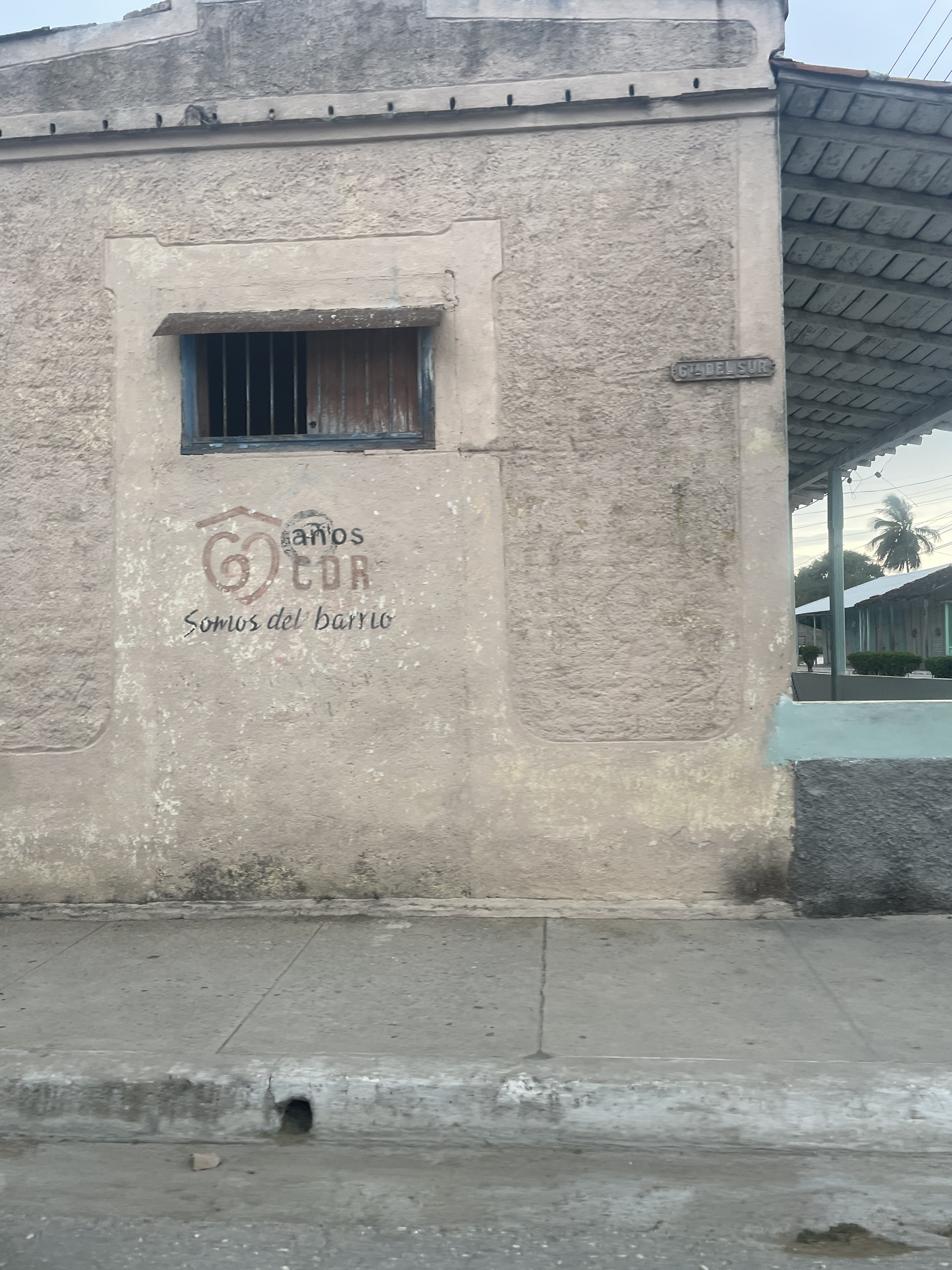
6ta del Sur street sign seen when its a part of the 4–311

The section going from the Santa Clara Beltway to El Elevado is known to be full of potholes and mud, causing four people traveling in a privately owned Lada to crash into a traffic sign on the road.

Municipality	Location	km	mi	Destination	Notes
Santa Clara	Santa Clara	0.00	0.00	Avenida Eduardo Chibás – Cifuentes, Sagua La Grande	
Santa Clara	Santa Clara	0.20	0.12	Calle 5ta	
Santa Clara	Santa Clara	0.29	0.18	Calle C (Detour of Malezas)	
Santa Clara	Santa Clara	0.83	0.52	Calle 17	
Santa Clara	Santa Clara	0.98	0.61	Calle 19	
Santa Clara	Santa Clara	1.17	0.73	Callejón del Prado	
Santa Clara	Santa Clara	1.50	0.93	Santa Clara Beltway / To 4–N–1 (Carretera Central)	
Santa Clara	Santa Clara	2.04	1.27	El Elevado Bridge	
Santa Clara		4.17	2.59	Ciudad Escolar Ernesto Che Guevara	
Santa Clara		4.25	2.64	Club of the MININT	
Santa Clara	Ovidio Rivero	5.47	3.40	Calle 7ma	
Santa Clara	El Jardin	6.08	3.78	Calle 14	
Santa Clara	El Jardin	6.11	3.80	Calle 8va	
Santa Clara		6.95	4.32		
Santa Clara	Parroquia	7.32	4.55	Calle 4ta	
Santa Clara	Las Minas	7.68	4.77		
Santa Clara	Malezas	8.73	5.42	Calle F	
Santa Clara	La Guayaba	8.99	5.59	Calle H	
Santa Clara	La Guayaba	9.04	5.62	Calle J	
Santa Clara	La Guayaba	9.11	5.66	Calle K – Los Lagos	
Santa Clara	La Guayaba	9.17	5.70	Santa Clara Air Base	
Santa Clara	La Guayaba	9.26	5.75	Santa Clara Air Base	
Santa Clara		9.40	5.84	Los Lagos	
Santa Clara	Oropesa	10.33	6.42	Calle 5ta	
Santa Clara	Oropesa	10.36	6.44	Original Road to the Airport – Abel Santamaría Airport	Official address is kilometer 11 of the Road of Malezas
Santa Clara	Frank Pais	10.97	6.82	Calle 6ta	
Santa Clara	Frank Pais	11.5	7.15		
Santa Clara	Frank Pais	11.12	6.91	Calle 12	
Santa Clara	Frank Pais	11.19	6.95	Calle 14 Oeste	
Santa Clara	Frank Pais	11.25	6.99	Club of the FAR	
Santa Clara	Frank Pais	11.60	7.21	Loma La Bayoya	
Santa Clara	Frank Pais	11.83	7.35	Road to Santa Clara Airport – Abel Santamaría Airport, Camajuaní, Cayo Santa María	Interchange; Unofficial entrance to Road to Santa Clara Airport Westbound; Unofficial exit from Road to Santa Clara Airport Eastbound
Santa Clara		12.08	7.51		
Santa Clara	San Miguel	12.85	7.98		
Santa Clara	San Miguel	12.99	8.07	Calle A	
Santa Clara	San Miguel	13.32	8.28	Calle 8va	
Santa Clara	San Miguel	13.77	8.56	Camino los Cocos	
Santa Clara	Estancia Vieja	15.92	9.89	Calle 6ta	
Santa Clara	Estancia Vieja	15.98	9.93	Calle 7ma	
Encrucijada	San Francisco	18.01	11.19	To Military Base	
Encrucijada	El Chivo	19.71	12.25	Calle C	
Encrucijada	Marties de Angola	21.66	13.46	Calle 4ta	
Encrucijada	Marties de Angola	21.85	13.58	Calle 2da	
Encrucijada		22.21	13.80	Road to Braulio Coroneaux	
Encrucijada	Dos Hermanas	22.88	14.22	Road to Calabazar – Calabazar de Sagua	
Encrucijada	Encrucijada	26.74	16.62	Road to El Mosquito – El Mosquito	
Encrucijada	Encrucijada	26.90	16.71	Circunvalación de Encrucijada (Circuito Norte)	Interchange
Encrucijada	Encrucijada	27.14	16.86	Avenida 8va del Este – Abel Santamaria	
Encrucijada	Encrucijada	27.25	16.93	Avenida 4ta del Este	
Encrucijada	Encrucijada	27.37	17.01	4–I–3(Calzada de Maceo)	Continues as 6ta Avenida Sur

== Related roads ==
=== Desvío de Maleza ===
The Desvío de Maleza (Detour of Maleza), also known as Calle C, is a north-south street in Santa Clara. It starts at the Road of Malezas, heading south until the Avenida Liberación.

=== 1ra de Maleza ===
The 1ra de Maleza (1st of Maleza) is a north-south street right before entering the town limits of Encrucijada. It is unpaved starting from the south from the Road of Malezas and heading north with no outlet.

=== Carretera de Maleza Interior ===
The Carretera de Maleza Interior (Inner Road of Malezas) is a north-south street in the town of Encrucijada. It is unpaved starting from the south from the Road of Malezas and heading north with no outlet.
