= Flight 387 =

Flight 387 or Flight 387 may refer to:

- Cebu Pacific Flight 387, a Douglas DC-9 that crashed on the slopes of Mount Sumagaya in the Philippines in 1998
- JetBlue Flight 387, a 2016 flight from the United States to Cuba which marked the first scheduled commercial service between the two countries since the 1960s
