= Dolores, Caibarién =

Dolores
- Ward
- Consejo Popular 5
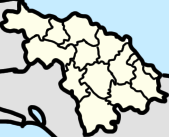
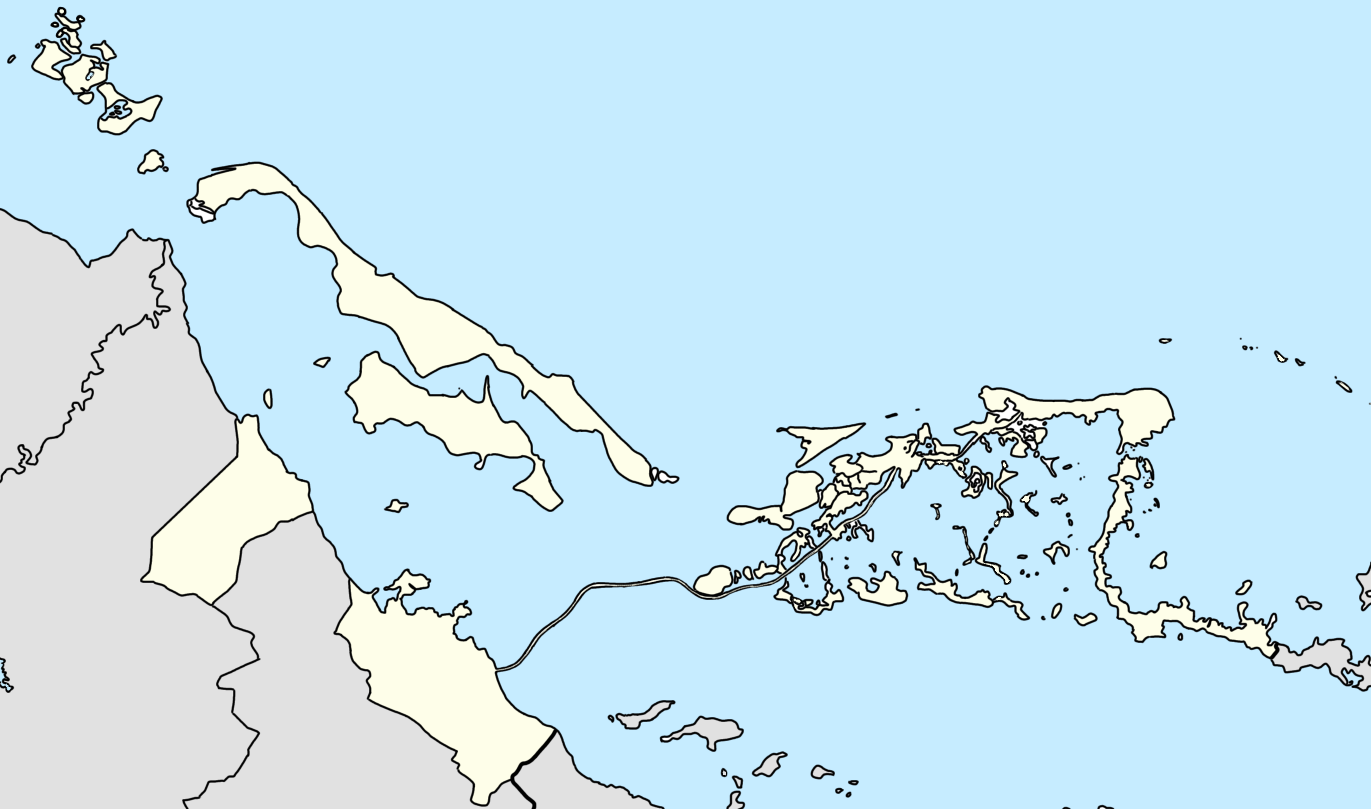
- Location within Cuba Location within Villa Clara Province Location within Caibarién
- Coordinates: 22°25′46″N 79°25′38″W
- Country: Cuba
- Province: Villa Clara
- Municipality: Caibarién

Government
  - President: Alberto Concepción Cruz

Area
  - Land: 0.84 km^{2} (0.32 sq mi)

Population (14 September 2012)
  - Total: 1,533
  - Density: 1,825/km^{2} (4,730/sq mi)

Dolores, officially Ward 5, (Consejo Popular 5), is a rural settlement and ward located on the Circuito Norte in Caibarién, Cuba. It is located about 10 kilometers from the municipal seat of Caibarién.

== History ==
The Dolores sugar mill (Ingenio Dolores) was constructed in 1872, which employed slaves for agricultural and industrial purposes. The mill currently has legends and traditions based around it, which reference the violence that the slaves had to endure.

== Geography ==
The settlement is located at the junction of the Circuito Norte and the unpaved Remedios–Dolores Road (officially the 4–511). North on the Circuito Norte is the Cayo Santa María Causeway to the tourist area of Cayo Santa María. West on the Road to Remedios leads to the town of Guajabana.

The Ward of Dolores contains the barrio of Cambaito.
