= JetBlue Flight 387 =

American passenger flight to Cuba

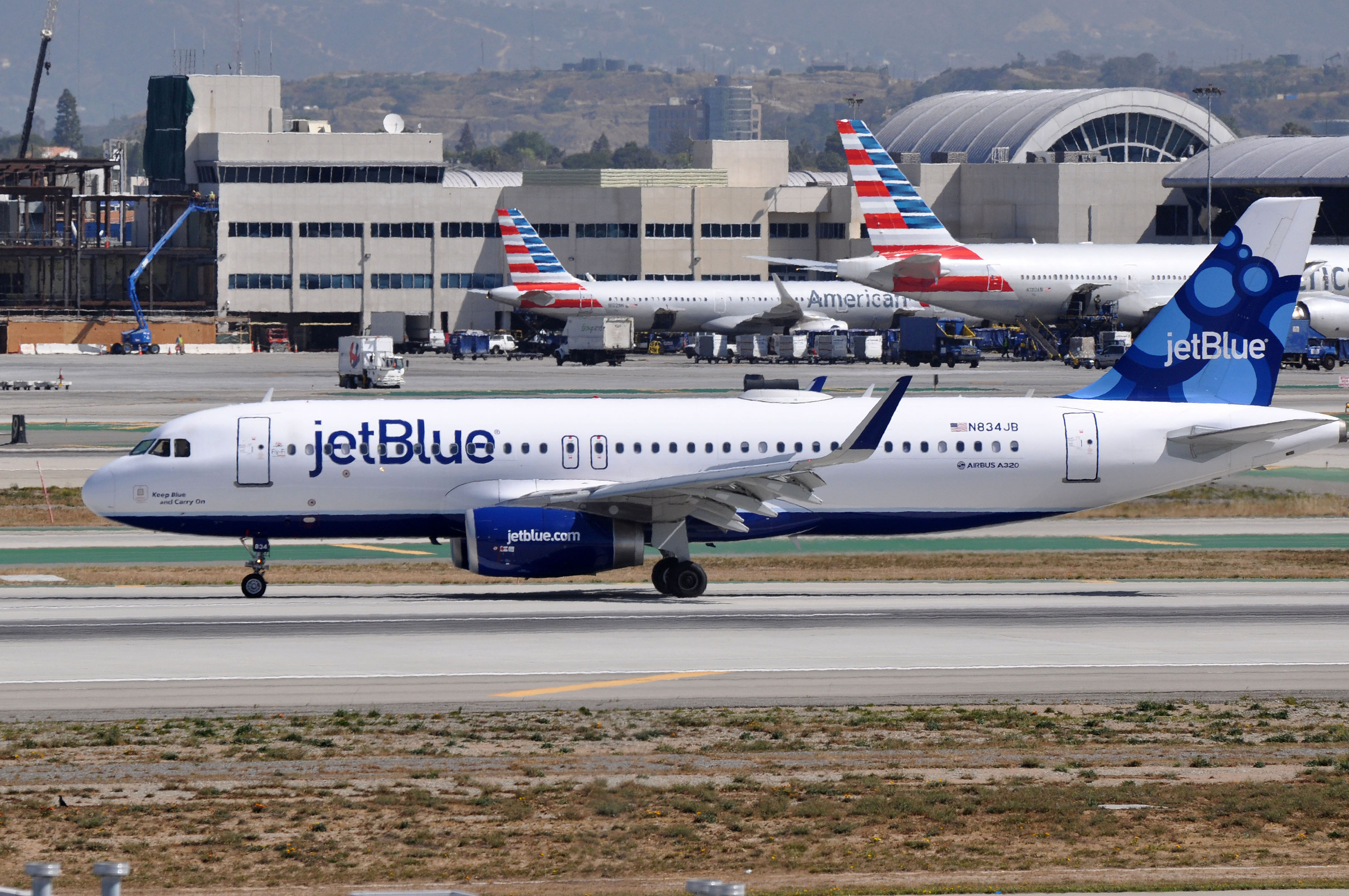
The aircraft involved, seen a year before the flight occurred

JetBlue Flight 387 was a scheduled international commercial passenger flight from Fort Lauderdale–Hollywood International Airport in Broward County, Florida to Abel Santamaría Airport in Santa Clara, Cuba operated by JetBlue, an American low-cost carrier.

The route's first flight on August 31, 2016, was the first regularly scheduled American passenger flight to Cuba since 1961. The Airbus A320 (N834JB Keep Blue and Carry On) departed Fort Lauderdale shortly before 10:00 am and landed in Santa Clara at approximately 11:00 am local time.

== Significance ==
On December 17, 2014, a change in Cuba–United States relations was announced by U.S. President Barack Obama and Cuban President Raúl Castro, with the former declaring that trade and travel sanctions failed to bring democracy to Cuba and that getting the communist regime in Havana to change its political behavior is better served by economic and diplomatic engagement rather than isolation. In the context of the Cuban thaw, Washington and Havana announced an agreement to resume regular airline service to Cuba in December 2015, with the agreement coming into effect in February 2016. Jimmy Carter had allowed charter flights in 1977, but these were cumbersome and very chaotic with a lot of paperwork, so the US Department of Transportation found it necessary to enter into negotiations with Cuban civil aviation authorities to revive regular airline service between the two countries to make it much easier for Americans to travel to Cuba for non-touristic reasons.
