= Las Brujas Airport (Cuba) =

Airport serving Cayo Santa María, Cuba

- IATA: BWW; ICAO: MUBR

Summary
- Airport type: Public
- Operator: ECASA S.A.
- Location: Cayo Santa María, Cuba
- Elevation AMSL: 4 m / 13 ft
- Coordinates: 22°37′16″N 079°08′50″W

Map
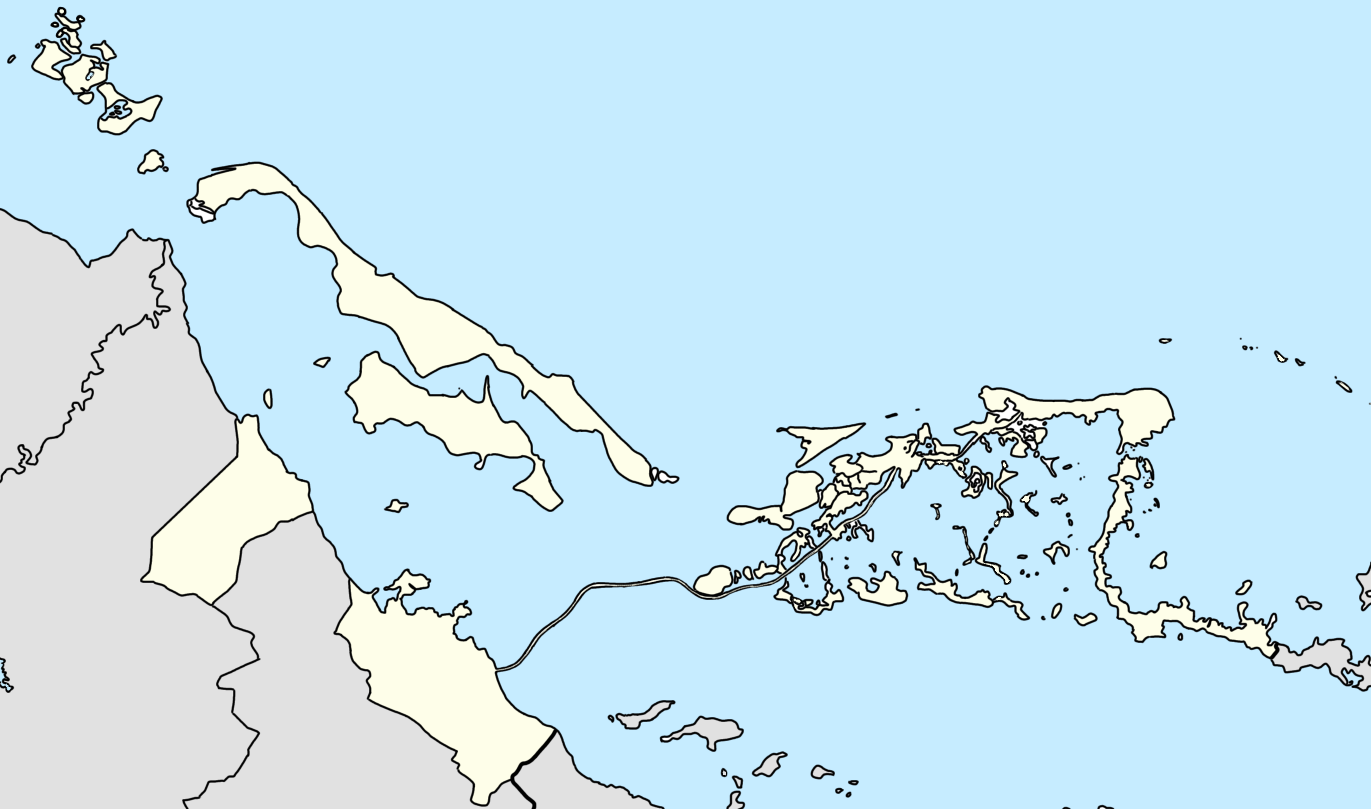

Runways
Direction	Length		Surface
Direction	m	ft	Surface
09/27	1,803	5,915	Asphalt
- Source:Instituto de Aeronáutica Civil de Cuba, DAFIF

Las Brujas Airport (IATA: BWW, ICAO: MUBR) is a Cuban airport serving Cayo Santa María, a resort island in the municipality of Caibarién, Villa Clara Province.

== Facilities ==
The airport resides at an elevation of 4 m (13 ft) above mean sea level. It has one runway designated 09/27 with an asphalt surface measuring 1,803 m × 44 m (5,915 ft × 144 ft).

== Airlines and destinations ==
As of December 2024, there are no scheduled services at the airport.
