= Crucero Carmita =

- Village
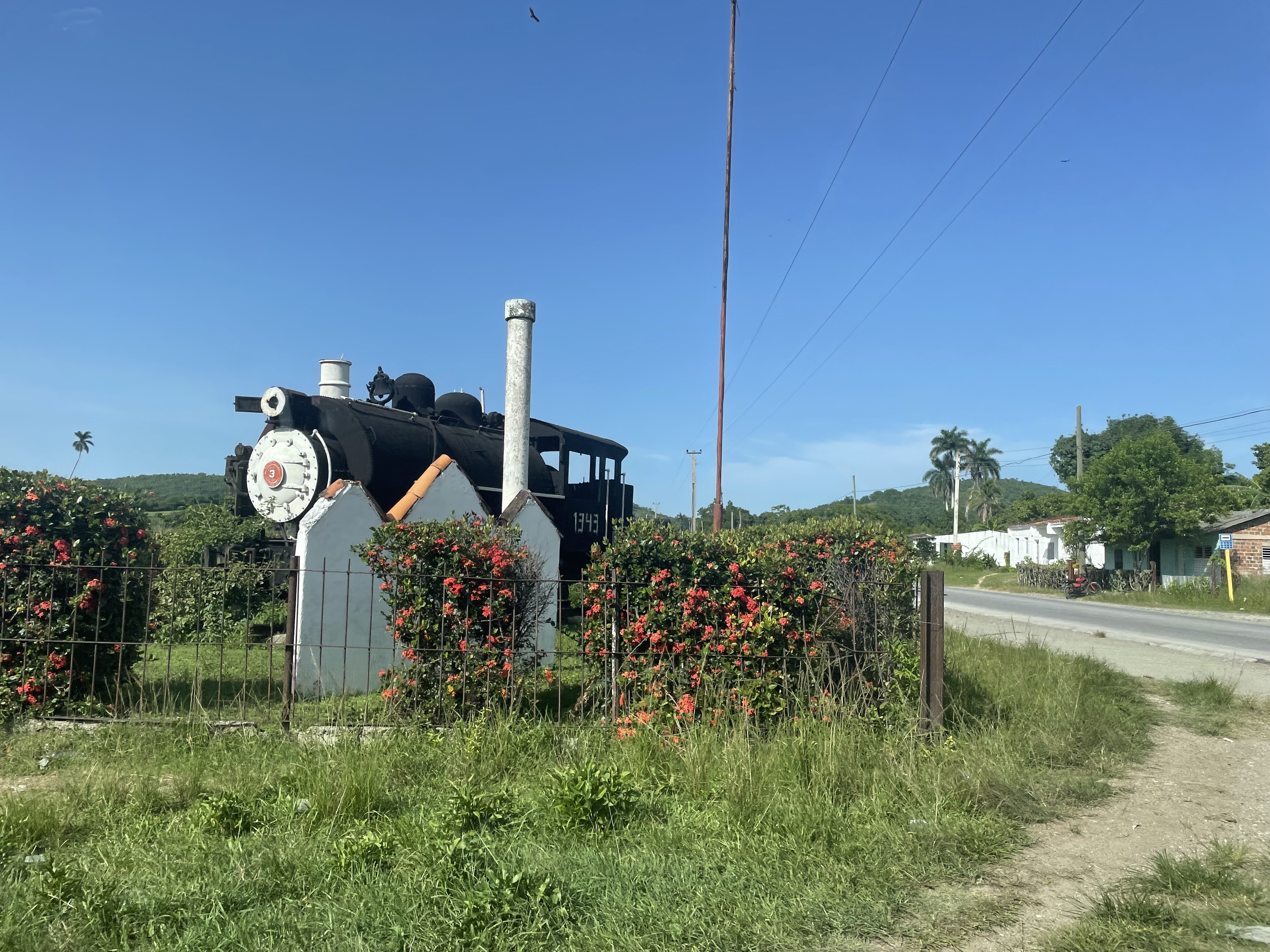
- Train #1343 attraction, with the Santa Clara–Caibarién Road in the background

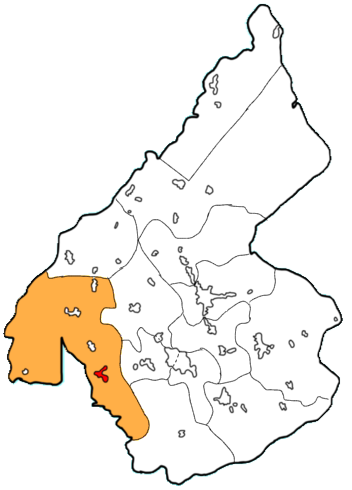
- Map of Crucero Carmita (red) in Luis Arcos Bergnes (orange) in Camajuani.

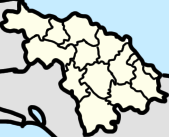
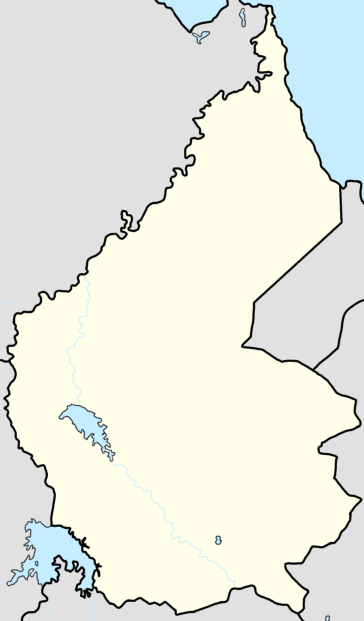
- Crucero Carmita in Cuba Crucero Carmita (Villa Clara Province) Crucero Carmita (Camajuaní)
- Coordinates: 22°27′24″N 79°47′36″W
- Country: Cuba
- Province: Villa Clara
- Municipality: Camajuaní
- Ward: Carmita
- Elevation: 78 m (256 ft)

Population
  - Total: 704
- Postal Code: 52500

Crucero Carmita also known as El Crucero de Carmita is a village in the ward of Luis Arcos Bergnes (or Carmita), Camajuaní, Villa Clara, Cuba. It had a population of 704 people and has 261 houses. Nearby towns are Fusté, San José, Dolores, Corona, Aguijón, and Santana.

== Location ==
The town is located on the junction of the Road to Luis Arcos Bergnes, to Carmita and Vega Alta, and the Road of Camajuaní. To the north is the settlement of Fusté, to the west is the town of El Berro in the municipality of Santa Clara, and to the east is the settlement of Santa Fé and the town of Blanquizal. In the center of the town is the #1343 Old Train of the former Central Carmita, a sugar mill in Luis Arcos Bergnes, signaling the start of the road to Carmita.

On the southern part of the town is the neighborhood of Reparto Nuevo (New Reparto), with it also having Zone 52 of Camajuaní. On the north part is the reparto of Reparto Viejo (Old Reparto), west of the Road to Luis Arcos Bergnes.

== Education ==
There is one school in Crucero Carmita, which is the Julio Pino Primary School.

== Economy ==
According at the DMPF (Departamento de control de la Dirección Municipal de Planificación Física or Management Control Department Municipal Physical Planning in English) of Camajuani, Crucero Carmita is a settlement linked to sources of employment or economic development.

The town has a pharmacy, named the Farmacia del Crucero.
