= Abel Santamaría Airport =

Airport in Cuba

Abel Santamaría Airport Aeropuerto Abel Santamaría
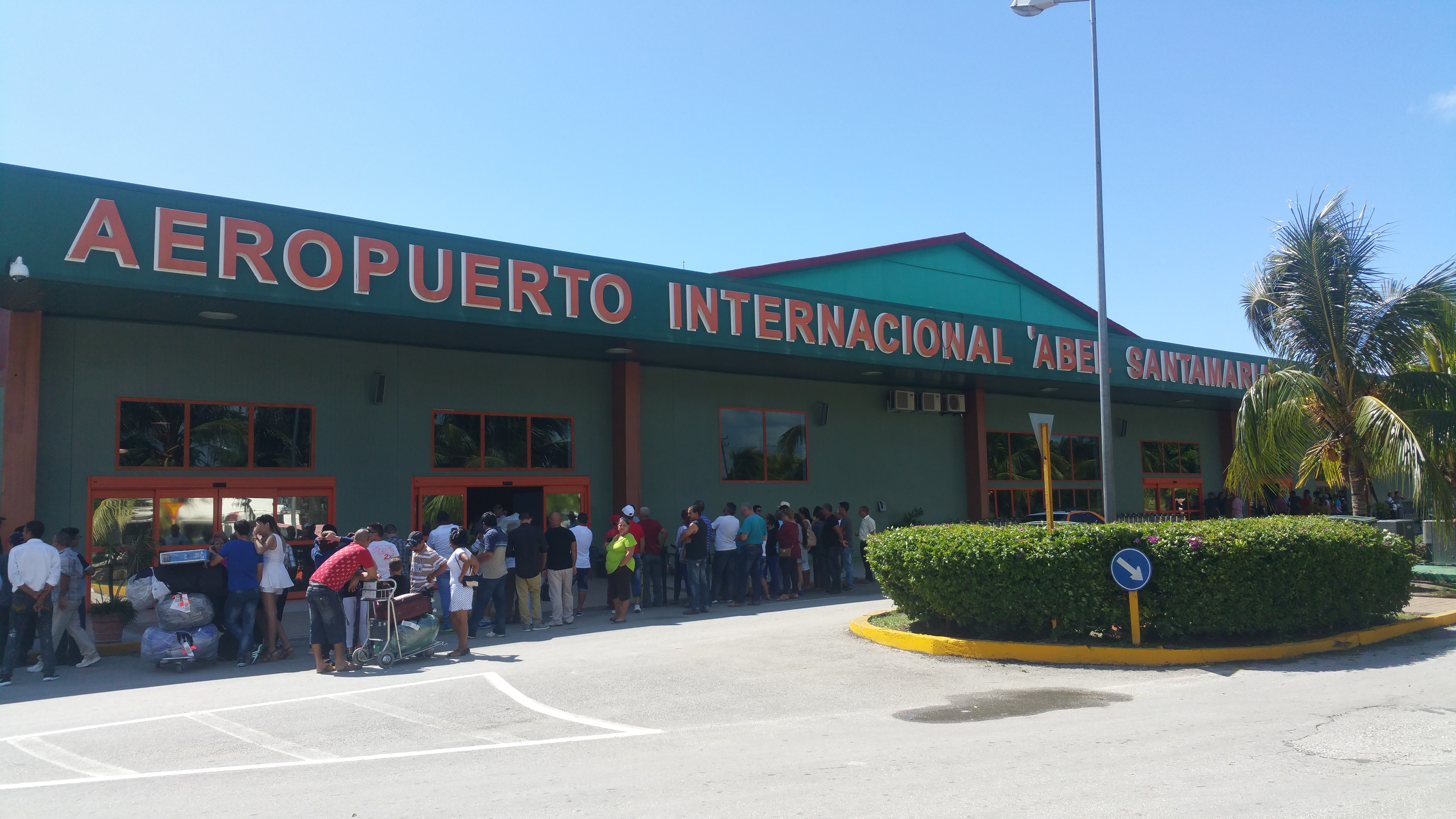
- IATA: SNU; ICAO: MUSC

Summary
- Airport type: Military/Public
- Operator: ECASA
- Serves: Villa Clara Province, Cienfuegos Province, and Sancti Spiritus Province in Cuba
- Location: Aeropuerto Ward, Santa Clara, Cuba
- Elevation AMSL: 103 m (338 ft)
- Coordinates: 22°29′32″N 079°56′37″W
- Website: santaclara.airportcuba.net

Map
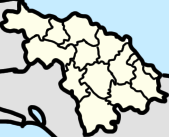
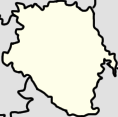
- Location in Cuba MUSC (Villa Clara Province) MUSC (Santa Clara)

Runways
Direction	Length		Surface
Direction	m	ft	Surface
08/26	3,017	9,898	Asphalt
- Source: Aerodrome chart

Abel Santamaría Airport (Spanish: Aeropuerto "Abel Santamaría") (IATA: SNU, ICAO: MUSC) is an international airport serving Santa Clara, the capital city of the Villa Clara Province in Cuba. It was named after the Cuban revolutionary Abel Santamaría. The airport is the main entry point for tourists travelling to Cayo Santa María and the other keys on the northern coast of the province.

== History ==
On 31 August 2016, JetBlue Flight 387 from Fort Lauderdale, Florida, landed at the airport to commence regular commercial flights between Fort Lauderdale and Santa Clara, the first commercial flight from the United States to Cuba in 54 years following the thaw in Cuba–United States relations.

== Facilities ==
=== Runway ===
The runway is 3,017 metres (9,898 ft) wide, being the 9th biggest of the country.

=== Air Base ===
The airport was previously used as a Cuban Revolutionary Armed Forces air base bomber and fighter aircraft. It is currently being used by Cuban Revolutionary Armed Forces as a helicopter squadron air base, flying Mi-17 helicopters in the transport role and Mi-24/35 helicopters in the troop support role.

== Airlines and destinations ==
The following airlines operate regular scheduled and charter flights at Abel Santamaría Airport:

Airlines	Destinations
American Airlines	Miami
