= Cayo Santa María =

- Resort island and village
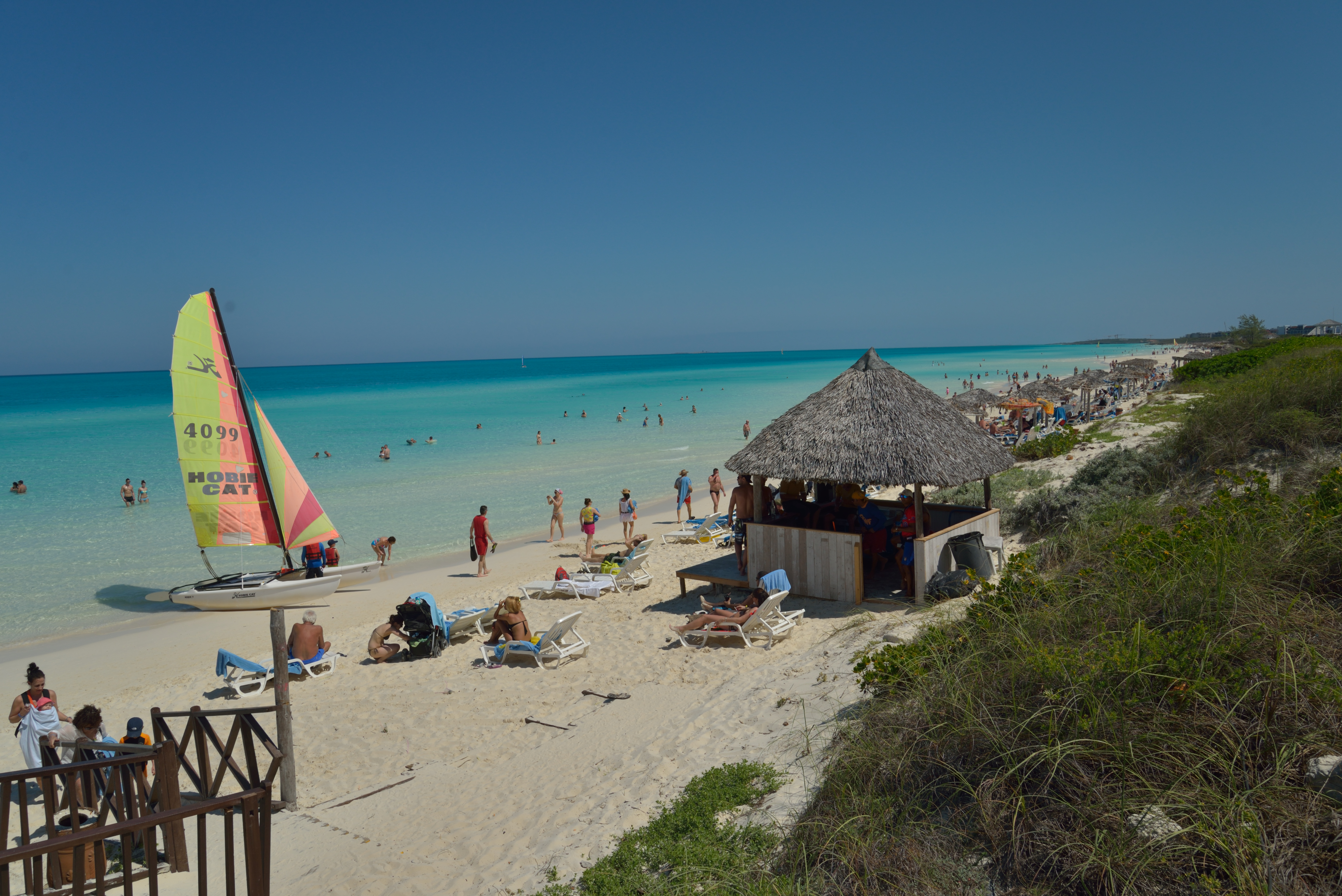
- A beach in Cayo Santa Maria

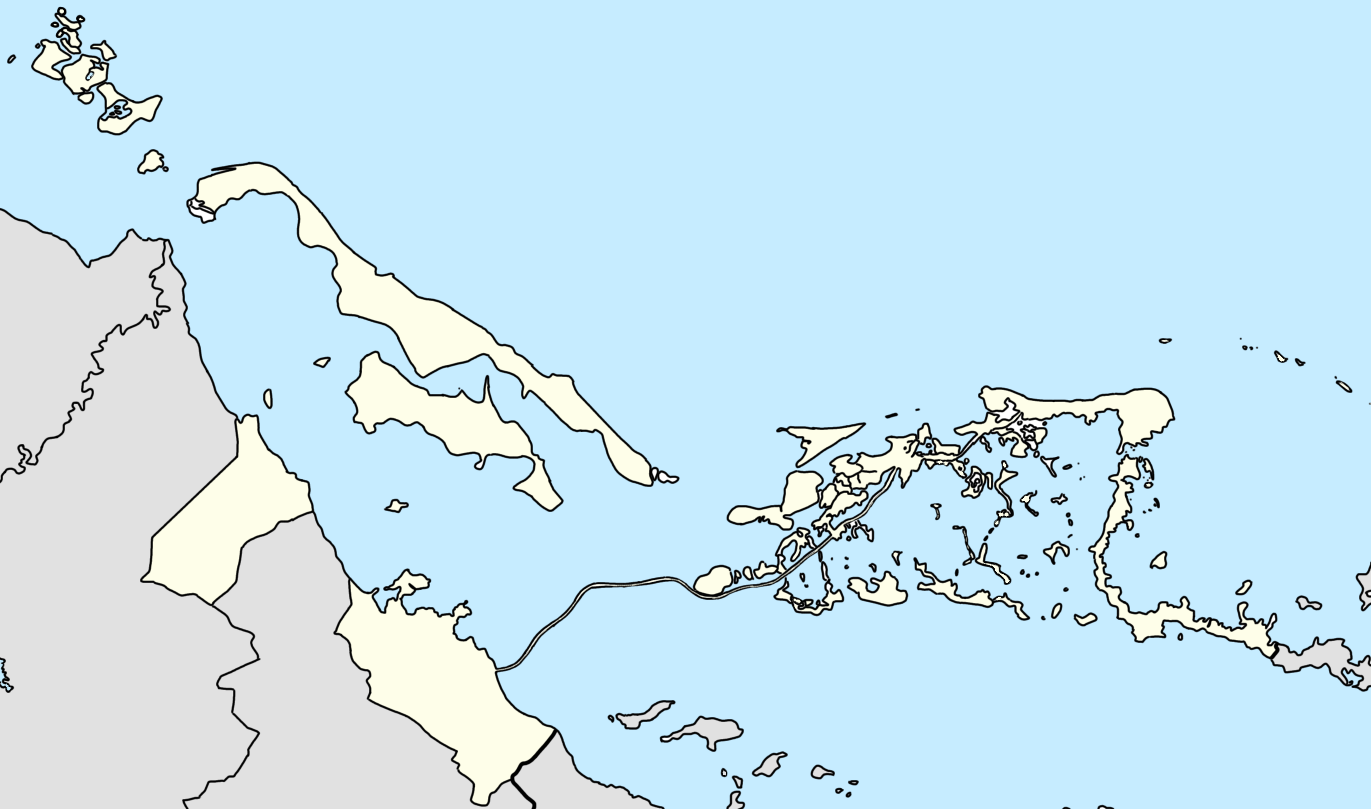
- Location of Cayo Santa Maria in Cuba Cayo Santa María (Caibarién)
- Coordinates: 22°39′27.72″N 79°0′0″W
- Country: Cuba
- Province: Villa Clara
- Municipality: Caibarién
- Elevation: 4 m (13 ft)
- Time zone: UTC-5 (EST)
- Area code: +53-43

Cayo Santa María (Saint Mary Cay or "Key") is an island off Cuba's north-central coast in the Jardines del Rey archipelago. The island is linked by road and bridge to the town of Caibarién on the main island. Cayo Santa María is well known for its white sand beaches and luxury all-inclusive resorts.

The name "Cayo Santa María" is also used to refer to the whole resort area, comprising a chain of three islands connected by a causeway.

In addition to its resorts, the cay features publicly accessible beaches and snorkeling spots that attract travelers seeking a more flexible, self-guided experience of the northern Cuban coast.

== Geography ==
The island is linked to the mainland near Caibarién by a 48 km causeway, part of the Road to Cayo Santa María, constructed between 1989 and 1999 by Campaña de Las Villas. The island is administered as part of Caibarién, a municipality of Villa Clara Province.

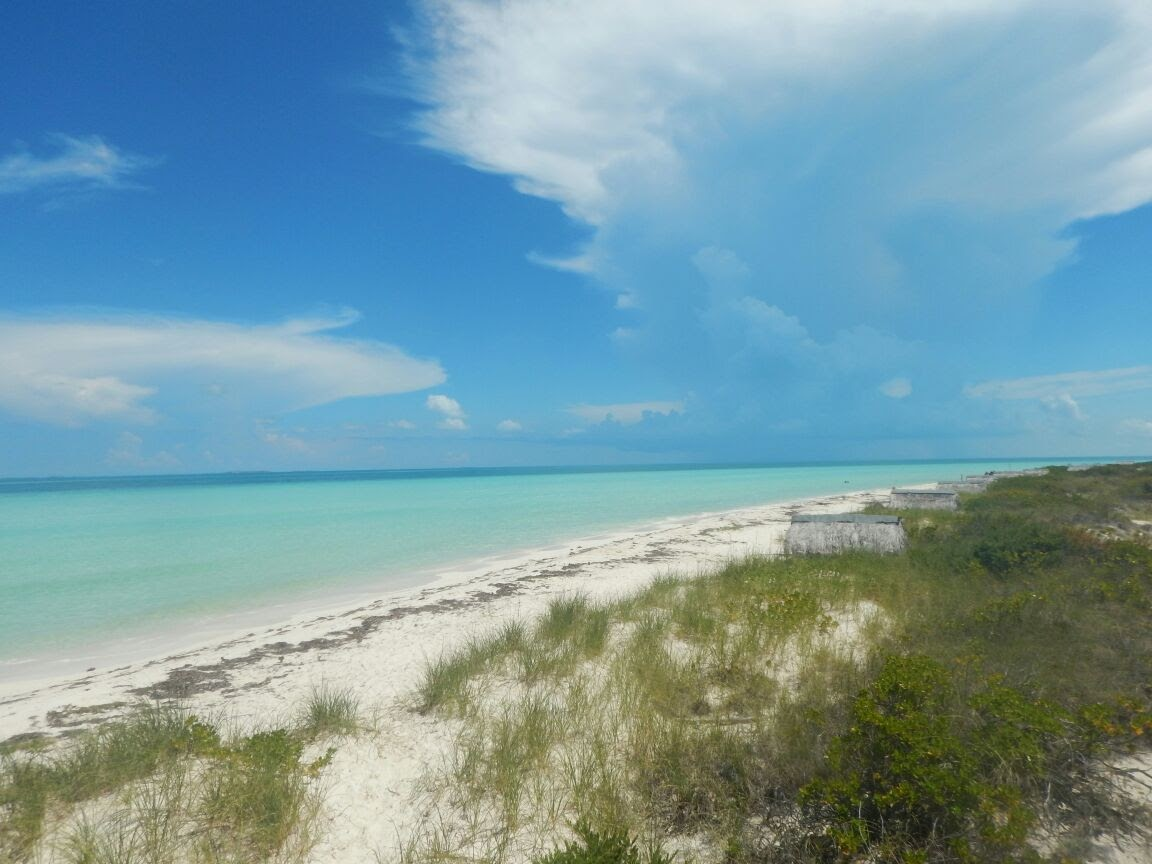
Cayo Santa Maria Beach, Cuba

== See also ==
- Cayo Caiman Grande de Santa María Lighthouse
