= Corona (Santa Clara) =

- Hamlet
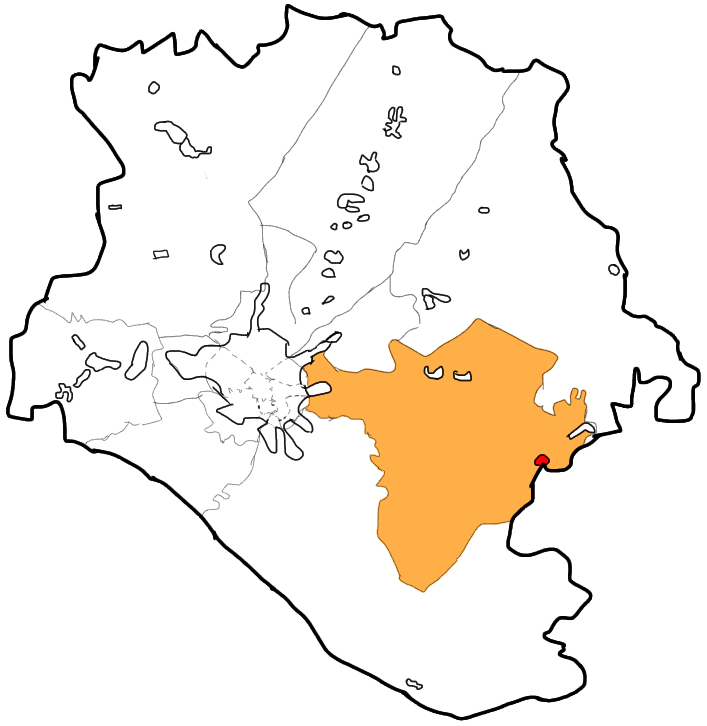
- La Corona (red) in Manajanabo (orange) in Santa Clara

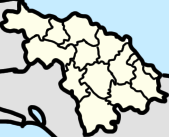
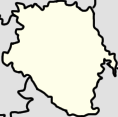
- Location within Cuba Location within Villa Clara Province Location within Santa Clara
- Coordinates: 22.3695724°N 79.8349816°W
- Country: Cuba
- Province: Villa Clara
- Municipality: Santa Clara
- Popular Council: Manajanabo

Population (2009)
  - Total: 263
- Postal code: 50100

Corona or La Corona is a hamlet in Manajanabo, Santa Clara, Villa Clara, Cuba.
