= Escambray (Santa Clara) =

- Ward (Consejo Popular)
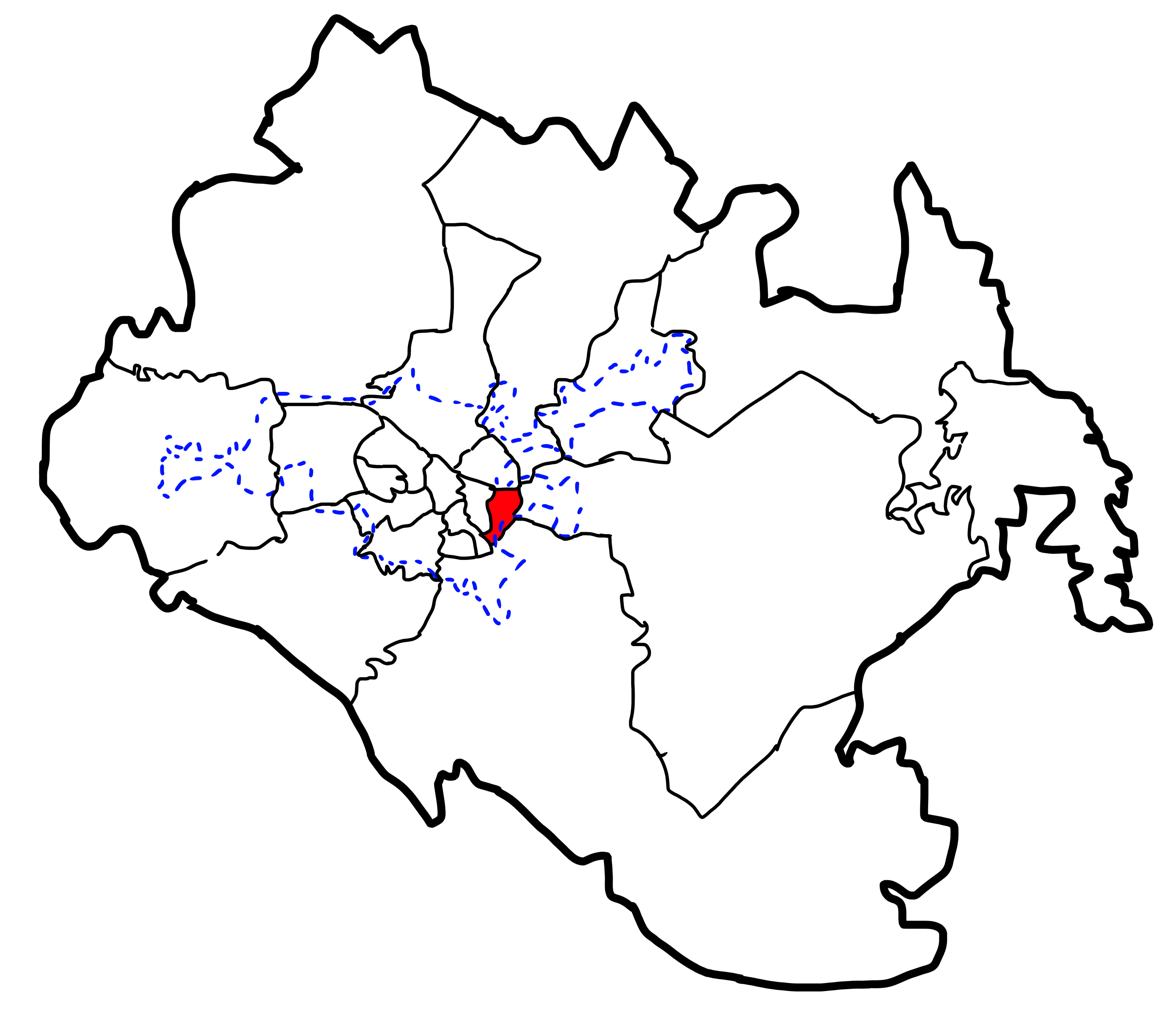
- Escambray (red) in the city of Santa Clara (blue) in the Municipality of Santa Clara

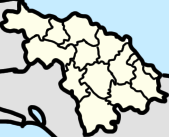
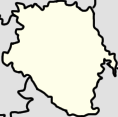
- Location in Cuba Escambray (Villa Clara Province) Escambray (Santa Clara)
- Coordinates: 22°23′52″N 79°56′55″W
- Country: Cuba
- Province: Villa Clara
- Municipality: Santa Clara

Escambray is a ward (consejo popular) and division (reparto) in the municipality of Santa Clara, Villa Clara, Cuba.

== Infrastructure ==
=== Infrastructural issues ===
In Escambray the Carretera Central and the Circunvalacion Vieja has frequent clogging.

== Economy ==
Escambray has Villa Clara's Radiocuba's Territorial Division. The Joven Club Facility of Santa Clara III is also located in Escambray.

== Education ==
Schools in Escambray include:

- Fe del Valle School for Adults
- Fe del Valle Ramos Secondary School
- Osvaldo Socarrás Martínez Primary School
- Mi Reyecillo Preschool
- Nené Traviesa Preschool
- Que siempre brille el Sol Preschool
- Seguidores del Ché Preschool

== Human resources ==
=== Public health ===
Escambray has 2 hospitals, which include:

- Provincial Pediatric University Hospital "José Luis Miranda"
- "Mariana Grajales" Provincial Gynecology-Obstetric Hospital

Escambray has one Optical, at Calle A e/ Ave. 26 de Julio y 7ma.

The Chiqui Gómez Polyclinic is in Escambray, being used by 46,733 people in the wards of Sakenaf, Vigía, Sandino, Escambray, Hospital, and Chambery.

=== Public essentials ===
In Escambray there is one pharmacy being Farmacia Comunitaria Normal Urbana del Reparto Escambray.

== Media ==
Escambray has the Cine Rotonda, as stated on the building as the "Centro Cultural Cienmatographico" or "Science Cultural Center".

== Sports ==
The "Mártires de Barbados" in Sandino serves people from the wards of Sandino, Vigia, Escambray, and Manajanabo.
