= Parque del Carmen =

Park in Santa Clara, Cuba

Coordinates: 22°24′41.8″N 79°58′1.85″W

Parque del Carmen (Carmen's Park) is a park in Santa Clara, Cuba, which honors the city's founding. It is located in the ward (reparto) El Carmen, not too far from Martyr's Park and the railway station.

== Overview ==
This old plaza hosts a small park centered by Saint Carmen's Church, a colonial building which originally also included the city's first school. In front of it, there is a gray marble monument surrounding a Tamarind tree indicating the foundation of Santa Clara. Each pillar supporting the bar represent the 7 families who moved to the site in 1689 from the town of Remedios near the north coast.

Next to the Foundation is another monument which honors Captain Roberto Rodriguez, known as “El Vaquerito” (little cowboy), a young soldier who died in the Battle of Santa Clara. When notified of his death, revolutionary leader Che Guevara said: “Today , it is like I have lost 300 men”.

== Gallery ==
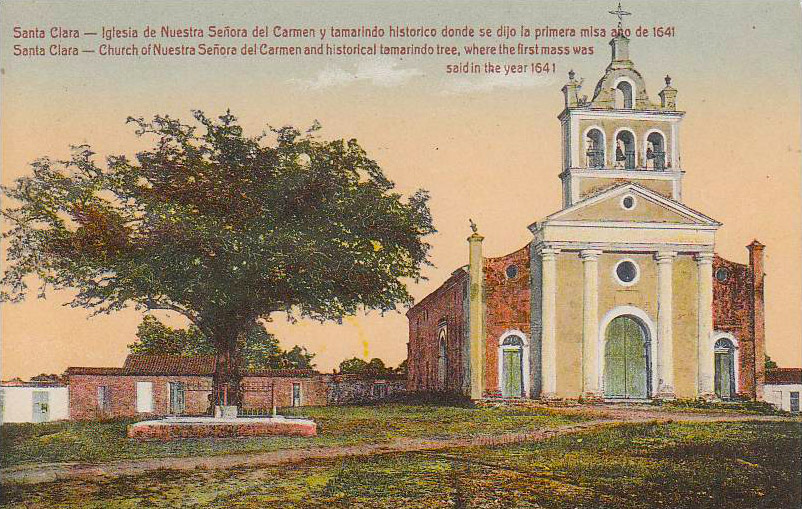
Historic postcard, c.1900, of Nuestra Señora del carmen church and the Tamarind tree monument, both built during the colonial times, the 2 first elements of the park.

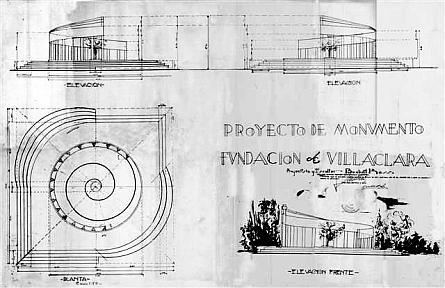
Historic document from 1950, representing the original project for the Foundation of Santa Clara city monument. Concept by artist Boaddil Ross Rodríguez.

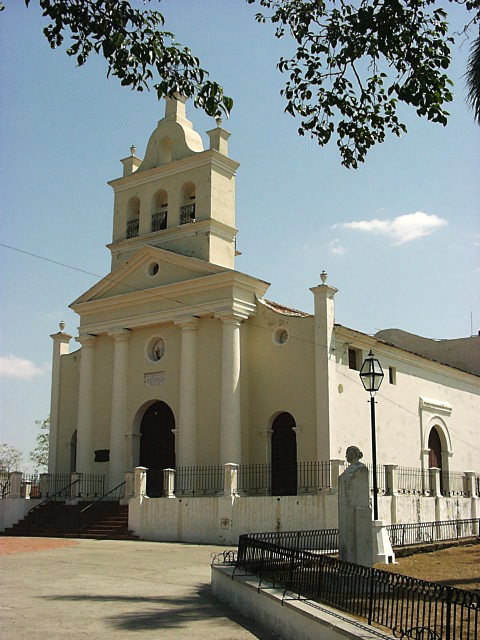
Iglesia del Carmen (Our Lady of Carmen's Church)

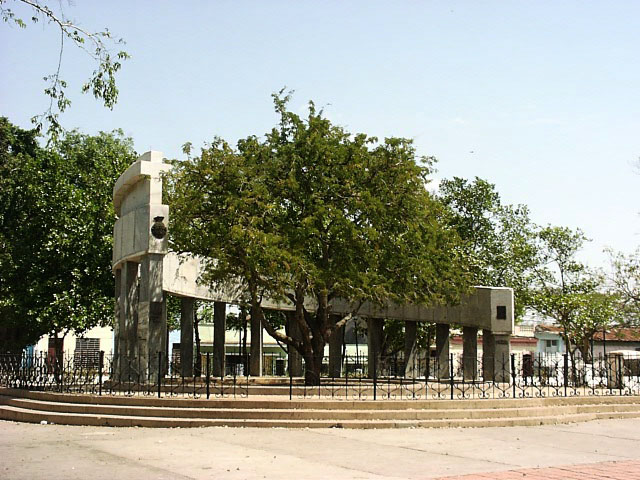
Foundation Monument

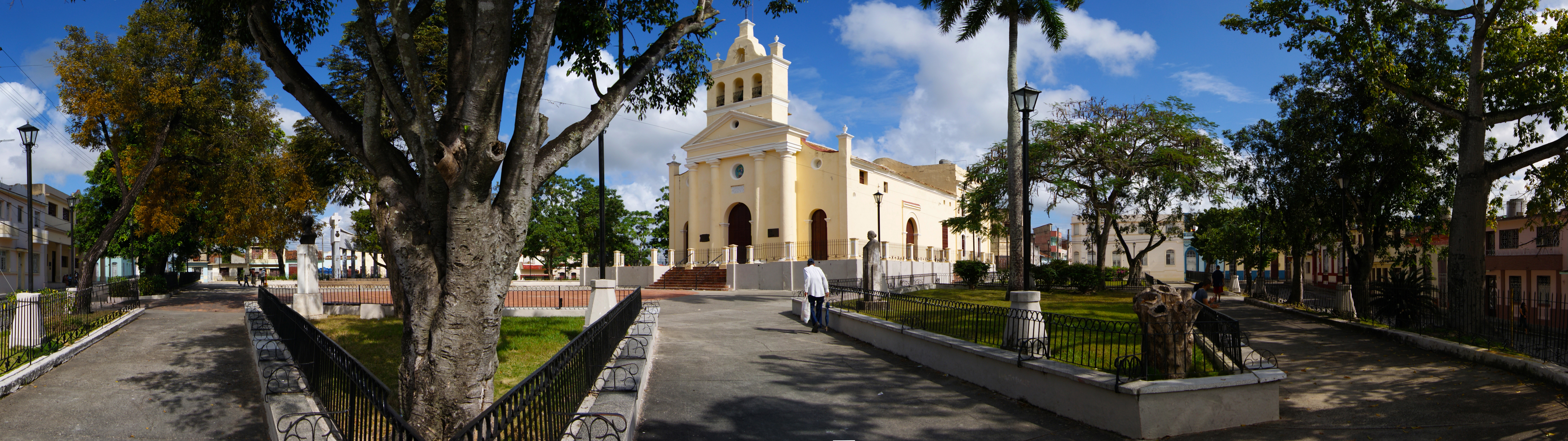
Panoramic view of Parque del Carmen. This landscaping was executed in 1952, 3, out of the 4 monuments in the park can be spot, including the Tamarind of foundation. Carmen church is one of the oldest ones in the city.

== Bibliography ==
- Garcia Gonzalez, Luis - Al pie del Tamarindo. (Colección Escambray, PUBLICIGRAF (R),1993)

== See also ==
- Parque Vidal
