= Coat of arms of Santa Clara, Cuba =

Coat of arms of Santa Clara

Versions
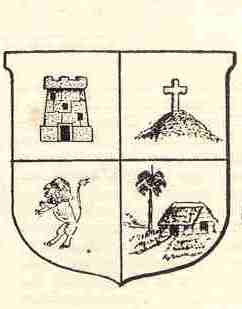
- Coat of arms donated in 1887 by Jose Machado
- Armiger: Municipality of Santa Clara
- Adopted: 1987

The coat of arms of Santa Clara, Cuba, is the official heraldic symbol of Santa Clara, Cuba. The first version of the shield was donated by José Machado in 1887. It was made official by the Municipal Assembly of People’s Power of Santa Clara in 1987.

== Official description ==
The Santa Clara official website describes the coat of arms as follows:

The shield had on the upper part the MURAL CROWN (city symbol) It is composed of two barracks, in the upper one there is a hill with a mountain cayo to which the remedian families headed to found the villa and the City Key, a piece that has millenously represented the cities and as it is purple means that the city without prejudice, it is obliged to protect The lower barracks are represented by a hut and a tamarind. The currencies were: Homeland, Religion, Family.

== Gallery ==
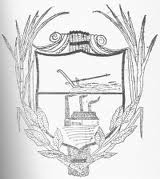
Blason of former Santa Clara Province after provincial council December 18, 1907.

Flag of Santa Clara, containing the coat of arms

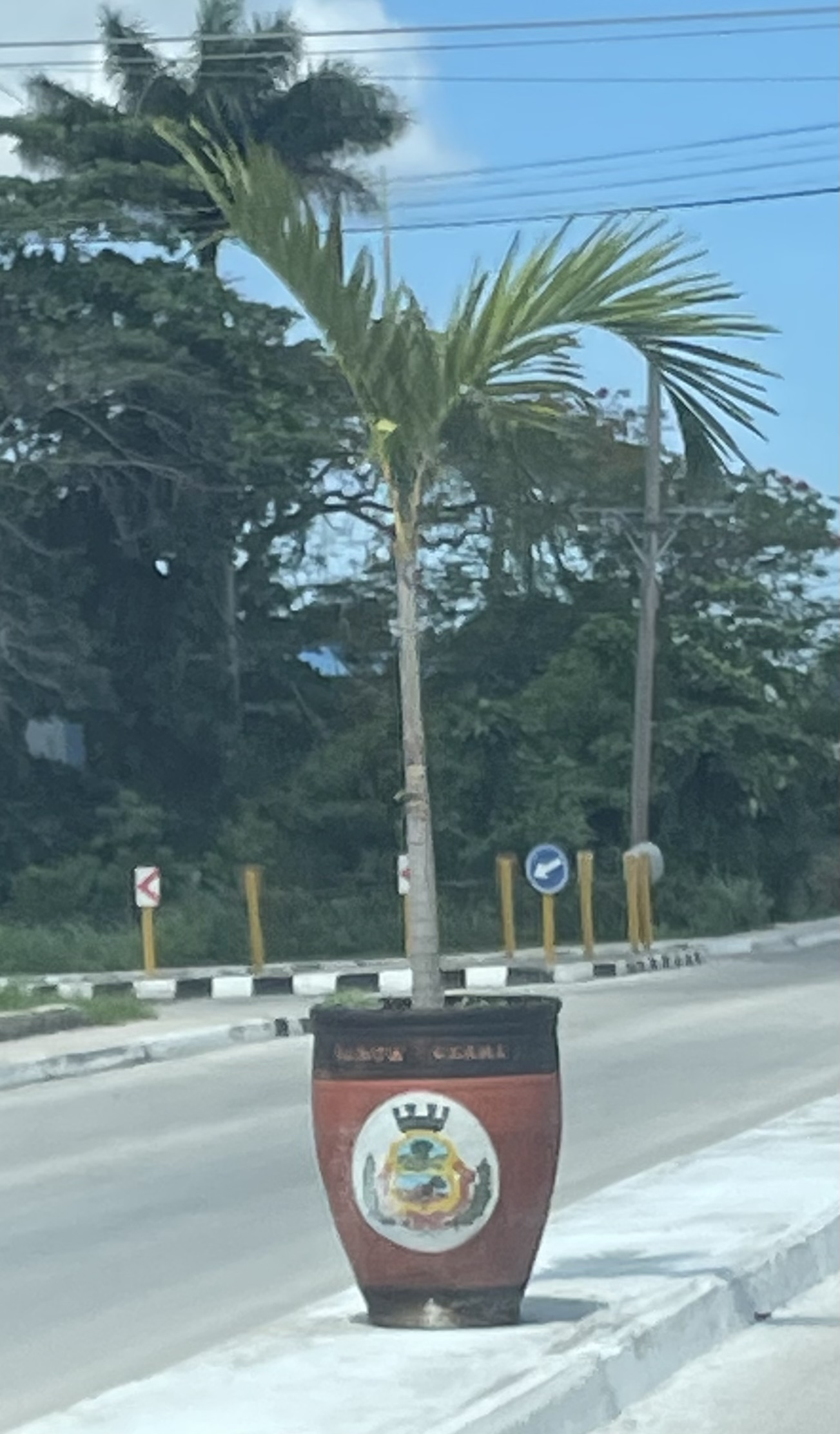
Coat of arms on a flower pot

== See also ==
- Coat of arms of Havana
- Coat of arms of Cuba
