= Newton Estape Vila =

Cuban photographer and journalist

- Born: 2 May 1913; Santa Clara, Villa Clara, Cuba
- Died: 22 November 1980 (aged 67); Havana, Cuba
- Occupations: Photographer, journalist

Newton Estape Vila (Santa Clara, 2 May 1913 - Havana, 22 November 1980) was a prominent Cuban photographer and journalist.

Estape became a journalist and photographer without any formal schooling.

== Collective exhibitions ==
In 1946 his work was displayed as part of the Seventh Salón Nacional, Club Fotográfico de Cuba (CFC), Havana. In 1948 he was included in the I International Saloon of Artistic Photographie, Photographic Club of Cuba.

== Collections ==
His works can be found in collections such as Colección de la Familia Escapé, Havana. He wrote and directed the documentary Si Me Dieran Otra Vida in 1992.
