= Battle of Santa Clara =

Climax of the Cuban Revolution

Coordinates: 22°24′19″N 79°57′15″W

- Part of the Cuban Revolution
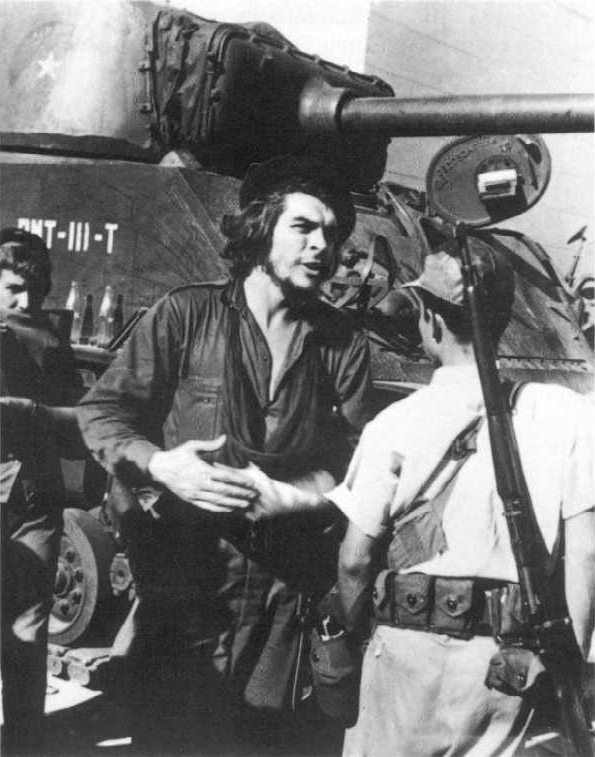
- Che Guevara, after the Battle of Santa Clara, 1 January 1959
Date	28 December 1958 – 1 January 1959
Location	Santa Clara, Cuba
Result	Rebel victory: Fall of Havana; Final defeat of Batista government; Batista flees Cuba; Dissolution of Batista government

Belligerents
Republic of Cuba	26th of July Movement; Second National Front of Escambray; Directorio Revolucionario

Commanders and leaders
Col. Joaquín Casillas (executed); Police Chief Cornelio Rojas (executed); Col. Fernandez Suero; Col. Candido Hernandez	Che Guevara; Rolando Cubela; Roberto Rodríguez †; Antonio Núñez Jiménez; William Alexander Morgan

Units involved
Leoncio Vidal Regiment; 31 Regiment	Unknown

Strength
3,900 soldiers 10 tanks 1 armoured train 7 B-26 medium bombers	340 guerrillas

Casualties and losses
2,900 captured 1 armoured train destroyed	Unknown

The Battle of Santa Clara was a series of events in late December 1958 that led to the capture of the Cuban city of Santa Clara by rebel forces under the command of Che Guevara at the end of the Cuban Revolution. A decisive victory for the rebels who fought against the regime of General Fulgencio Batista, the battle culminated in the Triumph of the Revolution. Within 12 hours of the city's capture, Batista fled Cuba, and Fidel Castro's forces claimed overall victory.

== Battle ==
=== Attack on the city ===
Guevara's column traveled on 28 December 1958 from the coastal port of Caibarién along the Road to Camajuaní, which lay between Caibarién and Santa Clara. Their journey was received by cheering crowds of peasants, and Caibarién's capture within a day reinforced the sense among the rebel fighters that overall victory was imminent. Government troops guarding the army garrison at Camajuani deserted their posts without incident, and Guevara's column proceeded to Santa Clara. They arrived at the city's university on the outskirts of the town at dusk.

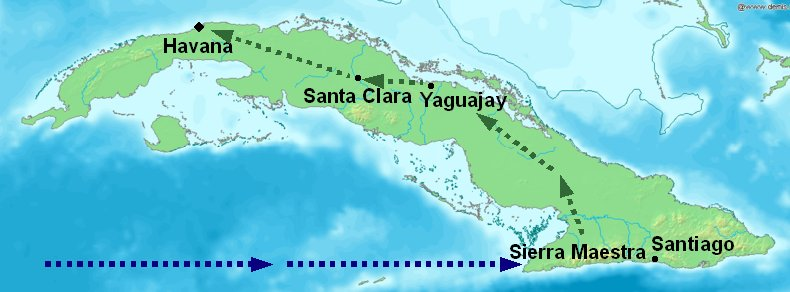
Map of Cuba showing the location of the arrival of the rebels on the Granma yacht in late 1956, the rebels' stronghold in the Sierra Maestra, and Guevara's route towards Havana via Santa Clara in December 1958.

Guevara, who was wearing his arm in a sling after falling off a wall during the fighting in Caibarién, divided his forces, numbering about 300, into two columns. The southern column was the first to meet the defending army forces commanded by Colonel Casillas Lumpuy. An armoured train, sent by Batista with ammunition, weapons, and other equipment, traveled to the foot of the hill of Capiro, northeast of the city, establishing a command post there. Guevara dispatched his "suicide squad", a force under 23-year-old Roberto Rodríguez (known as "El Vaquerito"), to capture the hill. The defenders of the hill withdrew with surprising speed, and the train, with officers and soldiers from the command post aboard, withdrew towards the centre of the town.

Within Santa Clara a series of skirmishes took place between government forces and the second rebel column, led by Rolando Cubela, with the assistance of civilians providing Molotov cocktails. Two army garrisons (the barracks of the Leoncio Vidal Regiment and the barracks of the 31 Regiment of the Rural Guard) were under siege from Cubela's forces despite army support from aircraft, snipers, and tanks.

=== Capture of the train ===
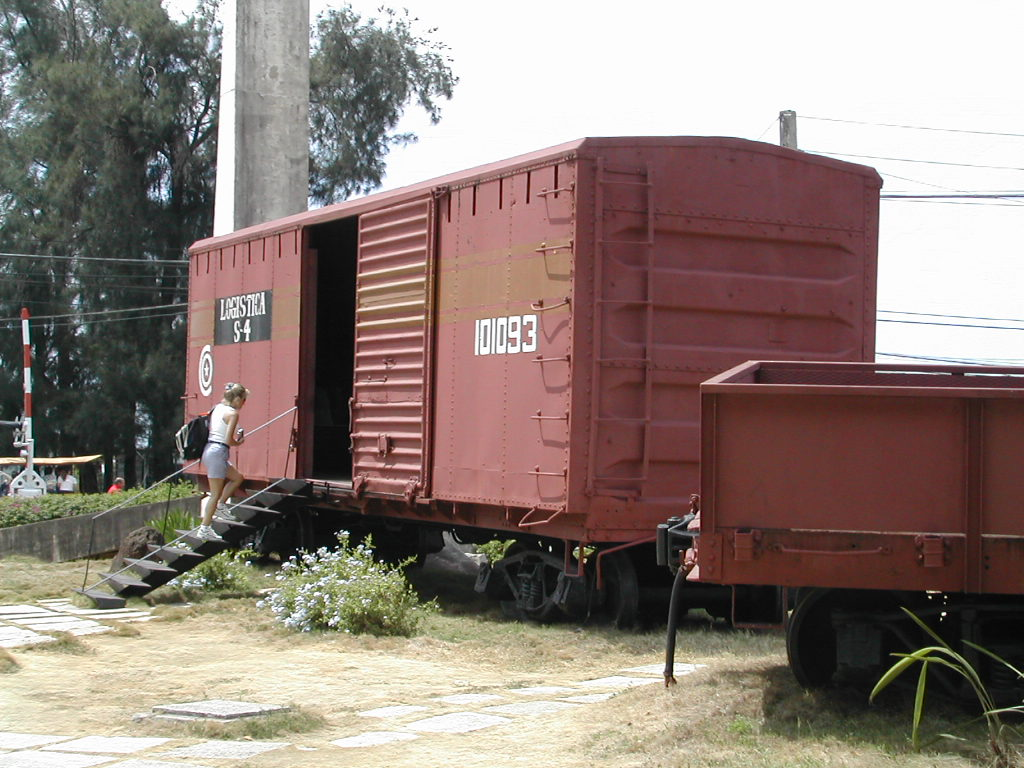
The armored train, today a museum.

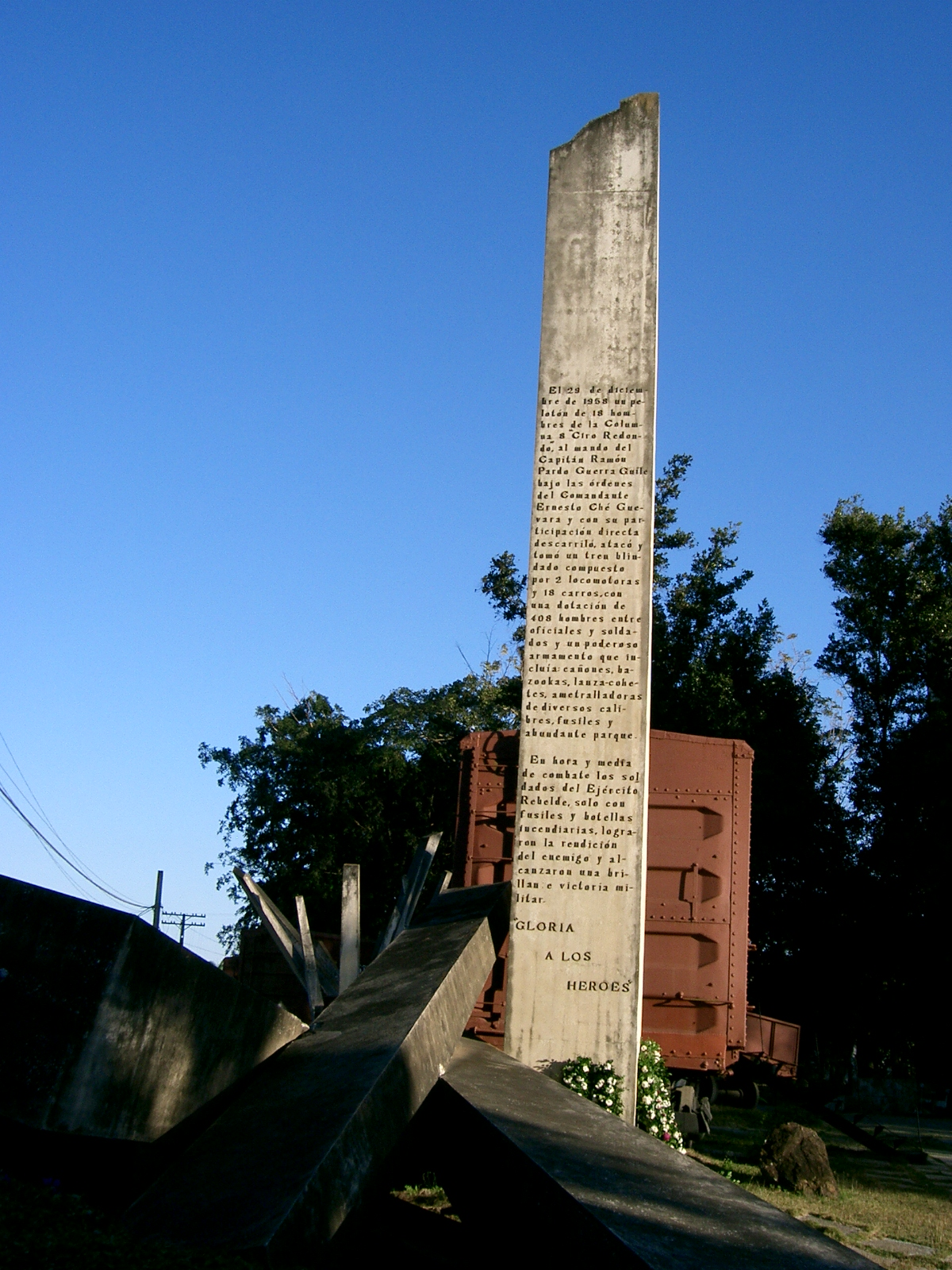
A memorial of the attack on Santa Clara at the armored train memorial.

Guevara, who viewed the capture of the armoured train as a priority, successfully mobilized the tractors of the school of Agronomy at the university to raise the rails of the railway. The train was therefore derailed as it transported troops away from Capiro hill. The officers within tumbled out asking for a truce. At this, ordinary soldiers, whose morale was very low, began to fraternize with the rebels, saying that they were tired of fighting against their own people. Shortly afterward the armored train was in the hands of the rebels and its 350 men and officers were transported as prisoners.

The train contained a considerable amount of weaponry, which would be used in the further attack in the hands of both the rebels and supportive peasants. Guevara described how the government forces were forced out by a volley of Molotov cocktails, causing the armored train to become a "veritable oven for the soldiers".

The capture of the train and the subsequent media broadcasts from both the government and the rebels proved to be a key tipping point in the revolution. Despite the next day's newspapers hailing Batista's "victory" at Santa Clara, contrary broadcasts from Castro's rebel forces accelerated the succession of army surrenders. The reports ended with the news that rebel leaders were heading "without let or hindrance" towards Havana to take over the government.

The "Armored Train" (Spanish: Tren Blindado) is a national memorial and museum located near the depot of Santa Clara station.

=== Capture of the city ===
Most garrisons around the country quickly surrendered to the first guerrilla commander who showed up at their gate. In mid-afternoon, Che announced over Radio Rebelde that the last troops in Santa Clara had surrendered.
