= Parque de los Mártires =

Park in Santa Clara, Cuba

Coordinates: 22°24′47.41″N 79°57′58.97″W

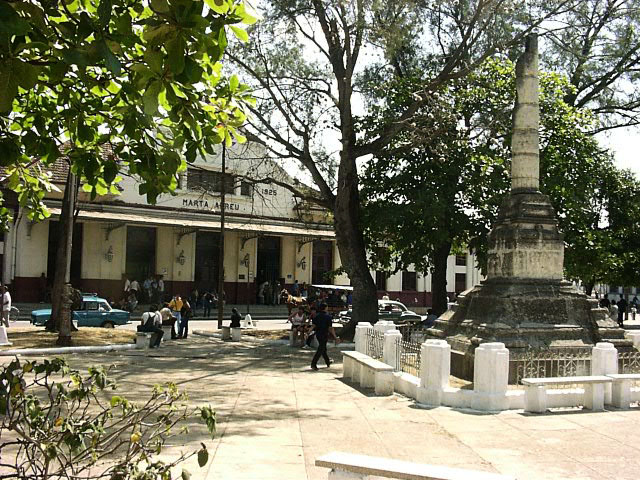
Santa Clara's Railway Station in 1999, across Martyrs Park

Parque de los Mártires (Martyrs Park) is a park in Santa Clara, Cuba. It is a few blocks from Parque del Carmen in front of Santa Clara railway station.

== Overview ==
A triangular shaped space with many points of interests. Its center piece is a truncated column, the only one in rural Cuba in honor of those fighters who lost their lives in the Independence War. 18th- and 19th-century buildings surround the park. The Railway Station is an example of colonial architecture, a building supposedly donated to the city by philanthropist Marta Abreu. Across from the station a colonial wooden family house still stands. Another important building in the park area is an art deco former Spanish garrison transformed in a school after the revolution. Its interior walls were considered the best example of The Vanguardist Movement Murals in Cuba. Cuban painter Amelia Peláez contributed to it, but the paintings have been almost completely lost. This building is a school for young children and has not been retouched for last five decades.

A statue of poet and independence leader José Martí is in Martyrs Park instead of Parque Vidal, the main plaza of the city.

The oldest domestic examples of architecture in the city are found in streets connecting this park with nearby Parque del Carmen traveling east of them towards Parque Vidal.

== Gallery ==
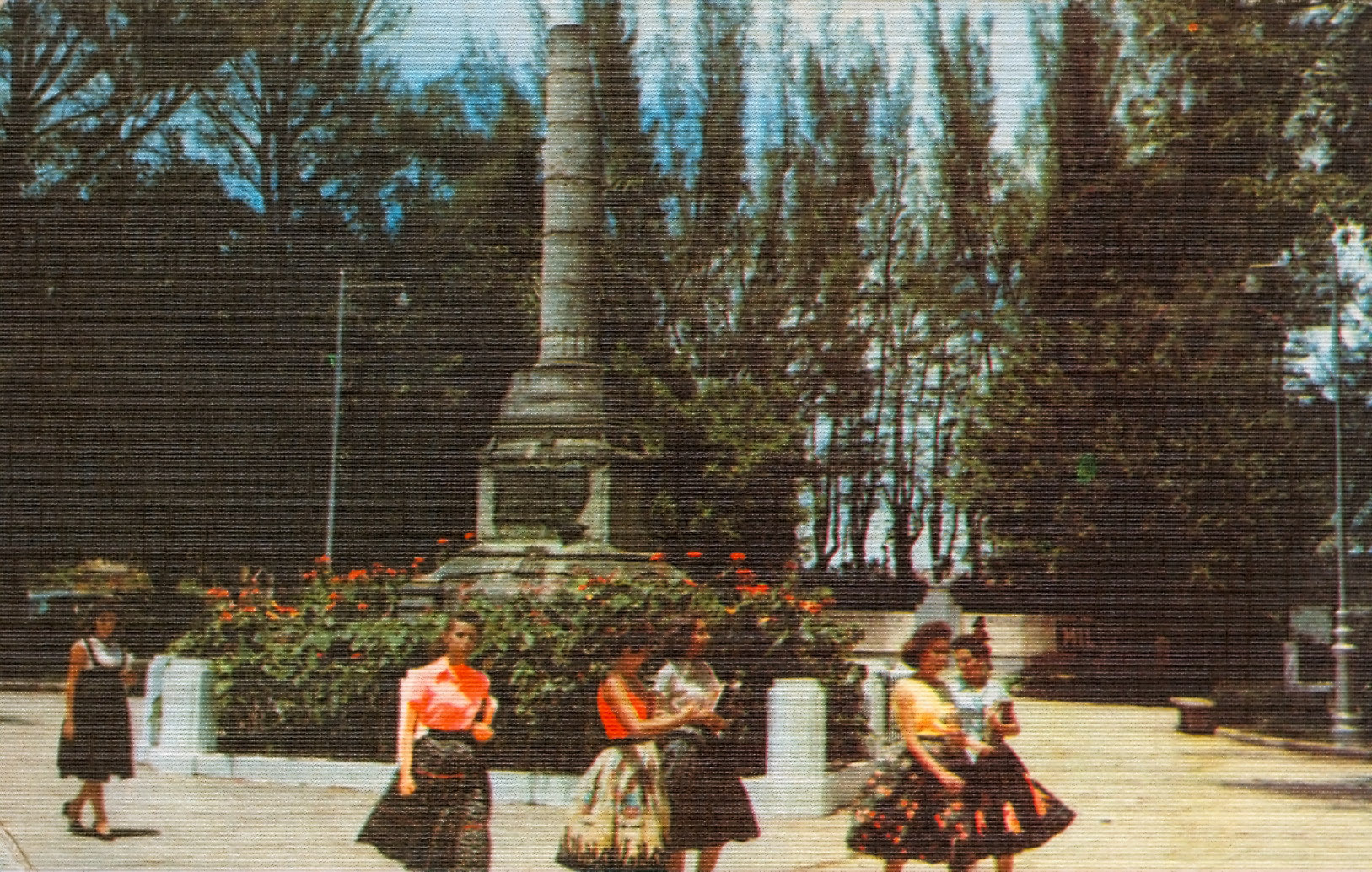
Historic postcard of Parque de los Mártires, circa 1945–50, at the moment was named Parque Martí, to honor José Martí (bust at the back), it was later renamed to honor all Independence fighters, to whom the truncated pillar monument was built.

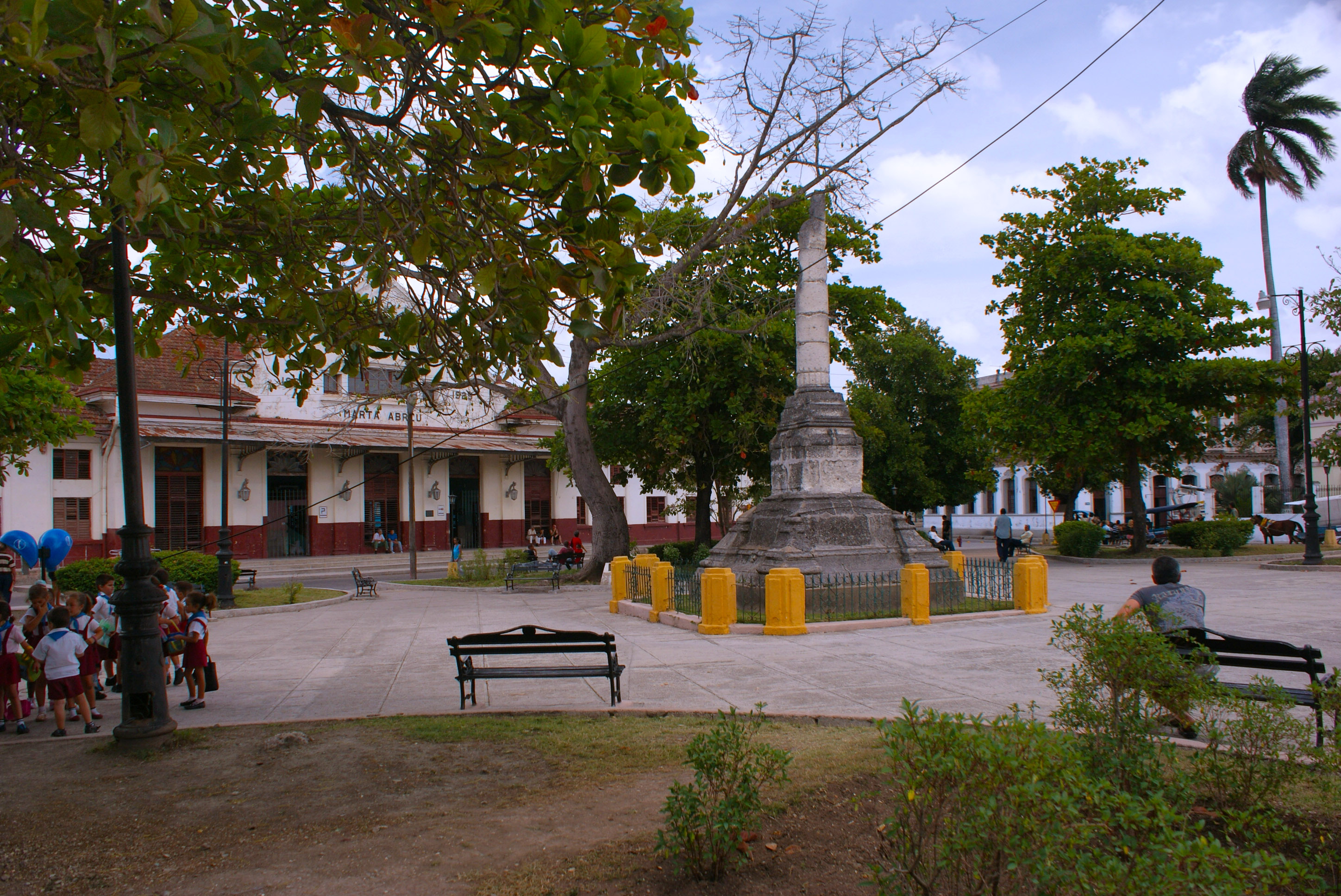
Marta Abreu train station across Martyrs' Park. At the centre the truncated pillar monument dedicated to the martyrs of the colonial independence war. Photo from 2010

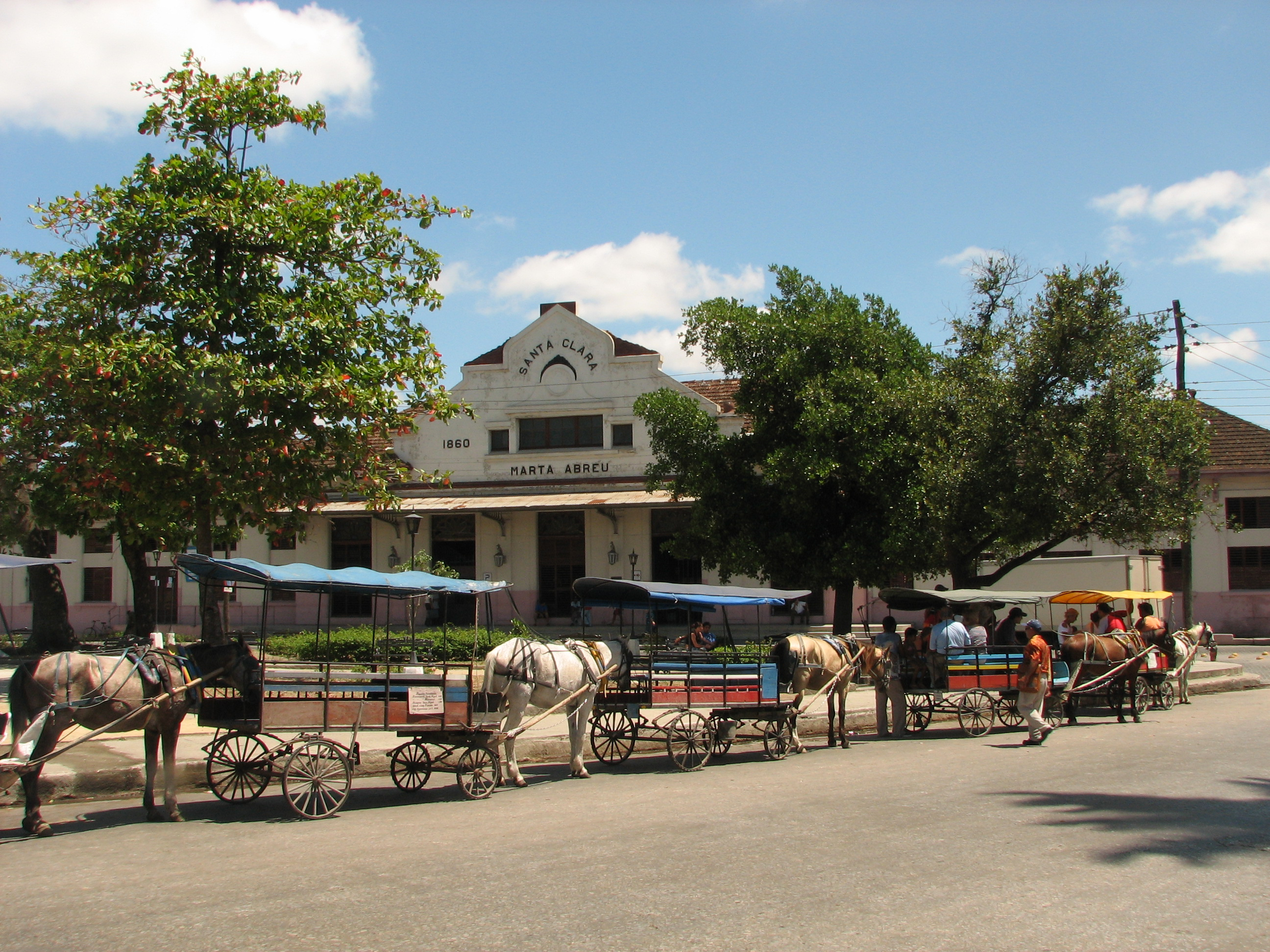
Marta Abreu train station, across the Martyrs Park. A line of horse drawn taxi carriages awaits their turn to fill up with travelers. Photo from 2010
