= Francisco Javier Balmaseda =

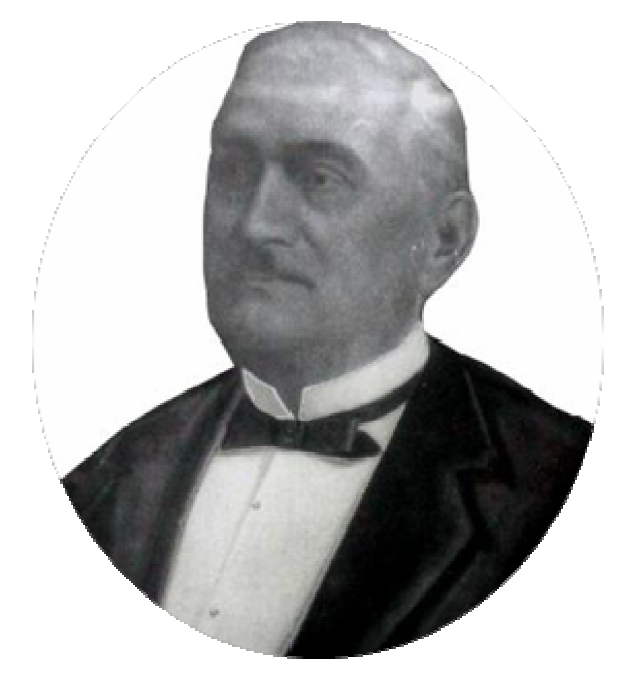
- Born: March 31, 1823; San Juan de los Remedios
- Died: February 17, 1907 (aged 83)
- Occupation: Writer

Francisco Javier Balmaseda Jullien (March 31, 1823 – February 17, 1907) was a Cuban writer.

Francisco Javier Balmaseda was born on March 31, 1823 in San Juan de los Remedios, Villa Clara, Cuba. In 1846 he published, at Havana, Rimas Cubanas and in 1861, Fábulas Morales. Some years later he published the novel Misterios de una Cabaña, a work on political economy, and another on agriculture. In 1869 Balmaseda was banished and sent to Fernando Po with many other revolutionists, and in 1871 he published a narrative under the title of Los Confinados á Fernando Po. Francisco Javier Balmaseda died on 17 February 1907.
