= Loma del Capiro =

Coordinates: 22.40831°N 79.94929°W

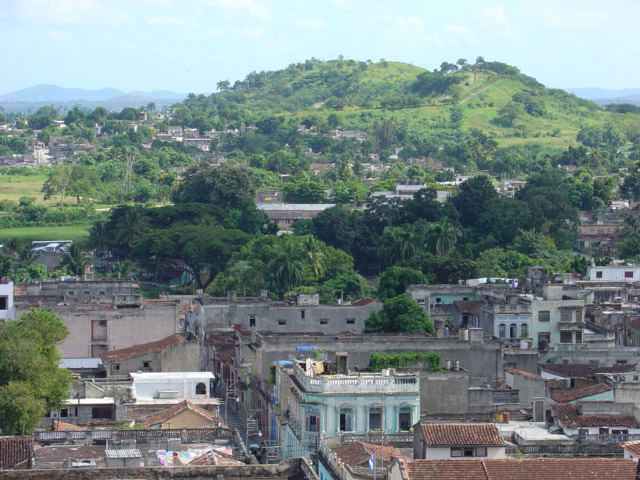
Loma del Capiro and the rooftops of Santa Clara

Loma del Capiro (English: Capiro's Hill) is a group of three small peaks located in the city of Santa Clara, Cuba.

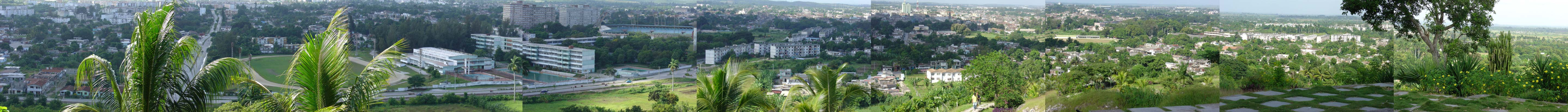
View from the Hill; historic Santa Clara at far center of the panoramic, new developments South (left) and countryside with sugarcane crops and Cuban Royal Palm Roystonea regia forest by Northeast (right)

The elevation gained local and worldwide historic significance after Che Guevara used it as hideout and command center to invade the city in a battle known as Battle of Santa Clara during the Cuban Revolution. With an altitude of 176.6 m (579 ft), the smallest peak holds the name of Capiro and next to it, with 185.9 and 188.4 meters (610 and 618 ft) tall are twin peaks known as Dos Hermanas (Two sisters). A monument commemorating the battle was placed at the top of the smallest peak. A lookout is located close to it, providing a view of the city, the savanna filled with royal palms and farms. The natural surroundings provide shelter to endemic vegetation and a plantation of Santa Clara's tree, the tamarind sits on the South side of it.

== History ==
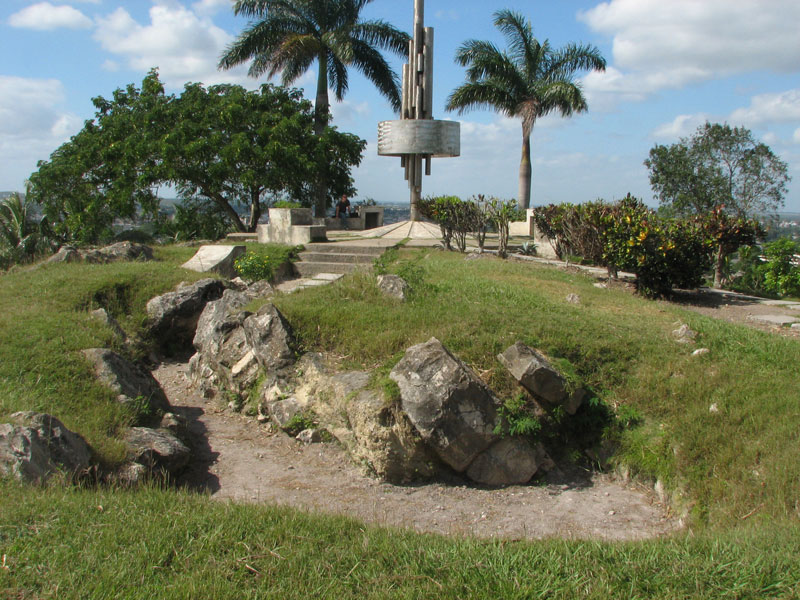
Hill top with Dellara's monument and the trenches used by rebels in the Battle of Santa Clara

With a strategic location overlooking the city, the hill was decisive for the rebels in their quest to take down the Batista regime in 1958. Boasting an army airport, Santa Clara city had several garrisons, numerous troops, mortars tanks and air support. Che Guevara initially estimated that taking over the city would take around two months of fighting. A key action in the very beginning of the battle made it happen in just a few days. Che intercepted an armored train filled with weapons passing the skirts of Capiro hill. The train was derailed and using Molotov cocktails against its metal walls, the soldiers inside did not stand a chance against the heat and surrendered. A museum and monument of the armored train action stands near the hill today. With all the new armaments the rebels began gaining positions inside the city. Once Santa Clara was in the hands of the rebel force, Batista fled Cuba from Havana, never to return again.

== Nature ==
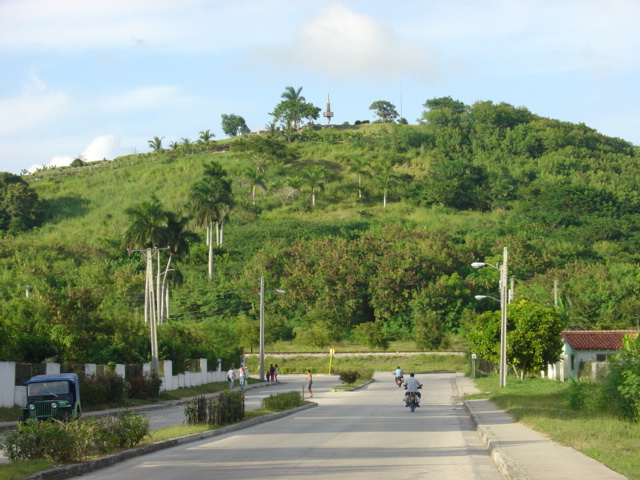
Capiro's Hill with Che's Battle of Santa Clara Monument at the top

Aside from the great historic importance of Capiro hill, there is also a great natural, scientific and tourist interest attached to these hills, unfortunately these others features are completely unknown to locals and visitors.

A witness of the Chicxulub impact

In an article released in GeoScienceWorld in September 2005 by Laia Alegret is described how the author researched the sediments at Loma Capiro in Central Cuba and provided new evidence about the Chicxulub impact. The Chicxulub impact refers to the huge meteor that hit the Yucatán Peninsula in the Cretaceous/Paleogene era and is believed to have played a major role in the mass extinction of the dinosaurs. During impact, mega tsunamis, earthquakes and continental destabilization were generated. It affected Cuba in particular, due to the proximity and elongated shape of the island.

A natural shelter

Many endemic species of the Cuban savanna and forests can be found on the north slope of the site, while in the south, a plantation of Tamarind trees was started decades ago. This is the symbolic tree of Santa Clara city, representing its foundation. This plantation helps prevent slope erosion and provides fruit for the nearby community.

== Tourism ==
Declared National Historic Site of Cuba in 1990, along with the museum-monument of the armored train a staircase was built in order to reach the top of the hill where a metal sculpture by Jose Delarra is resting in a green marble base. It symbolizes the will to unify the Cuban nation. The trenches dug by the rebel forces surround the monument. The place serves as lookout post for the outstanding beauty of Santa Clara valley savanna, interrupted here and there by royal palms and farmlands. The city lies down the hill facing South West. Locals used to gather around at night in the site with guitars to serenade friends. In 2002 "Trabajos Comunales" (Community Works), a government enterprise in charge of every city public works, considered the possibility of turning the three hills and surrounding areas into a city natural recreation park and zoo; but without any funds for the idea, they had to keep improving the small city zoo instead.
