= Cornelio Rojas =

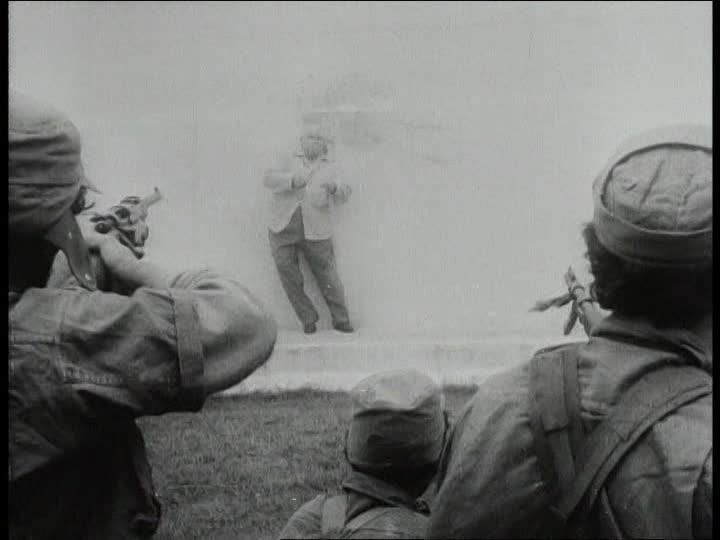
Televised execution of Colonel Rojas, ordered by Che Guevara.

Cornelio Rojas Fernández (17 November 1900–7 January 1959) was a lieutenant-colonel in the Cuban police under the Batista regime.

His grandfather was a hero of the Cuban War of Independence.

In 1958 he was chief of police in Santa Clara, and took part in the Battle of Santa Clara against Che Guevara.

Shortly after capture, he was executed by firing squad on live television.
