= Tren Blindado =

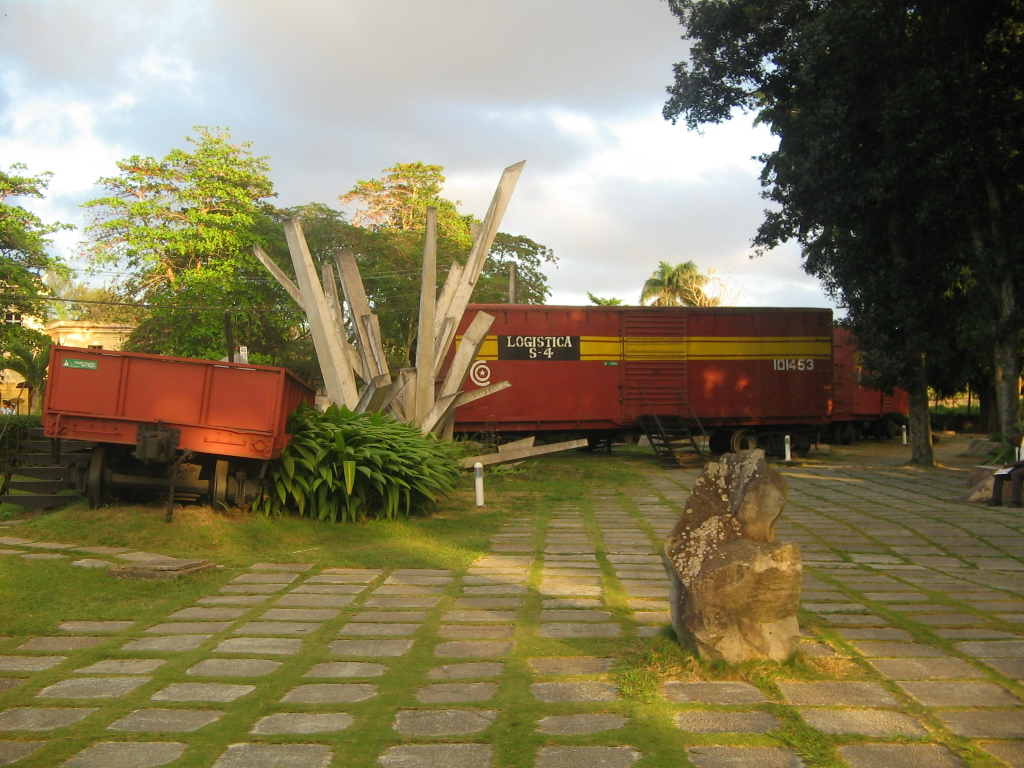
- Park of the Tren Blindado with some of the derailed cars
- Location: Santa Clara, Cuba
- Coordinates: 22.4098°N 79.9603°W
- Type: National monument, memorial and museum
- Owner: Cuban Government

The Tren Blindado (transl. Armoured train) is a national monument, memorial park, and museum of the Cuban Revolution, located in the city of Santa Clara, Cuba. It was created by the Cuban sculptor José Delarra on the site of and in memory of the capture of an armoured train on 29 December 1958, during the Battle of Santa Clara.

== Overview ==
The memorial is located on the Avenida Liberación in the Bengochea ward, just after the depot of Santa Clara station, nearby a level crossing. It lies between the Havana-Camagüey-Santiago rail line and the Cubanicay river. It consists of an open sculpture park, an obelisk dedicated to Che Guevara, and a monument representing the bulldozer used by Guevara and his soldiers to derail the train. One of the sculptures consists of a series of obelisks set at different angles to evoke an explosion. The derailed cars are used as the rooms of the museum. When a correspondent for Smithsonian visited the site in 2016, he reported that some cars still had visible blast marks.

== Historical events ==
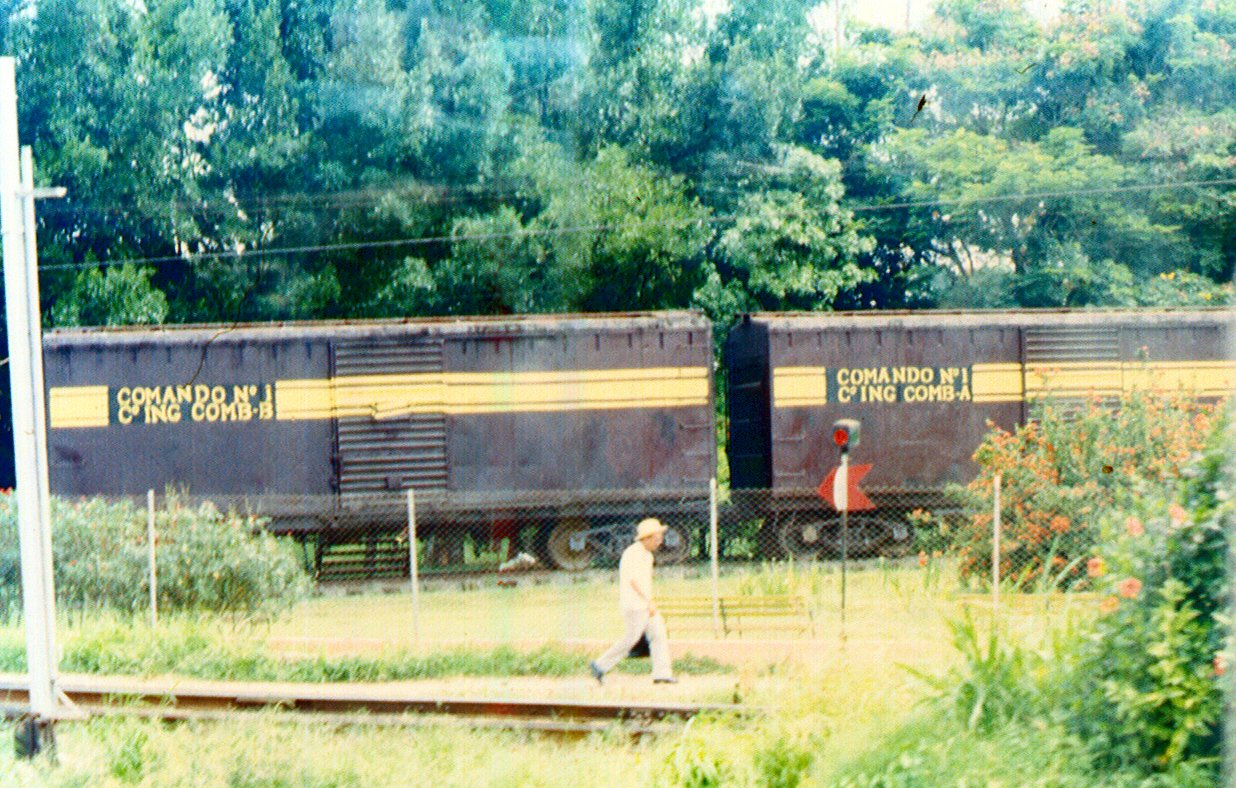
Old layout of the park showing cars with a different dark brown livery (1984).

The capture of the train followed the conquest of the whole of Santa Clara. Due to this final victory, the city is still called the "city of the heroic guerrillas". After Fidel Castro captured Santa Clara, Batista wanted to bring about a turning point in the battle and the war. In an attempt to defeat the revolutionaries led by Fidel Castro, he sent an armored train from Havana on 23 December 1958. The large train had two diesel locomotives and seventeen four-axle freight cars and U.S.-made personnel carriers. The train carried 373 armed soldiers, ammunition, and provisions for two months.

The next day it reached Santa Clara and stopped at the foot of the Loma del Capiro hill. Three days later eighteen guerrillas under the command of Ernesto "Che" Guevara attacked the train. When the officers tried to move the train to a better position, Guevara derailed the train by bulldozing 30 meters of track. After several hours of fierce combat, the guerrillas captured the weapons and ammunition. The officers finally surrendered in the evening. Many of the rebels befriended and fraternized with the soldiers they had been fighting only hours before.

== Gallery ==
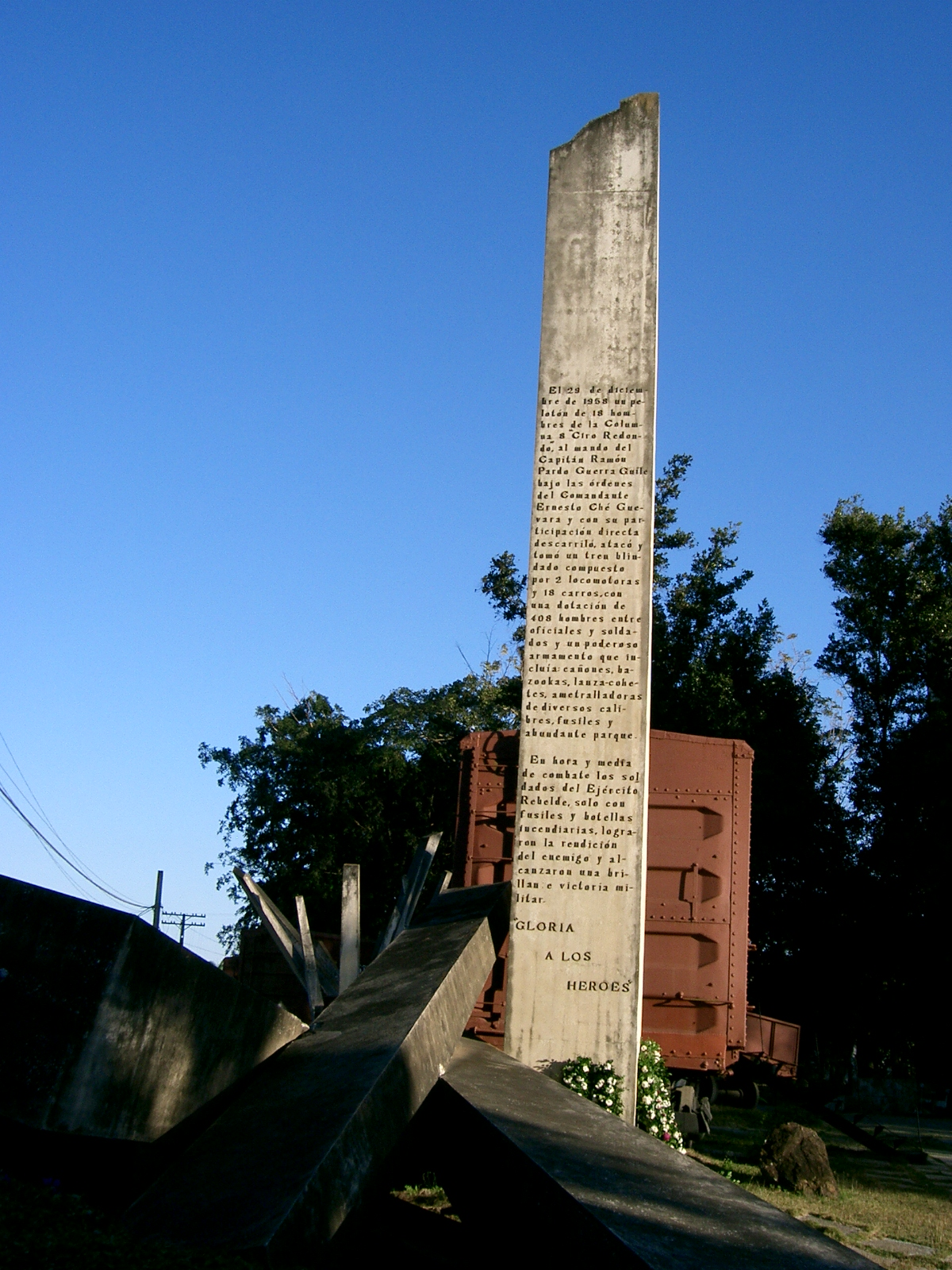
The "Obelisk of Che Guevara"

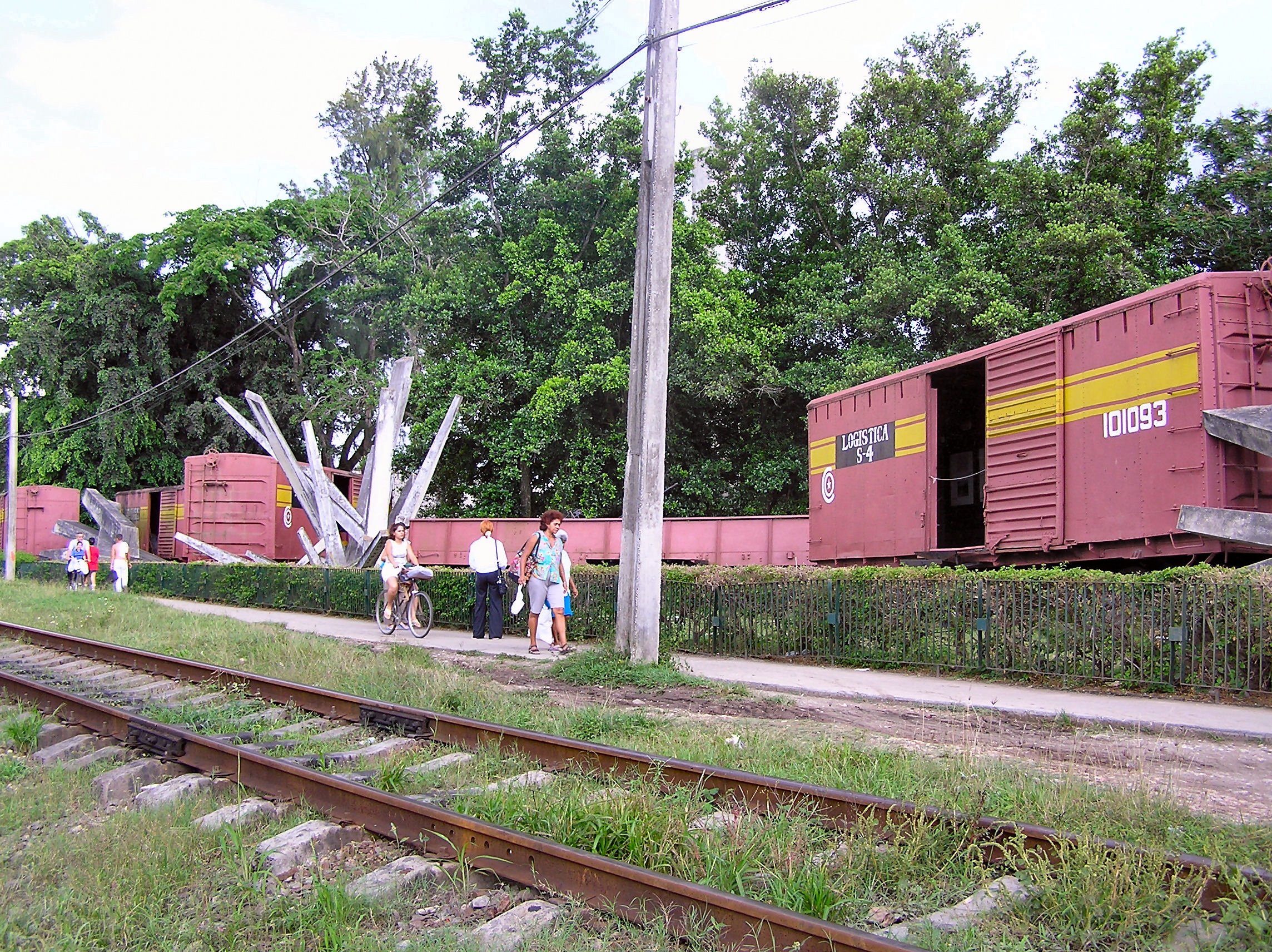
View of the memorial from the Havana-Santiago rail line

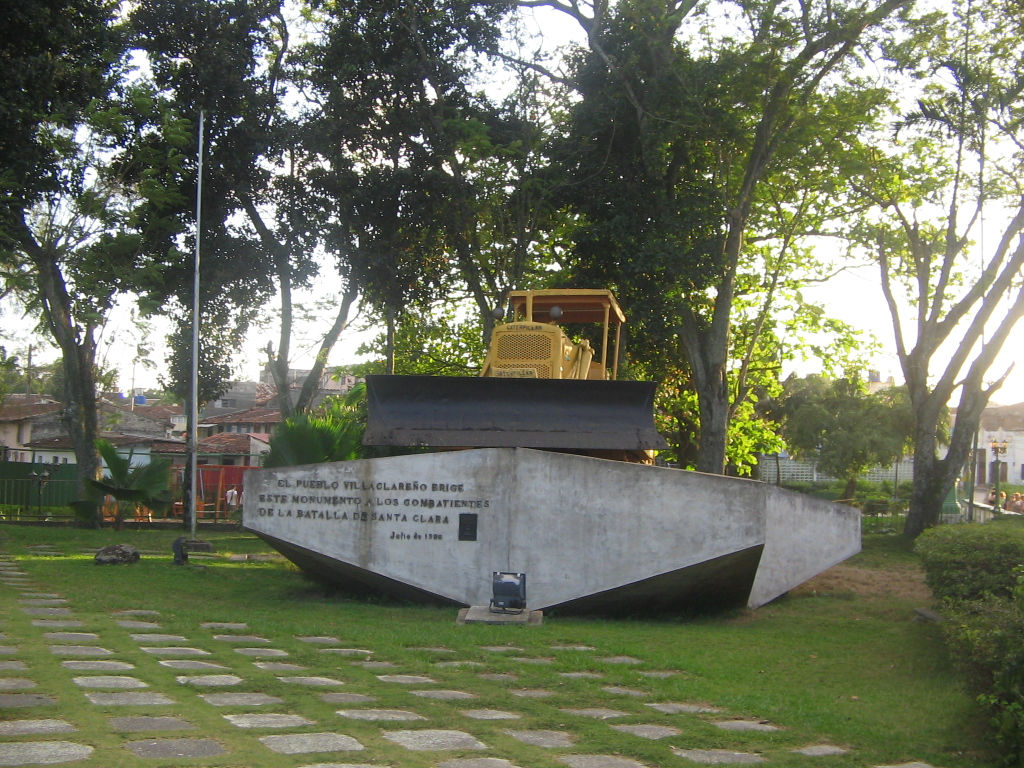
Monument of the bulldozer

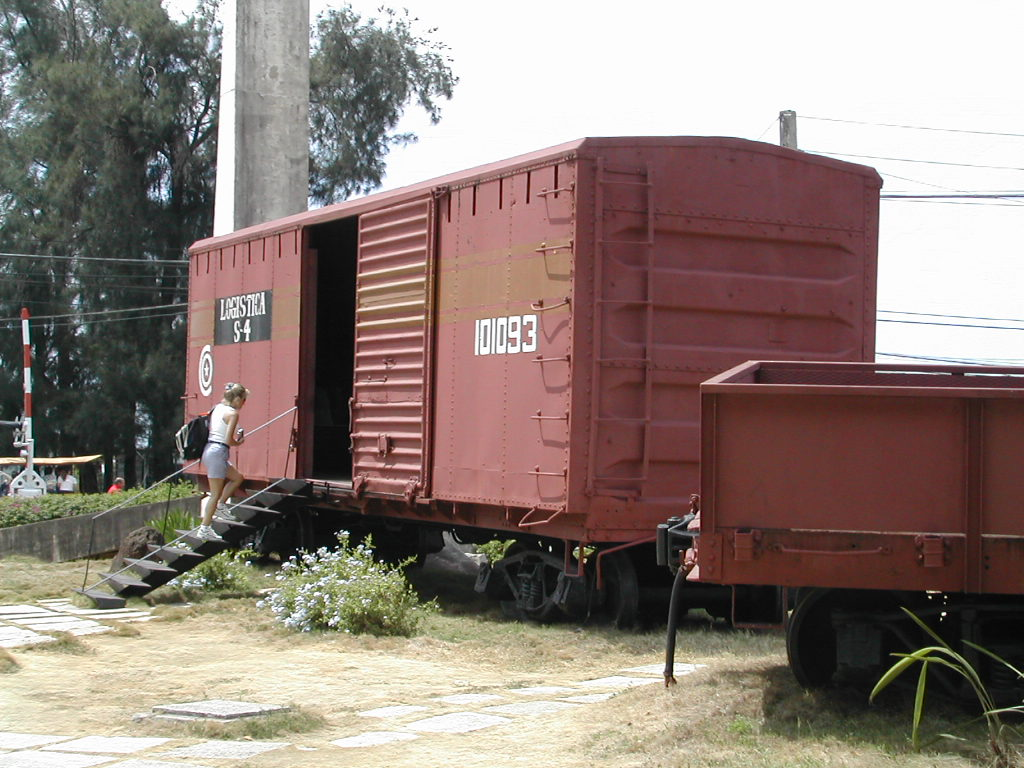
Entrance to a car of the armored train

== Media ==
The events surrounding the Tren Blindado have been depicted in at least two major-studio films:

- Cuba, a 1979 US drama film directed by Richard Lester and starring Sean Connery.
- Che (Part 1: The Argentine), a 2008 US/French/Spanish drama film directed by Steven Soderbergh and starring Benicio del Toro.
