= Manajanabo =

- Town
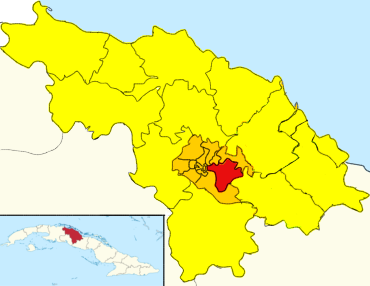
- Manajanabo (red) in Santa Clara (orange) in Villa Clara (yellow)

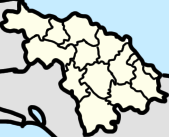
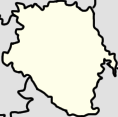
- Location within Cuba Location within Villa Clara Province Location within Santa Clara
- Coordinates: 22.3839738°N 79.8169152°W
- Country: Cuba
- Province: Villa Clara
- Municipality: Santa Clara

Area
  - Total: 0.452 km^{2} (0.175 sq mi)

Population (2012)
  - Total: 1,750
  - Density: 3,870/km^{2} (10,000/sq mi)
- Postal Code: 50100

Manajanabo is a town and ward (consejo popular) in Santa Clara, Cuba. Manajanabo lies on the Minerva Lake.

== Geography ==
Manajanabo ward borders Sakenaf, Escambray, Vigía Sandino, Universidad, and Camilo Cienfuegos.

== Notable people ==
- Gerardo Machado, president of Cuba from 1925–33
