= Camilo Cienfuegos, Villa Clara =

Camilo Cienfuegos
- Popular Council and Village
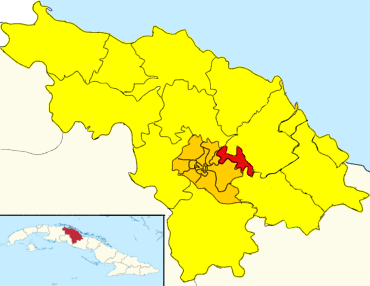
- Camilo Cienfuegos (red) in Santa Clara (orange) in Villa Clara (yellow)

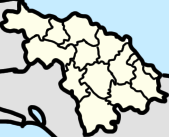
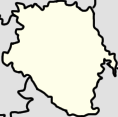
- Location within Cuba Location within Villa Clara Province Location within Santa Clara
- Coordinates: 22.4365223°N 79.8877792°W
- Country: Cuba
- Province: Villa Clara
- Municipality: Santa Clara
- Named for: Camilo Cienfuegos
- Elevation: 92.0 m (301.8 ft)

Population
  - Total: 494
- Postal Code: 50100

Camilo Cienfuegos (named after the Cuban revolutionary Camilo Cienfuegos) also known as Callejón de Los Patos is a village and consejo popular (ward) in Santa Clara, Villa Clara, Cuba.
