= Santa Clara, Cuba =

Santa Clara
- City
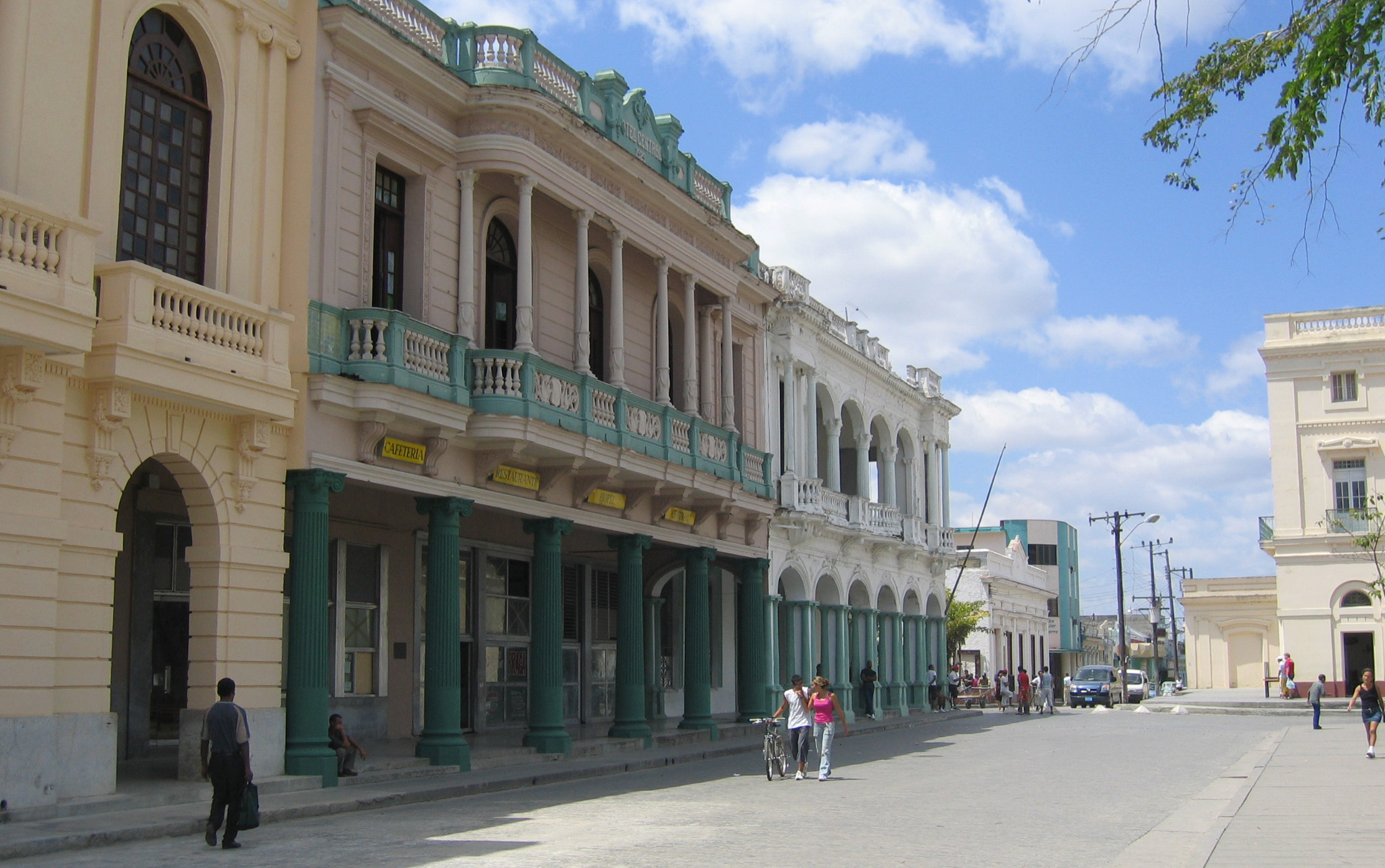
- A street in Parque Vidal, the heart of Santa Clara

- Flag Coat of arms

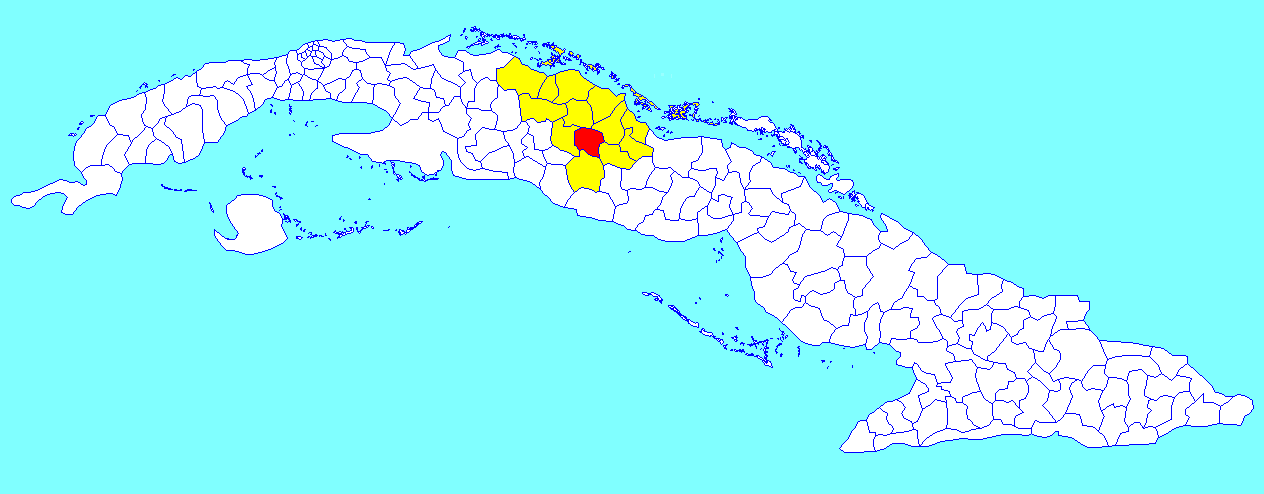
- Santa Clara municipality (red) within Villa Clara Province (yellow) and Cuba
- Coordinates: 22°24′24.91″N 79°57′53.78″W
- Country: Cuba
- Province: Villa Clara
- Founded: 15 July 1689
- Established: 1 January 1690

Government
  - President: Osmani García López

Area
  - Total: 514 km^{2} (198 sq mi)
- Elevation: 125 m (410 ft)

Population (2023)
  - Total: 191,000
  - Rank: 6th
  - Density: 372/km^{2} (962/sq mi)
  - Municipality: 245,959
- Demonym: Santaclareño
- Time zone: UTC-5 (EST)
- Postal code: 50100
- Area code: +53 422
- Website: https://www.misantaclara.gob.cu/

Santa Clara is the capital city of the Cuban province of Villa Clara. It is centrally located in the province and Cuba. Santa Clara is the fifth-most populous Cuban city, with a population of nearly 245,959.

== History ==
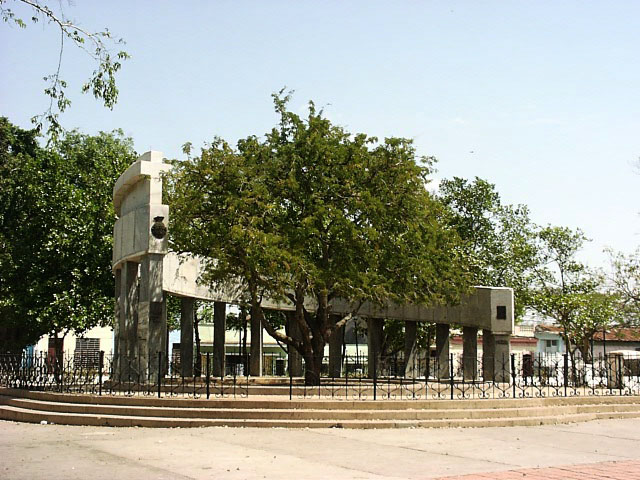
Tamarind, Santa Clara's tree and foundation-of-city monument

Santa Clara was founded by 175 people on 15 July 1689. 138 of them represented two large families already living in the area, who owned land next to the new city. The other 37 came from seven other families and included a priest and governor, all originating in the coastal city of San Juan de los Remedios.

The population of Remedios had to choose between leaving their city, constantly being besieged by pirates, or staying. While most decided to stay, 37 people traveled south to the interior. On 1 June 1689, they arrived at a hill, joining two other families already present at the site. According to tradition, a mass was celebrated under a tamarind tree and Santa Clara was founded. Since then, the place under the tree has been known as Loma del Carmen (transl. Carmen's hill). A second-generation church was built in a park along the plaza. A monument commemorating the event is surrounded by a fourth-generation tamarind tree.

The settlement was originally called Cayo Nuevo, which was changed to Dos Cayos, Villa Nueva de Santa Clara, Pueblo Nuevo de Antón Díaz, Villa Clara, and finally Santa Clara.

Construction of the city began near Loma del Carmen. Following the Spanish standards, a perfect squared layout with a central plaza (Plaza Mayor, today known as Parque Vidal) was developed. The first buildings erected were the cabildo (city council) and a palm tree church. The latter building was replaced in 1725 with a brick one. It remained at the center of the Parque Vidal as Catedral de Santa Clara de Asís until 22 August 1923. It was demolished so that the plaza could be expanded and a new church built nearby. This decision by the mayor is still criticized to this day. Although the church was not of the finest architecture, it was one of the oldest colonial structures in the city and a part of its fabric. After the expropriation by the mayor and city council, religious officials complained and the court awarded 77,850 pesos in fines as a settlement to the church.

Soon after the city was founded, a theater, a chamber of commerce, meeting clubs, public libraries, and dance halls were erected as well. Positioned nearly in the center of the country, the city became a popular travelers' stop and a prominent transport hub; these conditions supported its steady growth. By the 19th century, Santa Clara was bigger and more populated than nearby towns, including what was once Remedios. As a necessary stop between Havana and the east of the country, the city became the capital of Las Villas province.

=== Marta Abreu de Estévez ===
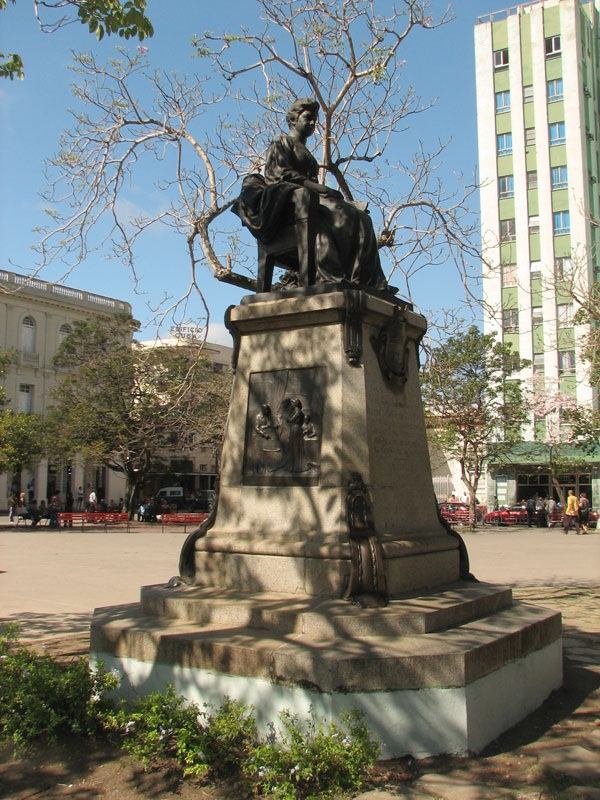
Statue of Marta Abreu in Parque Vidal

Two well-known figures are associated with Santa Clara: Marta Abreu de Estévez, a beloved native daughter known as "the Benefactress of the City", and Ernesto Che Guevara, a political activist and leader of the Cuban Revolution. Guevara is buried here, where he waged the final battle of the revolution that toppled the Fulgencio Batista government in 1958.

Abreu is notable for the numerous projects she and her family promoted through their philanthropy, intended to enhance the life of the citizens of Santa Clara. Abreu and her husband Luis Estévez, who became the first vice president of the young republic in 1902, were well-known sympathizers and contributors to the Cuban rebels' cause during the War of Cuban Independence against Spain. (This was the initial phase of the Spanish–American War; the US became involved in supporting some forces seeking independence.)

Abreu's legacy includes institutions all over the city: an electric plant building, several schools, an asylum, public laundry stations by the Belico River (two still exist, although in poor condition), the fire station a block off the Parque Vidal, and the train station near Loma del Carmen.

The most notable building is the Teatro La Caridad (a theater named in honor of the patron saint of Cuba, La Virgen de la Caridad – Our Lady of Charity). The theater can be seen from one of the corners of the Parque Vidal. Abreu was the project's sole financial sponsor. She supervised the design and construction of the theater. Although it is not as grandiose as the Teatro Tomás Terry in Cienfuegos city, the proceeds of the theater have been designated to support two schools that Abreu founded for the city's poor children. The schools, one for girls and one for boys, were located just behind the theater. Teatro La Caridad is one of the seven major theaters still standing from the colonial era in Cuba. Abreu also donated her own palace to the city; it was used as a provincial government palace and later adapted for use as a public library. Today, it houses the Biblioteca Martí (Martí Library), also located on the Parque Vidal. It is an example of neoclassical architecture and has highly decorated interiors. Santa Clara's university is named after Abreu. She is buried in the Colón cemetery of Havana.

=== Battle of Santa Clara ===
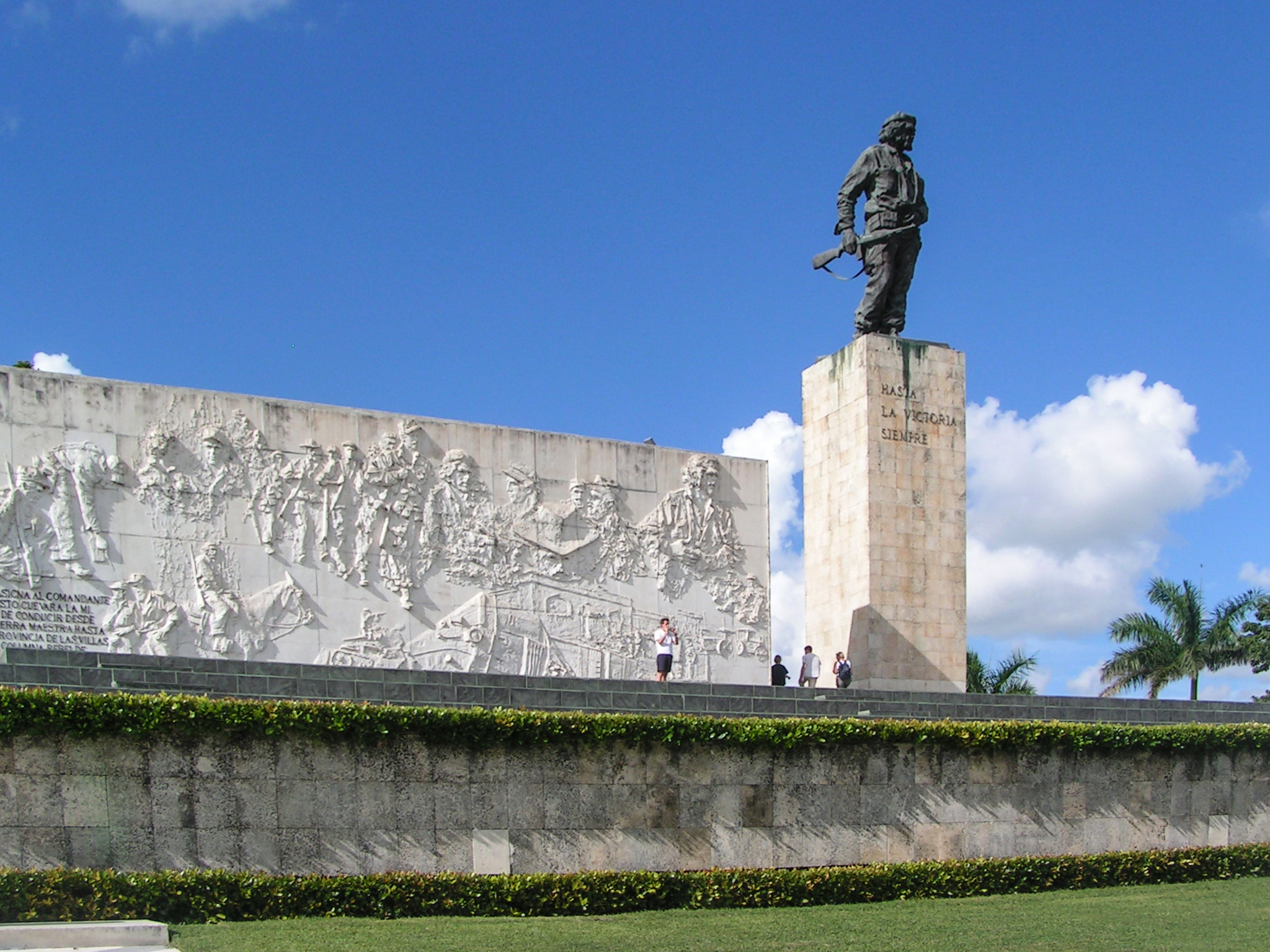
Che Guevara's Monument and Mausoleum

Santa Clara was the site of the last battle of the Cuban Revolution in late 1958. Two guerrilla columns attacked the city; one was led by Ernesto Che Guevara and the other by Camilo Cienfuegos. Guevara's column first captured the garrison at Fomento. Using a bulldozer, Guevara's soldiers destroyed railroad tracks and derailed a train full of troops and supplies sent by Batista. At the same time, Cienfuegos's column defeated an army garrison at the Battle of Yaguajay not far from town. On 31 December 1958, the combined forces of Guevara and Cienfuegos (along with other revolutionaries under William Alexander Morgan) attacked Santa Clara. The battle was chaotic, and the defenders became demoralized. Some fought; others surrendered without a shot. By the afternoon, the city was captured. This victory for Castro's troops is seen as the decisive moment in the Cuban Revolution, as Batista fled Cuba less than 12 hours later.

== Geography ==
Located on a plain below a hillside, in the middle of the surrounding province, Santa Clara is 71.5 km (44.4 mi) from the Caribbean Sea (at Cienfuegos) and 51.7 km (32.1 mi) from the Atlantic Ocean (at Caibarién). The municipality borders with the municipalities of Cifuentes, Camajuaní, Placetas, Manicaragua, and Ranchuelo.

The city is divided into several divisions (repartos):

- America Latina
- Antón Díaz
- Bengochea
- Brisas del Capiro
- Camacho
- Capiro
- Cardoso
- Centro
- Chambéry
- Domínguez
- El Carmen
- El Gigante
- El Vaquerito (Puerto Escondido)
- Escambray
- Escambray Este
- Escambray Norte
- José Martí
- Las Minas
- Los Sirios
- Moro
- Osvaldo Herrera (Dobarganes)
- Páez
- Raúl Sancho (Condado)
- San Daniel
- Sandino
- Santa Catalina
- Sub Planta
- Tenería
- Tirzo Díaz
- Universidad
- Vigía
- Vigía Sur
- Villa Josefa
- Virginia

There are 18 wards (consejos populares) of Santa Clara. They include Centro, Caprio, Santa Catalina, Vigía, Sandino, Hospital, Escambray, Chambery, Virginia, Condado Norte, Condado Sur, Abel Santamaría, and José Martí are a part of the Urban area. Camacho Libertad, Antón Díaz, Aereopuerto, Univerisidad, Manajanabo, Sakenaf, Hatillo-Yabú, and Camilo Cienfuegos are part of the Semi-Urban area and San Miguel is in the Rural Area.

=== Climate ===
Climate data for Santa Clara
| Month | Jan | Feb | Mar | Apr | May | Jun | Jul | Aug | Sep | Oct | Nov | Dec | Year |
|---|---|---|---|---|---|---|---|---|---|---|---|---|---|
| Mean daily maximum °C (°F) | 27 (81) | 28 (82) | 29 (84) | 29 (85) | 31 (87) | 32 (89) | 32 (90) | 32 (90) | 32 (89) | 31 (88) | 28 (83) | 28 (82) | 30 (86) |
| Mean daily minimum °C (°F) | 17 (63) | 17 (62) | 18 (64) | 19 (67) | 21 (69) | 22 (71) | 22 (72) | 22 (72) | 22 (71) | 22 (71) | 19 (67) | 18 (64) | 20 (68) |
| Average precipitation mm (inches) | 18 (0.7) | 25 (1) | 33 (1.3) | 46 (1.8) | 120 (4.7) | 150 (6) | 120 (4.8) | 160 (6.3) | 170 (6.8) | 160 (6.3) | 41 (1.6) | 23 (0.9) | 1,070 (42.2) |
Source: Weatherbase

== Demographics ==
In 2022, the municipality of Santa Clara had a population of 245,959. With a total area of 514 km^{2} (198 sq mi), it had a population density of 480/km^{2} (1,200/sq mi).

== Attractions ==
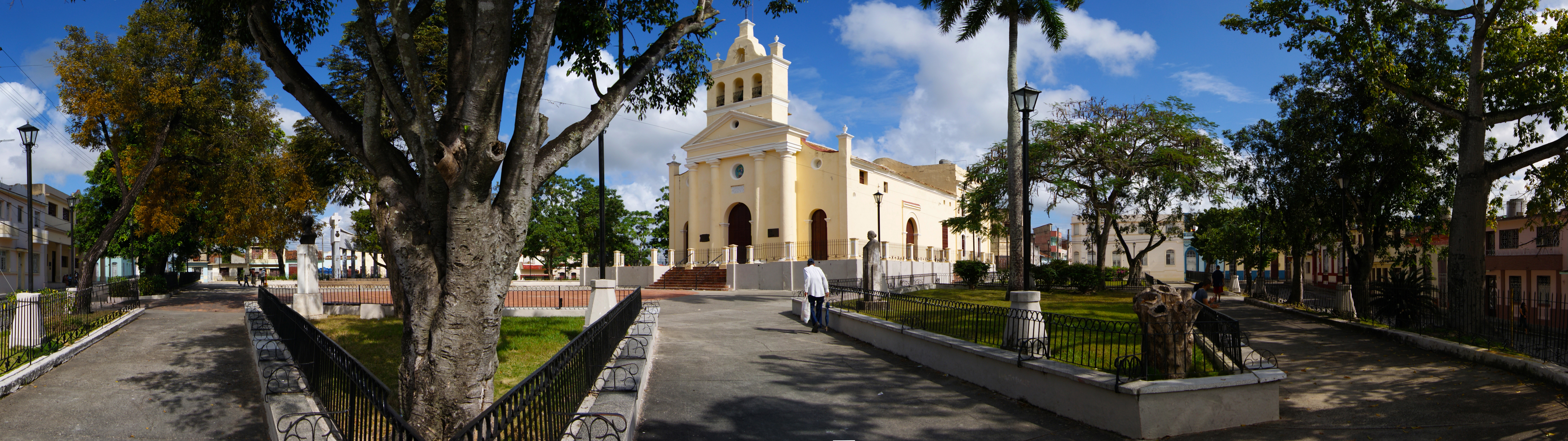
Panoramic view of Parque del Carmen, surrounding the Iglesia del Carmen (2012)

Parque Vidal is located at the center of the city, taking up an entire square block. In the park, there is a statue of Marta Abreu, who is admired by the people of Santa Clara. Bordering the park is the Santa Clara Libre (formerly the Santa Clara Hilton), Gran Hotel, Teatro La Caridad (a National Monument of Cuba), Plaza del Mercado Central, the former city hall, and the Colonia Española de Santa Clara center of dance, exhibiting the most attractive and unique traditional customs of hinterland Cuba.

Parque Vidal is one of the most quintessential Cuban places in Cuba. During the afternoons, people, especially singles, visit the park to meet others. Although not widely practised in recent times, the custom was to walk around the park. The women walk along the inner part of the park, while the men walk along the outer side. Another lost custom is for locals to set up a platform and perform improvisations with their guitars on late Sunday afternoons. They dressed for that day with their guayaberas and highly polished shoes.

Santa Clara is home to a mausoleum that houses the remains of Che Guevara and sixteen of his fellow combatants killed in 1967 during the Bolivia campaign. There is also a reconstruction of Guevara derailing the train during the Battle of Santa Clara.

Prior to 1 January 1977, Santa Clara was located in Las Villas Province. On that date, as part of a general administrative reordering of Cuba's provinces, Las Villas Province was reordered into the provinces of Villa Clara, Cienfuegos, and Sancti Spíritus. Santa Clara is in the province now known as Villa Clara.

Other local landmarks include:

- Parque del Carmen (Carmen's Park) – foundation site of the city
- Parque de los Martires (Martyrs' Park)
- Parque de la Pastora (Our Lady Shepherdess Park)
- Parque de la Justicia (Justice's Park)
- Parque del Tren Blindado (The Armored Train Park-Museum ) – a National Monument of Cuba
- Mausoleo Che Guevara (Monument and Mausoleum of Ernesto "Che" Guevara)
- Catedral de Santa Clara de Asís (Saint Claire of Asis Cathedral)
- Boulevard 1889
- Centro Cultural El Mejunje (Cultural Centre "El Mejunje")
- Loma del Capiro – a hill overlooking the city
- Villa Clara Provincial Museum – showcases a collection of art and social and natural history
- University "Marta Abreu" of Las Villas – the province's secondary education institution

== Transport ==
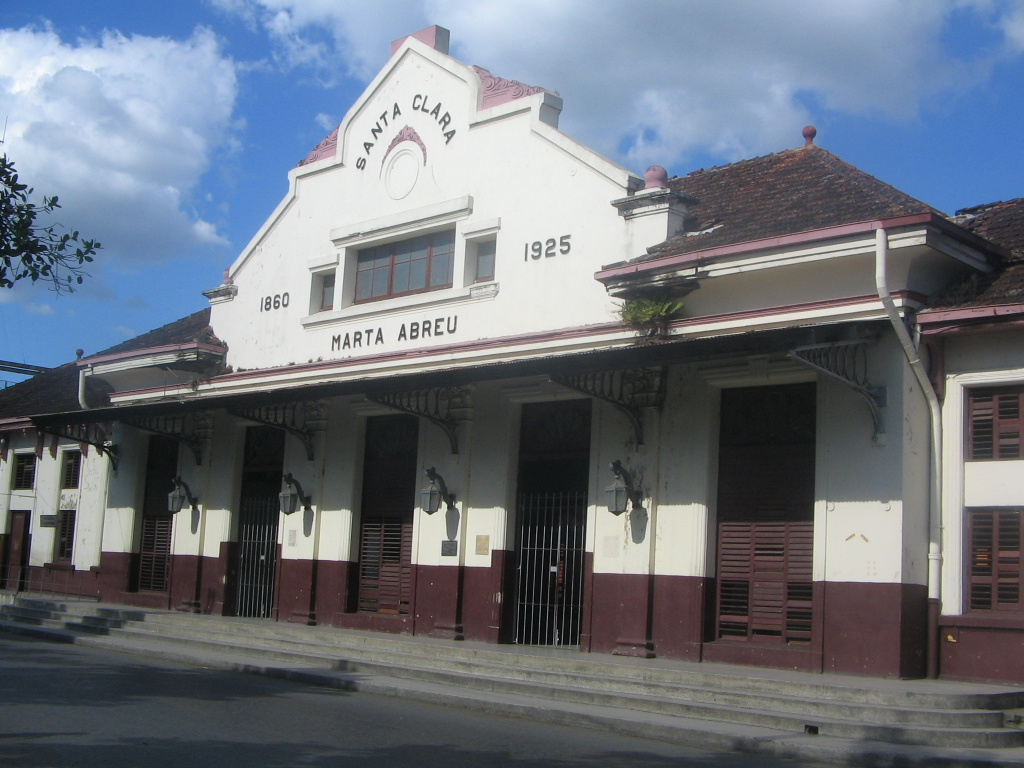
Santa Clara station building

Santa Clara is crossed by the Carretera Central highway (CC) and Autopista A1 motorway. The Santa Clara Beltway serving the city is directly linked to the motorway. The main railway station, Santa Clara railway station, is part of the principal line of the country, the Havana-Santa Clara-Camagüey-Santiago. Abel Santamaría Airport, located 11 km (6.8 mi) to the north, is the city airport, serving flights to Italy, Canada, France, and Poland, along with domestic and other flights.

The Santa Clara beltway connects the city with other roads going to the other municipalities in the province, these include:

- The Autopista Santa Clara (A1-1), to the Autopista Nacional, Ranchuelo, and later the capital of Cuba, Havana
- The Carretera Central (N-1), to the town of Esperanza and Santo Domingo in the west, and Placetas in the east
- Road of Sagua (4-221), to Cifuentes, Sagua La Grande, and later by the Circuito Norte to Quemado de Güines and Corralillo.
- Road of Malezas (4-311), to Abel Santamaría Airport and Encrucijada
- Santa Clara–Caibarién Road (4-321), to Camajuaní, Remedios, Caibarién, and later the tourist resort of Cayo Santa María
- Santa Clara–Fomento Road (4-474), to the town of Mataguá, Manicaragua, and later Fomento in Sancti Spíritus Province

== Education ==
Santa Clara is home to the University "Marta Abreu" of Las Villas (Spanish: Universidad Central "Marta Abreu" de Las Villas (UCLV)). The university offers bachelor's, master's, and doctoral degrees and boasts the graduation of 35,000 engineers, licensees, architects, medics, and veterinarians, of which 1,000 are foreigners from 47 countries. Additionally, it has educated more than 310 doctors and more than 1600 magisters.

Santa Clara is also home to the Universidad de Ciencias Médicas de Villa Clara, founded in 1966.

== Notable people ==
- Marta Abreu (1845−1909), benefactress
- José Bernal, artist
- Yuniesky Betancourt, Major League Baseball shortstop
- Mike Cuellar, Major League Baseball pitcher
- Aledmys Díaz, Major League Baseball shortstop
- Newton Estape Vila, photographer and journalist
- José Fernández (1992−2016), Major League Baseball pitcher
- Mirka Francia, Cuban-Italian volleyball player
- Rubén González, pianist
- Benny 'Kid' Paret (1937−1962), boxer
- Moraima Secada, singer
- Miguel Díaz-Canel, First Secretary of the Communist Party and leader of Cuba since 2021
- Gerardo Machado y Morales, general, 5th president of Cuba (1925–1933)
- Marilyn Pupo, Cuban-Puerto Rican actress and television host
- Dafnis Prieto Cuban-American drummer, composer, bandleader, and educator
- Eslinda Núñez, actress
- Francisco Javier Balmaseda, writer
- Ricardo Vazquez, Political Prisoner/Plantado

== Twin towns/Sister cities ==
Santa Clara is twinned with:

- Cali, Colombia (1994)
- Oviedo, Asturias, Spain (1995)
- Bloomington, Indiana, United States (1999)
- Cheboksary, Chuvash Republic, Russia (2004)
- São Carlos, São Paulo, Brazil (2005)

== Image gallery ==
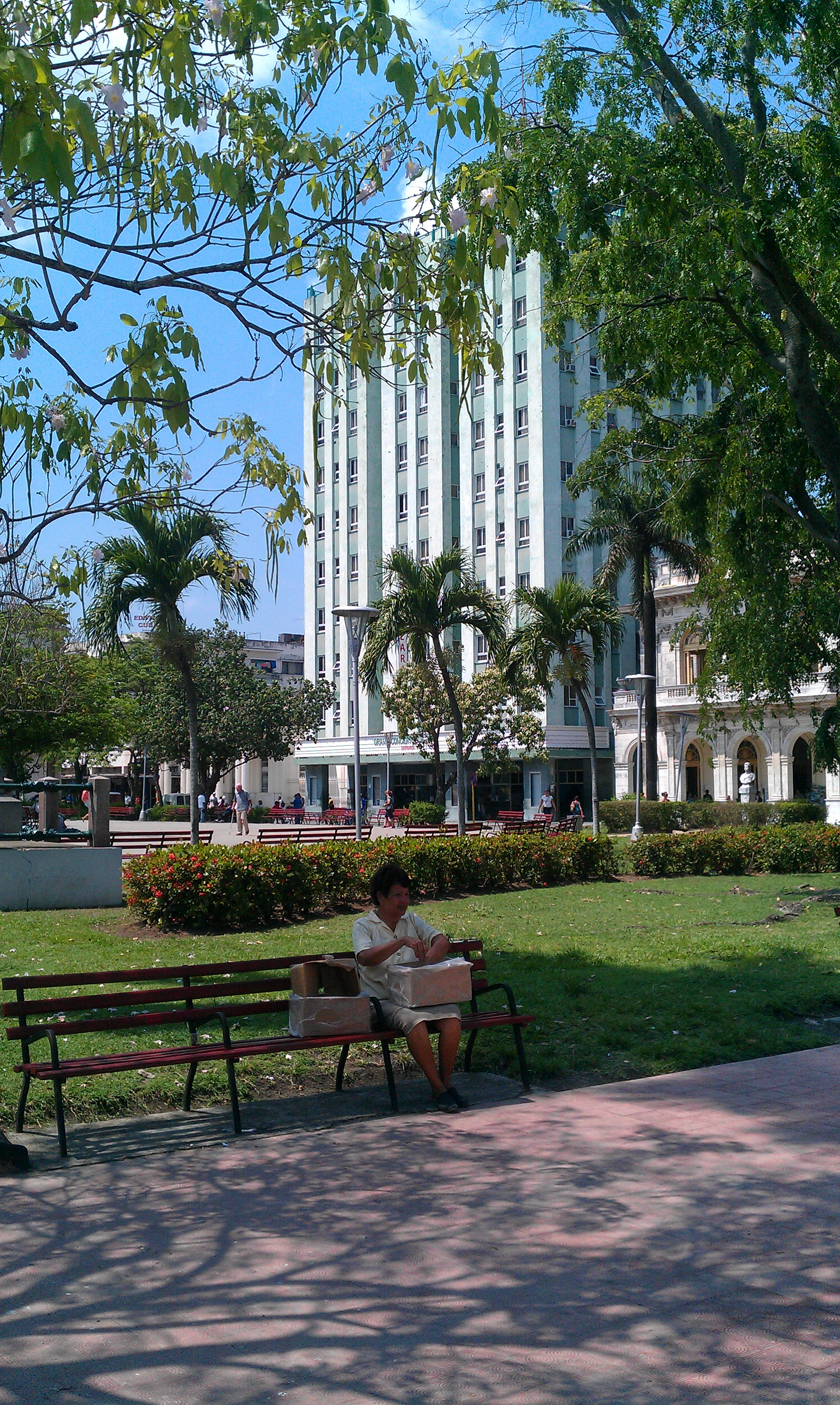
The Santa Clara Libre hotel across Parque Vidal was the tallest building outside Havana during the 1950s and 1960s.

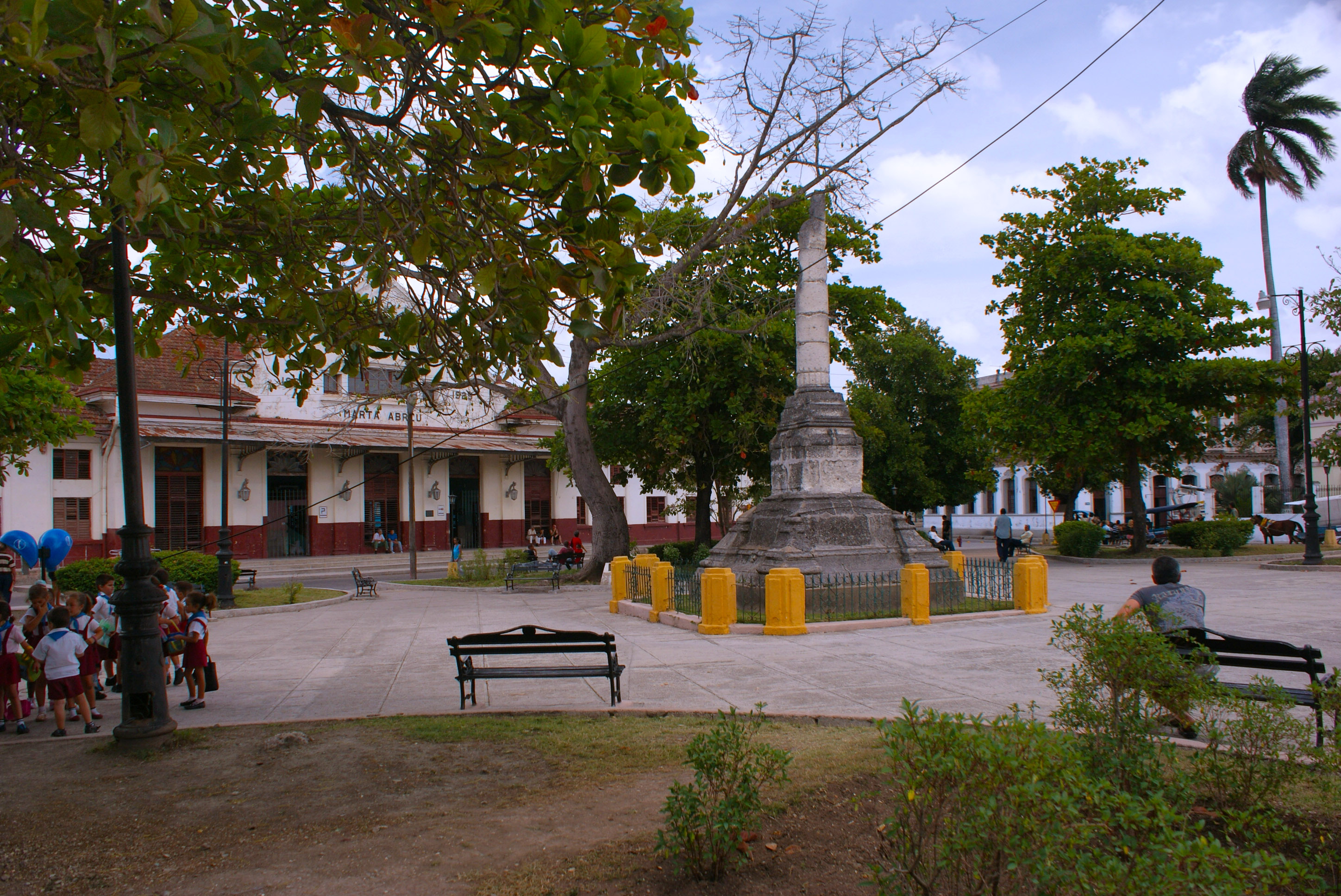
The Marta Abreu train station is located across Martyrs' Park. At the center is the truncated pillar monument dedicated to the martyrs of the Colonial Independence War.

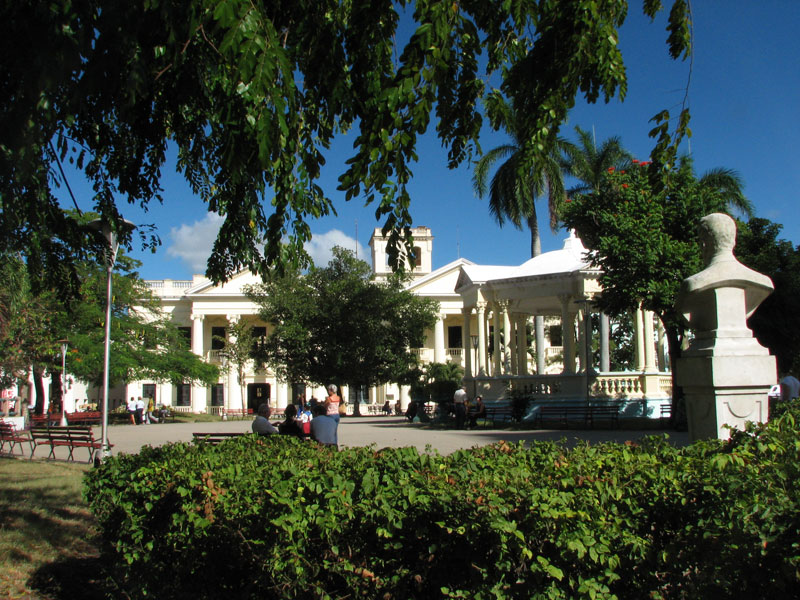
Parque Vidal in downtown Santa Clara

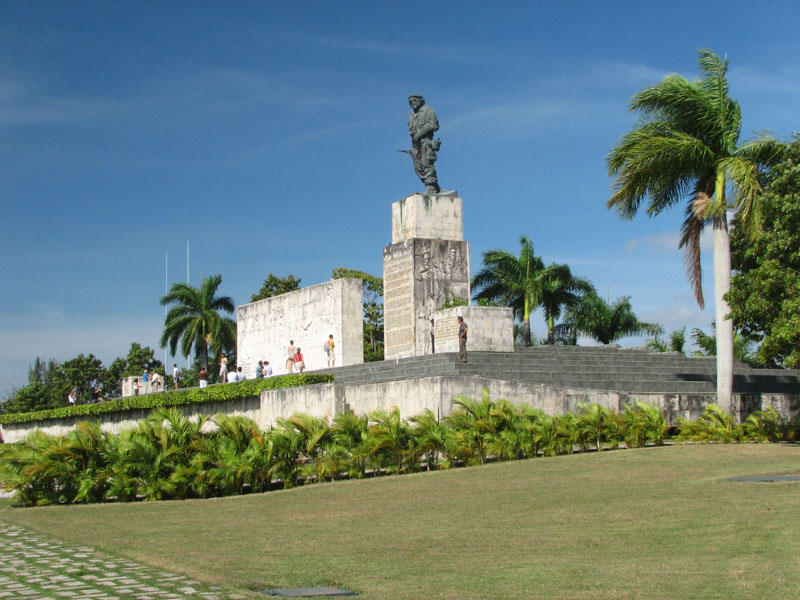
Che Guevara's monument and museum

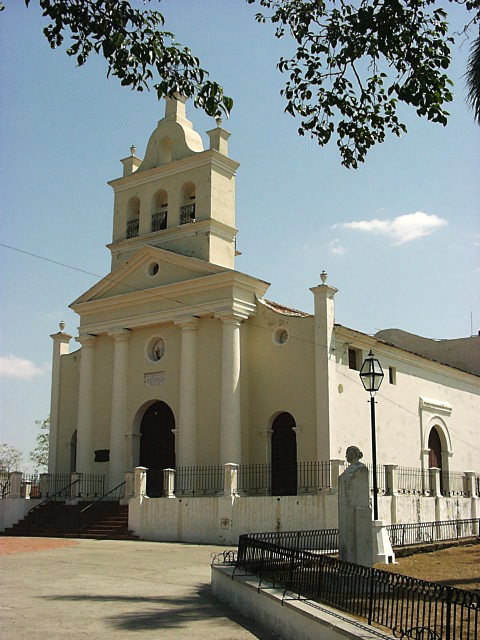
Carmen Church, which is the oldest church in the city.

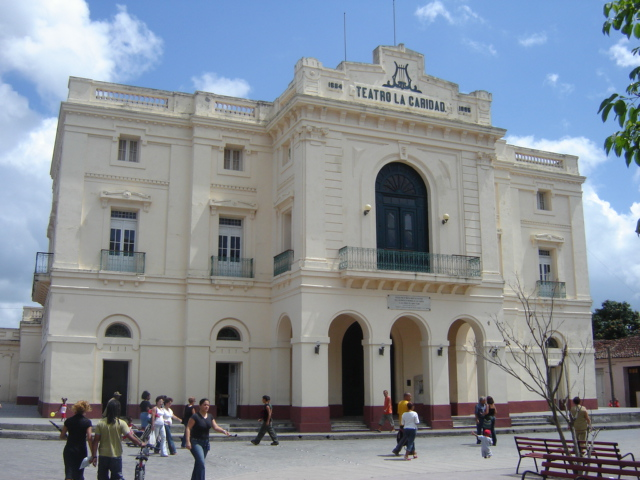
Teatro La Caridad

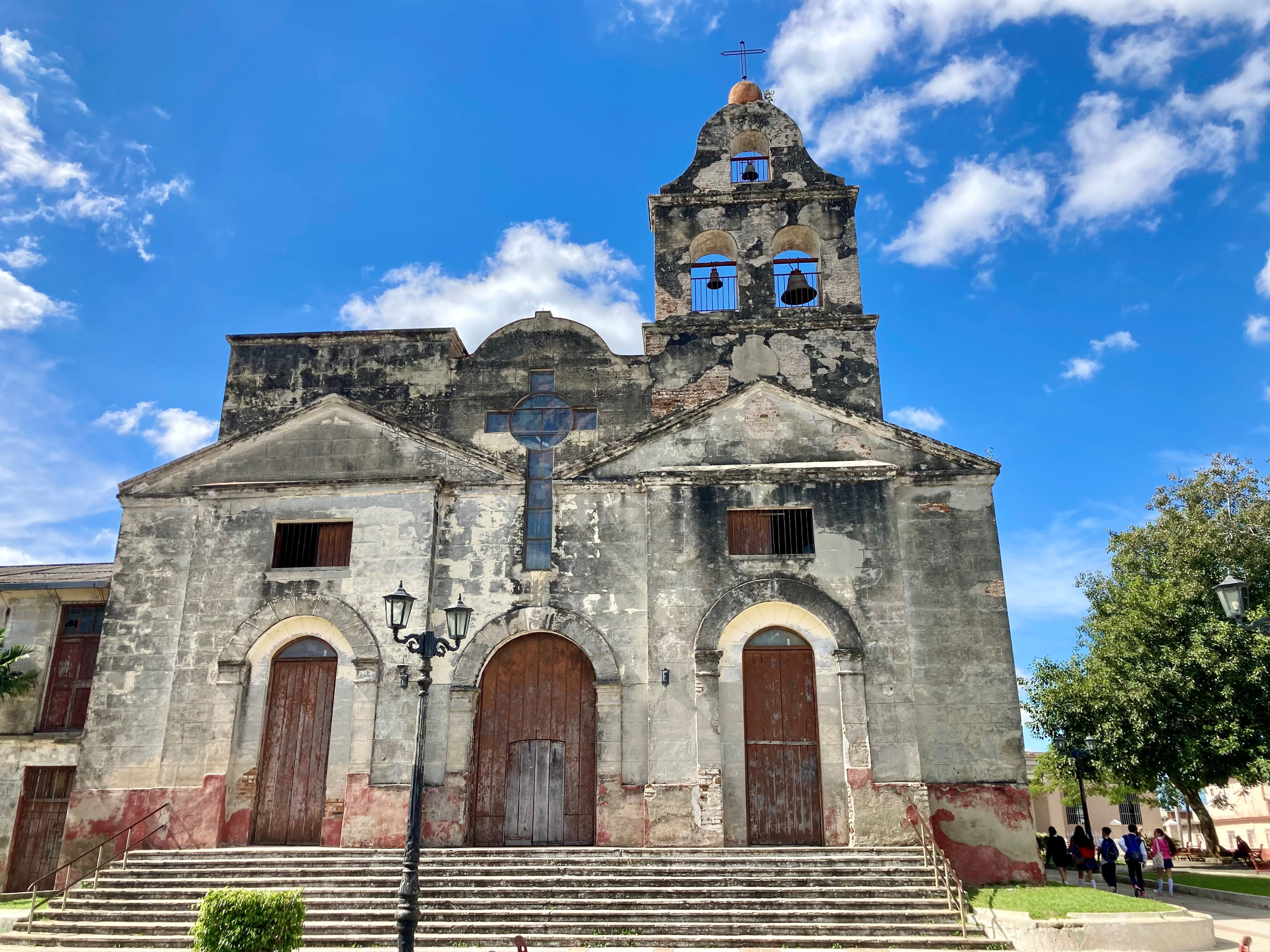
Iglesia La Divina Pastora
