= Margarito Lanza Flores =

Cuban anti-communist rebel (1938–1962)

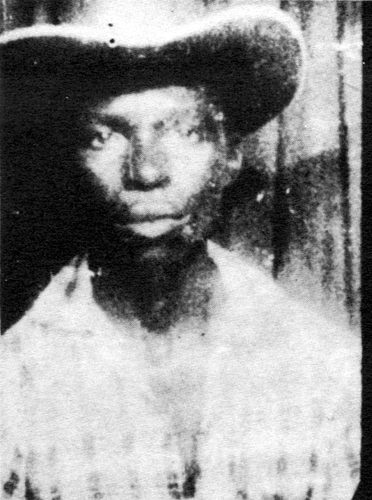
- Born: 1938; Corralillo, Las Villas, Cuba
- Died: 2 March 1962 (aged 23/24); Quemado de Güines, Santa Clara Province, Cuba
- Cause of death: Execution by firing squad
- Other name: Tondique
- Occupation: Farmer

Margarito Lanza Flores (1938 – 2 March 1962), known as Tondique, was a Cuban rebel peasant and an active participant in the Escambray rebellion. He was one of the first Afro-Cubans to fight against Fidel Castro's government, leading a rebel unit and leading the uprising in northern Las Villas. He was captured and executed by government forces.

Born into a poor Afro-Cuban farming family in Carralillo, in Las Villas, he received a primary education. From a young age, he worked on farms in Sagua la Grande. According to those who knew him, he was known for his hard work, good character, and lack of legal issues. There are varying opinions about Lanza Flores' stance during the Cuban Revolution. Some sources claim he participated in the overthrow of Fulgencio Batista, but it is more commonly said that he remained apolitical until 1960.

Shortly after Fidel Castro came to power, Cuba passed its first Agrarian Reform Law. Lanza Flores' small farm was neither divided nor confiscated. He, like other Afro-Cuban peasants, belonged to the poor farming class, and the new authorities clearly favored these groups. The agrarian reform might have even been beneficial for him. However, Margarito Lanza Flores was anti-communist and, regardless of his personal views, hostile to Castro's government. In 1960, he joined the Escambray rebellion. This position was rare among Afro-Cubans, who mostly supported Castro at the time.

== Rebellion ==
Along with a group of friends, Margarito Lanza Flores formed an anti-communist and anti-government guerrilla unit. He adopted the partisan alias Tondique. His area of operations was in the northern part of Las Villas province, covering the regions of Corralillo and Sagua la Grande. The actions of Tondique's unit were crucial to the uprising as most of the Escambray rebels operated in the southern and central parts of the province. Tondique's position in the north has been compared to that of the rebel chief commander Osvaldo Ramírez García.

Tondique's unit attacked government army units, the Ministry of the Interior, and the National Revolutionary Militias, seizing or destroying state properties and cooperatives. They also carried out reprisals against communist activists suspected of collaborating with the State Security Organs. In this regard, it was later observed that under military conditions, the kind-hearted Tondique began to develop a fierce hatred toward the enemy.

The young peasant proved to be a skilled military strategist. He repeatedly managed to evade capture in difficult situations. His small but mobile unit maneuvered effectively, changing locations, taking refuge in specially dug holes, dispersing, and then regrouping. Tondique was popular among the local peasants, who recognized his charismatic qualities. He earned a "Robin Hood" reputation for distributing food from captured government warehouses.

Tondique knew many of the local peasants. He never stayed in one place for more than a couple of days. When we were heavily pursued, he would disband the unit and tell us, "We'll meet at such-and-such place." The following week, we'd regroup on a hill or farm, carry out the operation, and move forward again, always keeping a gap between us and the enemy. — Luis Arroyo, Tondique's guerrilla fighter

The National Revolutionary Militias tried to avoid missions related to the pursuit of Tondique, but these were marked by failed attempts or heavy losses. Tondique was especially hated by Fidel Castro's supporters because he disrupted the image of supposed unanimous support for the regime among poor Afro-Cubans. At the same time, many military personnel and militia members respected Tondique as a worthy opponent.

To eliminate Tondique's unit, a large government force was sent under the command of Lizardo Proenza Sánchez, equipped with armored vehicles and helicopters. Their movements were tracked from the air. In December 1961, the unit was finally surrounded by superior forces and defeated in a fierce confrontation. However, Tondique, his second-in-command Macho Mora, and several others managed to escape once again.

Tondique was hiding in a crypt in a cemetery in Corralillo, where local peasants secretly supplied him with food and water. By the end of February, he was located once again. His arrest was delayed due to the risk of heavy casualties, and Tondique attempted to escape the encirclement once more. The pursuit was led by the police chief of the Escambray, Captain Víctor Dreke, also Afro-Cuban and originally from Sagua la Grande, a year older than Tondique, at 23 years old. This "battle of young Black compatriots" was later regarded as an epic confrontation.

== Death ==
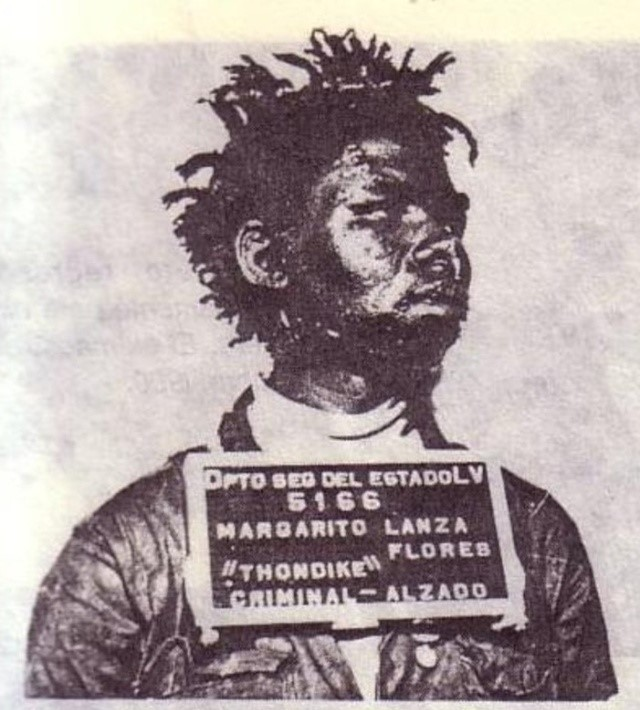
Margarito Lanza Flores was captured after being burned in the Canaveral.

On 2 March 1962, Tondique and Macho Mora were once again discovered by helicopter in Quemado de Güines. Tondique attempted to hide in a field of reeds. When the pursuers set the field on fire, Tondique took refuge from the flames in a hole he had dug there. He was captured, burned and on the brink of suffocation. Upon identifying Tondique, they recognized him as the commander of the anti-communist partisans in the area.

The guards wanted to beat him, but Commander Lizardo Proenza intervened, saying, "Don't touch him. This is a real man."

He was subjected to intense interrogation without receiving any medication for the pain from his burns. The interrogation was conducted by Víctor Dreke, but Tondique refused to speak with him. Dreke accused Tondique of banditry and ordered his execution without trial, under the Emergency Law 988 of 26 November 1961.

Víctor Dreke said he would send a firing squad. The partisan commander Tondique, smiling, looked him in the eyes and said, "Don't worry, Black man. You know, a Black Cuban knows how to behave like a man. Do whatever you want."

According to some reports, before his execution, Margarito Lanza Flores, Tondique, once again tried to resist and escape but was shot alongside his companions under the Rodrigo Bridge. There are chronological discrepancies regarding the date of this event. Some sources claim it was on 12 December 1961, while others more frequently state it was on 2 March 1962.

== Memory ==
Officially, Cuban authorities view Margarito Lanza Flores as a "brutal counterrevolutionary bandit." The Cuban dissident movement considers him "a humble Black worker who rose up against dictatorship and oppression." Simultaneously, Margarito Lanza Flores is symbolically contrasted with Víctor Dreke, a prominent figure of the ruling regime. The name Captain Tondique has become a humanitarian project by Cuban dissidents in the city of Colón. Activists organized free meals for the poor, the sick, the elderly, and homeless children. The initiative is being pursued by the authorities, even because of its name.

== See also ==
- Eusebio Peñalver
- Tomás San Gil
