= Plinio Prieto =

Cuban anti-communist dissident (1923–1960)

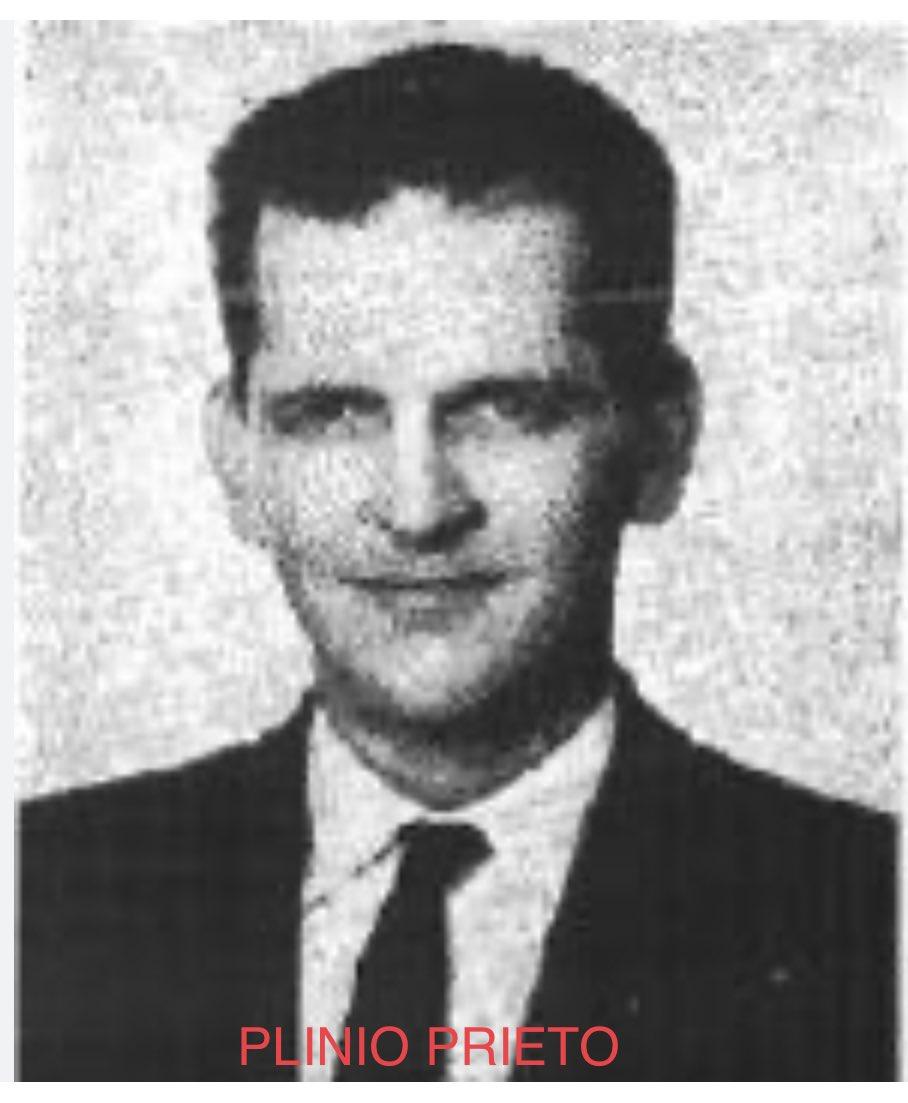
- Born: 21 June 1923; Santa Clara, Cuba
- Died: 12 October 1960 (aged 37); Escambray Mountains, Cuba
- Cause of death: Execution by firing squad
- Occupations: English professor and rebel
- Spouse: Amparo Posada
- Children: 2, Fernando and Georgina
- Parent(s): José R. Prieto; Maria C. Ruiz

Plinio Prieto Ruiz (21 June 1923 – 13 October 1960) was a Cuban revolutionary, captain in the revolutionary army, and a participant in the overthrow of Fulgencio Batista as well as the Escambray rebellion. He was one of the organizers of the Second National Front of the Escambray. After the success of the Cuban Revolution, he opposed Fidel Castro's dictatorship and joined the armed rebel movement, where he was captured, sentenced to death, and executed.

== Cuban Revolution ==
Born into a family of doctors, he was the third of four siblings, children of Dr. José R. Prieto and Dr. Maria C. Ruiz. As a child, he lived with his family in New York City, where he attended elementary school and learned to speak English. Upon returning to Cuba, he studied at the Marist Brothers Catholic School and the Secondary Education Institute of Havana. He later enrolled in the Law Faculty at the University of Havana. For 12 years, Plinio Prieto worked as an English teacher.

Politically, Plinio Prieto was a strong supporter of democracy and opposed Fulgencio Batista's regime. He was a member of the Authentic Cuban Revolutionary Party and was suspended from teaching for political reasons. He joined the anti-government underground and actively participated in the Cuban Revolution, organizing an anti-Batista propaganda network and major sabotage operations. He was arrested multiple times by Batista's police, which forced him to move to the United States and Mexico. Upon secretly returning to Cuba, he joined the guerrilla movement of the Second National Front of the Escambray, led by Eloy Gutiérrez Menoyo and William Alexander Morgan. He participated in battles against Batista's troops and was promoted to the rank of captain in the revolutionary army.

== Escambray rebellion ==
After the victory of the Cuban Revolution, Plinio Prieto held military positions for a time and enjoyed Fidel Castro's trust. He commanded a government detachment assigned to defend Trinidad from a possible invasion by the troops of Dominican dictator Rafael Trujillo. However, Prieto's democratic and anti-communist views quickly led to a conflict with Castro. He established ties with the Revolutionary Reconstruction Movement (MRR) and rebel groups in the Escambray.

He organized a clandestine anti-government radio station in the Escambray Mountains of Guanayara and called for resistance against Fidel Castro's dictatorship. In 1960, Plinio Prieto was one of the main rebel commanders, along with Sinecio Walsh, Evelio Duque, Osvaldo Ramírez García, and Edel Montiel. Prieto served as the ideologue and political organizer of the anti-Castro movement. He attempted to coordinate rebel attacks in the Escambray with radio propaganda and political actions from the Authentic Party and the MRR in Havana. At the same time, he had operational connections in the United States, including the Central Intelligence Agency, which helped organize logistics and supplies for the rebels.

The armed resistance during the early stages of the Escambray rebellion was led by Sinecio Walsh. Many other commanders gathered around his detachment in the mountainous town of Nuevo Mundo. Prieto tried to establish direct contact with him through Diosdado Mesa's group, but was unable to make a direct connection. In early September 1960, government forces under the command of Manuel Fajardo and Juan Vitalio Acuña Núñez launched a massive offensive against Walsh's detachment. The rebels, including Plinio Prieto, began dispersing to their hideouts. The State Security Organs of the G-2 learned of Prieto's movement toward Cienfuegos Province through information provided by the recruited associate Félix Hurtado. Prieto was in a small group transporting heavy radio equipment. On 1 October 1960, they encountered a detachment of the National Revolutionary Militia and were captured after a gunfight.

== Death ==
Plinio Prieto was initially held in the Topes de Collantes prison in the Escambray, then transferred to the State Security prison in Havana. He was in complete isolation: he was not even given basic necessities and was denied a meeting with the lawyer Benito Besada. Ten days later, Prieto was taken to Santa Clara. As part of a group of rebels, he appeared before the revolutionary court. The court was presided over by First Lieutenant Claudio López Cardet, and included Captain Ornedo Rodríguez Ruiz, First Lieutenant Leonel Tornes Fardinho, First Lieutenant Erasmo Anoseto Machado, and Lieutenant José Ferrer. The prosecution was represented by military prosecutor, Army Captain Juan Escalona Reguera.

Riots broke out in the city. The police dispersed the protests in support of the accused. Of the foreign correspondents, only Soviet journalists were allowed to attend the trial, while American journalists were denied entry. The political decision had been made beforehand. María Caridad Ruiz, Plinio Prieto’s mother, who tried to organize his defense, later said that prosecutor Juan Escalona Reguera had received a sentencing directive from Raúl Castro. Prieto himself refused to testify, behaved with overt and disdainful indifference, and even fell asleep during one of the court hearings.

The Revolutionary Court sentenced Sinecio Walsh, José Palomino Colón, Ángel Rodríguez del Sol, Porfirio Remberto Ramírez, and Plinio Prieto to death. They were executed late in the afternoon on 12 October 1960, at the La Campana militia base around midnight. According to the testimony of Catholic priest Olegario de Cifuentes, who was present at the execution, Prieto acted bravely and sarcastically gave instructions to the firing squad. His last words were, "I believe in God and in people."

== Personal life ==
Plinio Prieto was married and had a son and a daughter, Fernando and Georgina. His wife, Amparo Posada, shared his views and was a political ally of Prieto. In his political activities, Plinio Prieto was known for his independence of thought and action, which often led to serious conflicts even with close collaborators. According to María Caridad Ruiz, the order to eliminate Prieto came from Eloy Gutiérrez Menoyo, but the executors, due to personal sympathy for his son, refused to carry out the task. Plinio Prieto was buried in the Santa Clara cemetery. On 22 January 1998, Pope John Paul II held the first Mass in Cuba in Santa Clara, not far from the execution site.

== See also ==
- Escambray rebellion
