= Cheito León =

Cuban anti-communist rebel (1938–1964)

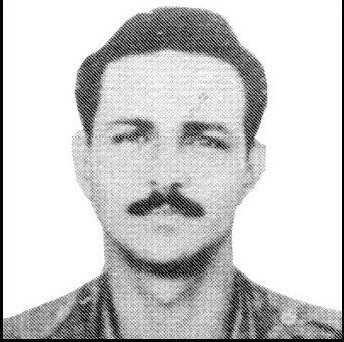
- Born: José León Jiménez; 1938; Trinidad, Cuba
- Died: 25 May 1964 (aged 26); Escambray, Cuba
- Cause of death: Suicide by hand grenade
- Other name: "Cheito León"

José León Jiménez (1938 – 25 May 1964), known as Cheito León, was a Cuban anti-communist rebel, and the last commander of the Escambray rebellion guerrilla army after the execution of his comrade Julio Emilio Carretero. He ordered the execution of G-2/LCB agent Alberto Delgado and was killed after detonating in his hands before his capture by government forces, killing both himself and two of his pursuers.

== Early life ==
The early years are not reflected in the sources. It is known that José León Jiménez came from an urban family, graduated from school in Trinidad and worked as a truck driver. He held anti-communist views and opposed the government of Fidel Castro. In 1961, José León Jiménez decided to take up armed struggle against the Castro regime. Together with his brother Berardo, he attracted nineteen people to his group. To receive basic military training and weapons, they enlisted in the National Revolutionary Militias. After several weeks of military training, they headed to the Escambray Mountains, capturing weapons and automatic rifles manufactured in Czechoslovakia.

== Escambray rebellion ==
For three years, José León Jiménez and his squad fought against troops and the National Revolutionary Militias as part of the National Liberation Army (ELN). León Jiménez personally participated in dozens of clashes. He adopted the nickname Cheito León, which became a party pseudonym. Brother Berardo was killed within a few months. Over the years, the ELN changed commanders four times: Evelio Duque was dismissed and emigrated to the United States, Osvaldo Ramírez García and Tomás San Gil were killed in battle. From the spring of 1963, the ELN was headed by Julio Emilio Carretero. Cheito León was his deputy.

By the beginning of 1964, the situation of the rebels was hopeless. Thousands of fighters were killed or imprisoned. The numerical superiority of the government forces in numbers and weapons was evident. The strict administrative control of the regime made it possible to closely isolate the rebels. The ration distribution system complicated the supply of food, and the battle zone was invaded by troops of the National Revolutionary Militias. Informants from the State Security Organs and the G-2, the Office of the Fight against Bandits (LCB) headed by Louis Philippe Denis were intensively and unsuccessfully introduced into the rebel environment.

Julio Emilio Carretero was inclined to sail to Florida, establish a rebel base there and organize periodic military raids. This plan was questionable in itself, since the American administrations of John F. Kennedy and Lyndon B. Johnson, after the failure of the Bay of Pigs Invasion and the resolution of the Cuban Missile Crisis, lost their previous interest in the Cuban anti-Castro movement. However, this provided a theoretical opportunity to preserve rebel forces. Carretero handed over command of the ELN to 26-year-old Cheito León.

The plans for the exit came to the attention of the State Security Organs and were put under control. The special operation was carried out by G-2/LCB agent Alberto Delgado, who gained the trust of the rebels. In February, the government managed to capture the group of Cheito's childhood friend, Maro Borges. Julio Emilio Carretero, who was unaware of this, also succumbed to the deception and on March 9, 1964, was captured on an "American" ship with a group of companions, among whom Zoila Águila Almeida stands out.

== Legacy ==
Attitudes toward José León Jiménez depend on political orientation. Cuban officials describe him as a "counterrevolutionary bandit." He is also blamed for the death of Alberto Delgado, who was hailed as a hero by the authorities. Cuban dissidents consider Cheito a hero of the liberation struggle and contrast Che Guevara as someone who did not give up. Regarding Delgado's fate, they point out that Fidel Castro also ordered the killing of informants during the guerrilla war, "and these were called ‘executions,’ not ‘crimes."
