= Porfirio Remberto Ramírez =

Cuban anti-communist rebel (1933–1960)

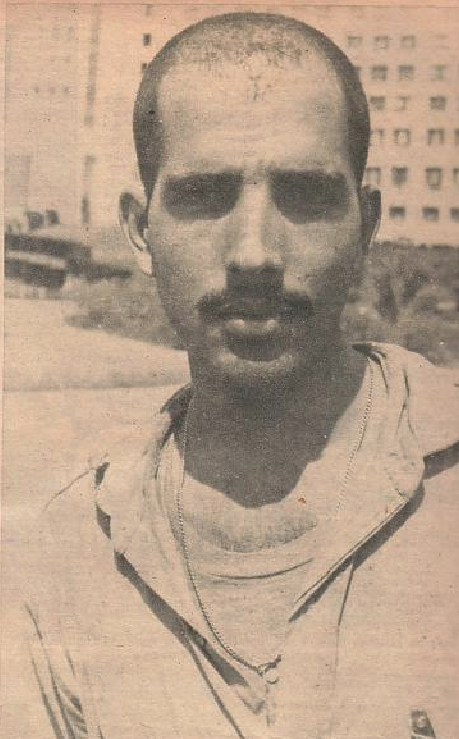
- Porfirio Ramírez was a prisoner at the former Topes de Collantes sanatorium
- Born: 1933; Antonio Díaz, Las Villas, Cuba
- Died: 12 October 1960 (aged 26/27); Manicaragua, Santa Clara Province, Cuba
- Cause of death: Execution by firing squad
- Other name: El Negro
- Occupations: Student activist and accountant

Porfirio Remberto Ramírez Ruiz (1933 – 12 October 1960) was a Cuban revolutionary, student activist, participant in the overthrow of the Fulgencio Batista regime, and a member of the armed resistance against Fidel Castro's regime. He was executed during the Escambray rebellion.

== Student leader ==
Born into a peasant family in the province of Las Villas, he dedicated himself to agricultural work from adolescence. He received his primary education in a rural school. Later, he moved to Santa Clara, where he graduated from a commercial school and entered the Marta Abreu University. He studied to become an economist. He was president of the University Students Federation in Las Villas. Porfirio Ramírez adopted democratic views and was a strong opponent of the Fulgencio Batista regime. He openly opposed the authorities and led a clandestine antigovernmental group associated with the Authentic Revolutionary Organization and the Revolutionary Directorate 13th of March. After leaving his studies, he headed to the Escambray Mountains, where he led an anti-Batista partisan detachment. He demonstrated leadership qualities of "charisma and recklessness." Due to his dark complexion, he was known by the nickname El Negro, although he was not Afro-Cuban. He held the rank of captain in the revolutionary army. Upon entering Santa Clara, he personally liberated the political prisoners who were held there.

== Rebellion ==
After the victory of the Cuban Revolution, Porfirio Ramírez returned to university. He continued his studies and worked as an accountant in Santa Clara. He was elected President of the University Student Federation (FEU) of the Province of Las Villas. Ramírez's democratic beliefs led him into conflict with Fidel Castro's government. Ramírez strongly condemned the apparent establishment of a new dictatorship.

In late August 1960, Porfirio Ramírez took up arms once again in the mountains and joined the Escambray rebellion. In its early stages, the rebel movement was led by the peasant Sinecio Walsh, a former guerrilla fighter of the 26th of July Movement. His detachment numbered about one hundred people. Other commanders, including Plinio Prieto, Vicente Méndez, Diosdado Mesa, Joaquín Membibre, and Porfirio Ramírez, gathered around Walsh's detachment.

"When Porfirio Ramírez took up arms with Castro, he was a guerrilla fighter. When he turned his weapon against Castro, he became a bandit." – Guillermo Fariñas.

== Execution ==
The main rebel camp was established in the mountain town of Nuevo Mundo. This concentration attracted the attention of government troops and militias, who were sent to the Escambray to suppress the uprising. After the death of militia lieutenant Obdulio Morales Torres (nephew of a prominent figure in the Castro regime, Félix Torres González) in a gunfight with Vicente Méndez’s group, government forces under the command of Manuel Fajardo and Juan Vitalio Acuña Núñez launched a massive offensive in Nuevo Mundo. The rebels retreated separately in small groups. During the retreat, several commanders were captured. Porfirio Ramírez was captured in a brief skirmish near Pico Tuerto; his location had been betrayed by one of his captured comrades.

Students from Santa Clara demonstrated in support of Porfirio Ramírez. The protests were dispersed by police and militias, but Fidel Castro promised Ramírez’s family that his life would be spared. However, on 12 October, a court in Santa Clara issued five death sentences, including that of Porfirio Ramírez. Around sixty ordinary rebels were sentenced to long prison terms. The night before his execution, Ramírez wrote a letter to his family and friends:

Anyone who has been through these horrors should be happy to die: death will alleviate oppression, shame, and cowardice and become an example for future generations. I had a few hours left, and I had never felt so secure in my life. I know: my death will not be in vain.

On the evening of October 12, 1960, Sinecio Walsh Ríos, Plinio Prieto, José Palomino Colón, Ángel Rodríguez del Sol, and Porfirio Remberto Ramírez were executed by firing squad at the La Campana militia camp near Manicaragua. Before his execution, His mother pleaded for clemency and Fidel promised that he would not be executed. Ramírez remained stoic and brave, sarcastically joking with the militia members of the firing squad. He was shot three times in the face. After his execution, two public demonstrations on behalf of Porfirio occurred in Santa Clara, which was broken up by police.

== Legacy ==
Porfirio Remberto Ramírez is a prominent figure in the Cuban dissident movement, regarded as one of the leading figures of the anti-Castro resistance. A student from a rural background and a staunch democrat, he fought against two dictatorships without resorting to violence against civilians, symbolizing, in his own way, the original ideals of the Cuban Revolution. The protests against Ramírez's execution were the first acts of peaceful protest in Cuba. In 2019, dissident Guillermo Fariñas sent an open letter to Cuban Minister of Higher Education, Ramón Saborido, defending professors and students persecuted for political reasons. Fariñas specifically highlighted Porfirio Ramírez's role in the Cuban student movement.

== See also ==
- Escambray rebellion
