= Julio Emilio Carretero =

Cuban anti-communist rebel (1928–1964)

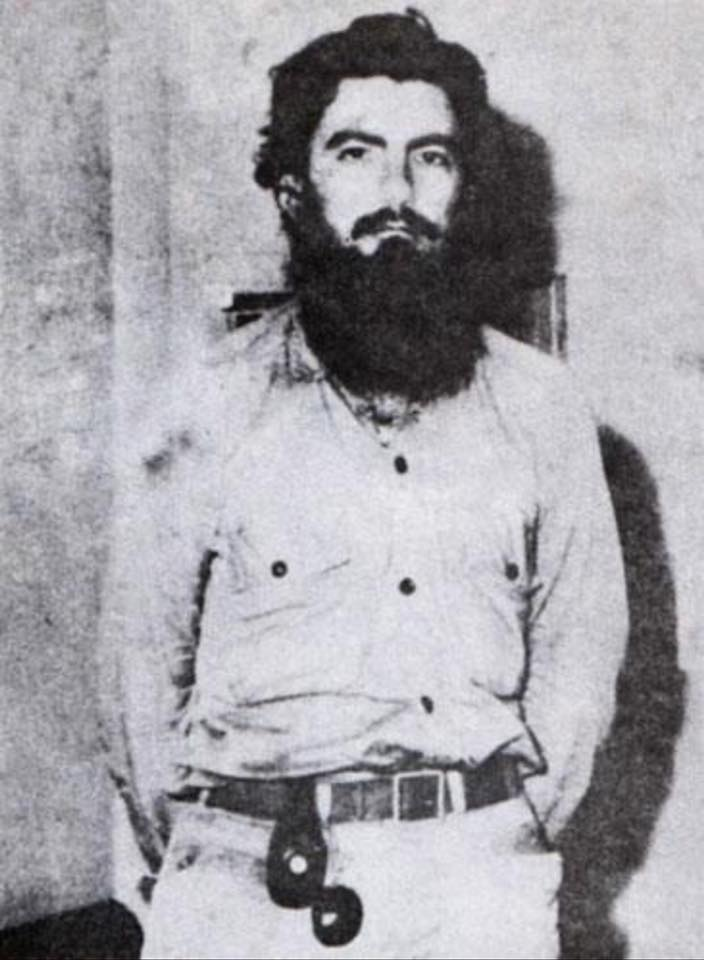
- Born: 1928; Trinidad, Cuba
- Died: 22 June 1964 (aged 35–36); Havana, Cuba
- Cause of death: Execution by firing squad
- Occupation: Police officer
- Relatives: Caridad Carretero Castillo

Julio Emilio Carretero Escajadillo (1928 – 22 June 1964) was a Cuban anti-communist rebel. Between 1963 and 1964, he served as a commander of the guerrilla army during the Escambray rebellion. Captured as a result of a special operation by State Security Organs, he was executed by firing squad at the Fortress of San Carlos de La Cabaña.

== Early years ==
Born into a peasant family on the outskirts of Trinidad, he served in the army under the government of Fulgencio Batista. This detail of Carretero's biography was later used by official propaganda. However, after the Cuban Revolution, Carretero was not accused of war crimes and was not prosecuted by the new authorities. He was recruited into the National Revolutionary Police Force in the Escambray district of Topes de Collantes, where he held the rank of sergeant.

In August 1960, Carretero joined the Escambray rebellion, which was led by Evelio Duque. He became a member of Osvaldo Ramírez García's detachment and was one of his closest collaborators, commanding the eighth rebel column. Even Fidel Castro's supporters recognized Carretero's authority among the peasants of the Escambray who joined his detachment.

== Rebel commander ==
=== Actions ===
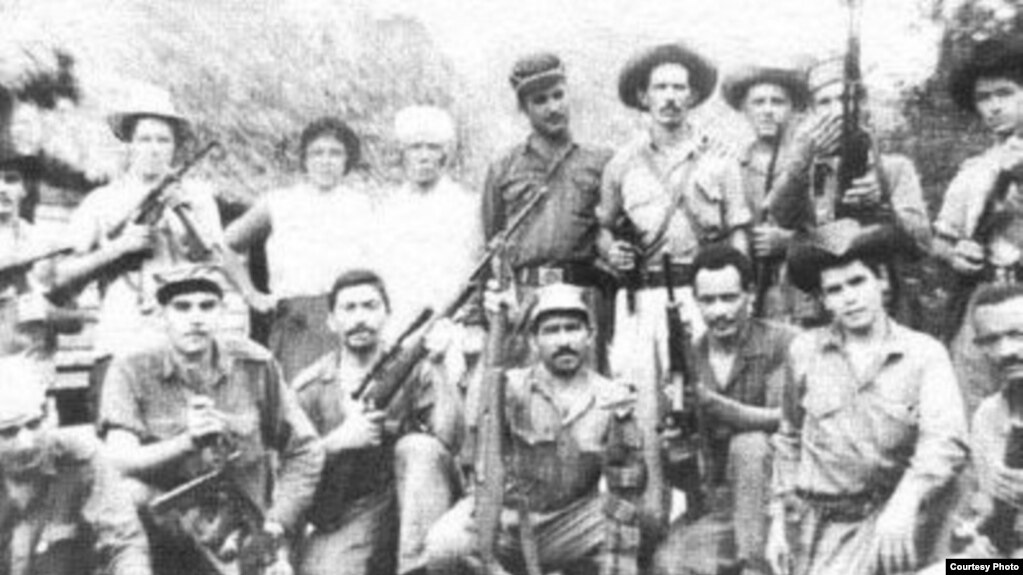
Meeting of the commanders during the Escambray rebellion. Among them were Osvaldo Ramírez García, Evelio Duque, 'El Congo' Pacheco, Tomás San Gil, and Julio Emilio Carretero.

In keeping with his surname, he adopted the rebel nickname "Carreta." He distinguished himself in battles against government troops and the National Revolutionary Militias. During the rebellion in early 1961, his capture or elimination was set as a separate objective. Carretero was wounded but managed to break out of the encirclement with the help of Tomás San Gil.

On 15 July 1961, Emilio Carretero participated in a meeting of rebel commanders in the mountain village of Zicatero. The National Liberation Army (ELN), the Cuban anti-communist army, was established under the command of Osvaldo Ramírez García. Emilio Carretero took command of one of the six guerrilla columns. This period saw the Second Clean-Up of the Escambray, a massive offensive by government forces. After the death of Osvaldo Ramírez on 16 April 1962, Carretero became the new deputy commander-in-chief to Tomás San Gil and the chief of staff of the ELN.

~~On 15 July 1961, Emilio Carretero participated in a meeting of rebel commanders in the mountain village of Zicatero. The National Liberation Army (ELN), the Cuban anti-communist army, was established under the command of Osvaldo Ramírez García. Carretero took command of one of the six guerrilla columns. This period also saw the second pacification of the Escambray, a massive offensive by government forces. After the death of Osvaldo Ramírez on 16 April 1962, Carretero became the new deputy commander-in-chief under Tomás San Gil and the chief of staff of the ELN.~~

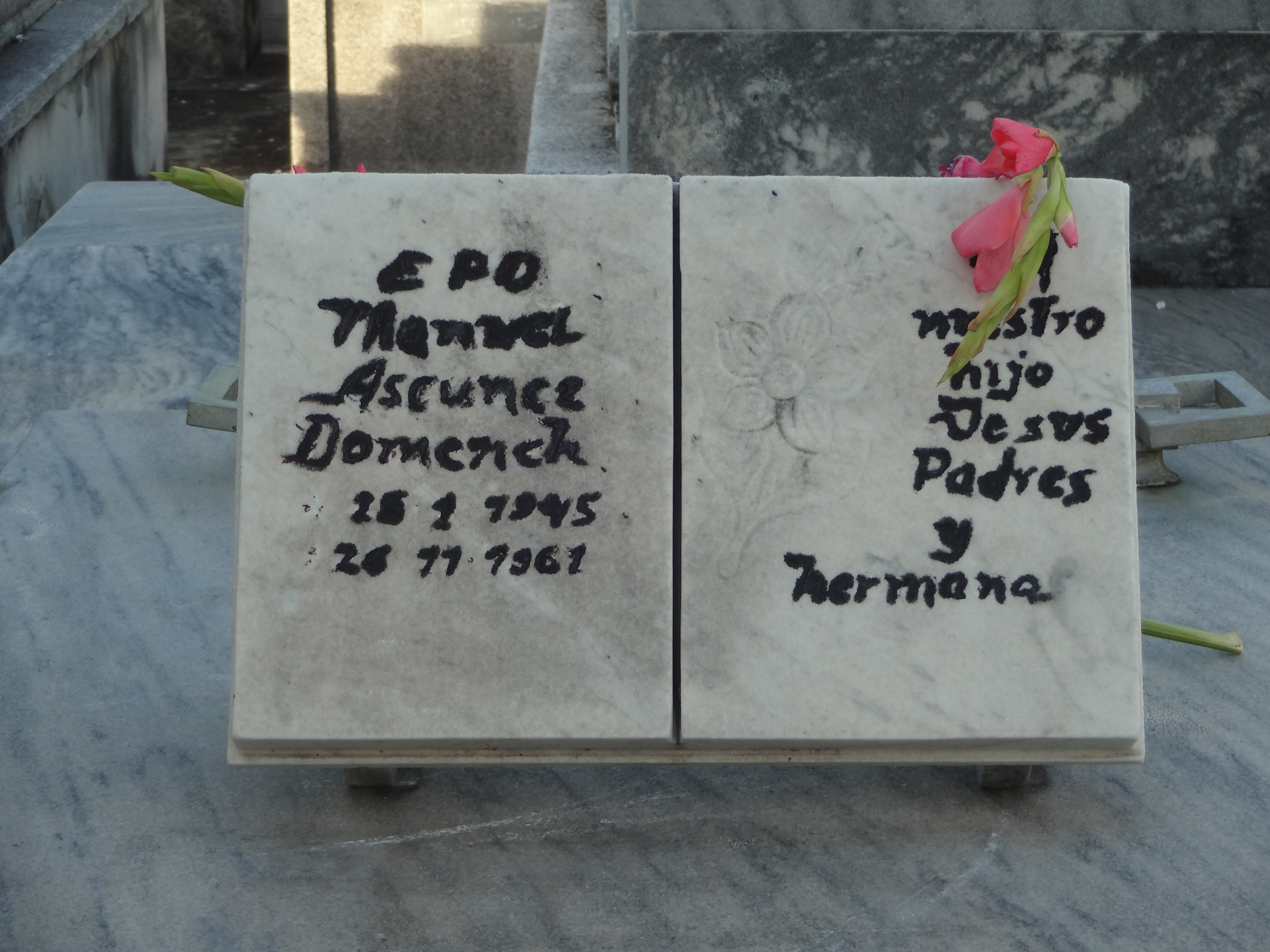
Tomb of Manuel Ascunce Domenech.

Emilio Carretero distinguished himself not only in battles but also for his extreme brutality against civilian communist activists, especially state security informants from the G-2. On 26 November 1961, in the village of Limones Cantero, near Trinidad, Carretero's militants killed Manuel Ascunce Domenech and Pedro Lantigua. On 2 July 1962, José Pío Romero, a peasant militiaman affiliated with the G-2, was murdered. Carretero had sworn to take revenge on him since the first purge. Along with Romero, members of his family were killed, and a note was left: "These were caught by the wheel of the cart." Several of these incidents significantly worsened the local residents' attitude toward Carretero.

=== Commander in Chief ===
On 28 February 1963, Tomás San Gil was killed in battle. Emilio Carretero assumed command of the ELN. His task was no longer to launch an offensive or maintain a bridgehead (as under Duque, Osvaldo Ramírez García, and San Gil), but to preserve the rebel forces for the future, until the circumstances changed favorably. However, under his command, the ELN fought many battles.

In 1964, the authorities attributed 27 military deaths and 116 acts of sabotage to Carretero. Zoila Águila Almeida, her husband Manuel La Guardia, Porfirio Guillén, and his brother Pedro Guillén were active during this time. Carretero's deputy and chief of staff was José León Jiménez. Maro Borges' group operated autonomously.

From a military standpoint, the situation of the rebels at the beginning of 1964 seemed almost desperate. This was due to the overwhelming superiority of government forces in terms of numbers and weaponry, as well as the strict state administrative control. Emilio Carretero was inclined to sail to Florida to establish a rebel base and organize regular military raids from the United States. However, this plan was known to the State Security organs, specifically the Office of the Fight Against Bandits (LCB), headed by Luis Felipe Denis.

== Capture and execution ==
The G-2/LCB agent Alberto Delgado lured Maro Borges to the American yacht, and on 9 March 1964, Emilio Carretero and a group of associates. They were arrested and transferred to Havana. On 22 June 1964 (according to other sources, 14 July), twelve rebels were executed by firing squad at the Fortress of San Carlos de La Cabaña, including Julio Emilio Carretero, Maro Borges, and Manuel La Guardia. Before the execution, they sang "La Bayamesa." Zoila Águila Almeida, captured along with Carretero and La Guardia, was imprisoned for about seventeen years. The last commander-in-chief of the ELN after Carretero's capture was José León Jiménez. His first action was to denounce and execute Agent Delgado.

== Legacy ==
Contemporary attitudes toward Julio Emilio Carretero depend on political orientation. Cuban officials describe him as a brutal counter-revolutionary bandit; Cuban dissidents consider him a freedom fighter against the communist dictatorship. Carretero was married; his daughter, Caridad Carretero Castillo, is a prominent figure in the Cuban opposition. His personality traits were marked by conservative meticulousness, tenacity, desperate courage, and severity to the point of cruelty. A distinctive feature of Emilio Carretero was his thick beard, which was unusual among anti-Castro rebels.

== See also ==
- Escambray rebellion
- Osvaldo Ramírez García
- Tomás San Gil
