= Tomás San Gil =

Cuban anti-communist rebel (1939–1963)

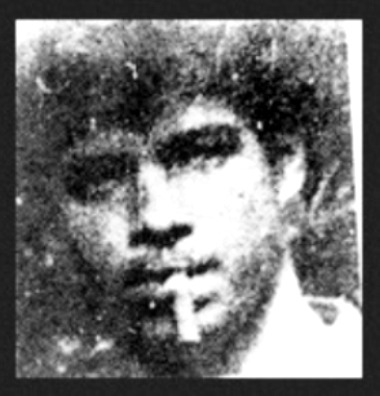
- Born: Tomás David Pérez Díaz; 29 December 1939; Trinidad, Cuba
- Died: 28 February 1963 (aged 23); Escambray, Cuba
- Cause of death: Killed in action
- Other names: Tomasito; The Strongarm of Escambray
- Occupations: Empresario, rancher, anti-communist rebel leader
- Parent: Benilde Díaz de San Gil

Tomás David Pérez Díaz (29 December 1939 – 28 February 1963), alias Tomás San Gil, was a Cuban anti-communist rebel and one of the leaders of the Escambray rebellion. After the death of Osvaldo Ramírez García, he took command of the rebel forces. He was killed in battle with government forces.

== Early life ==
Born into a family of Creole agrarian bourgeoisie in Trinidad, Cuba, he studied at the Catholic school Sancti Spiritus. He was involved in commercial business and later became the manager of his uncle's estate, the landowner Rómulo Díaz, who was a representative of the agricultural company Ponciano Land Company. According to official Cuban sources, Tomás David Pérez Díaz was the type of “dandy on horseback, wearing a black hat and sunglasses.” On the other hand, anti-communist Cuban sources describe him as a “brave and talented” Cuban patriot. Tomás David Pérez strongly disliked the rise to power of Fidel Castro and his communist agenda. He especially rejected the new government's agrarian policies.

He took up arms after a heated argument with an official from the INRA about whether his pastures belonged to the people or to San Gil, who paid for them. "I’m going to the mountains," said San Gil. – "Come and find me. I’ll be waiting."

In September 1960, he joined the anti-communist rebel resistance in the mountains of Escambray. He joined the group of Osvaldo Ramírez García, who, shortly before, as a government official, had opposed the confiscation of Rómulo Díaz’s lands. He adopted the party nickname of Tomás (Tomasito) San Gil, which later became his personal name.

== Rebel commander ==
Tomás San Gil quickly joined Osvaldo Ramírez García’s team. Coming from a landowner elite did not hinder his integration into the predominantly peasant environment of the rebels. He demonstrated military tactical skills and became the head of the party’s headquarters, the "right hand" of Ramírez. He was known for his fiercely anti-communist beliefs, desperate courage, determination, and cruelty. He planned military operations and personally participated in them. At the same time, according to Cuban propaganda, San Gil was involved not only in battles with government troops and the National Revolutionary Militias, attacks on state facilities and administrative companies, but also in robberies, attacks on passenger transport, and the murders of communist activists, including a young black teacher, Conrado Benítez. In a meeting of rebel commanders from 15 to 16 July 1961 in the village of Zicatero, the National Liberation Army (ELN), the Cuban Anti-communist Army, was established. Ramírez appointed San Gil as commander of the rebel forces in several areas of the Escambray (San Ambrosio, Las Tinajitas, Paso Hondo, Las Aromas, and Velázquez).

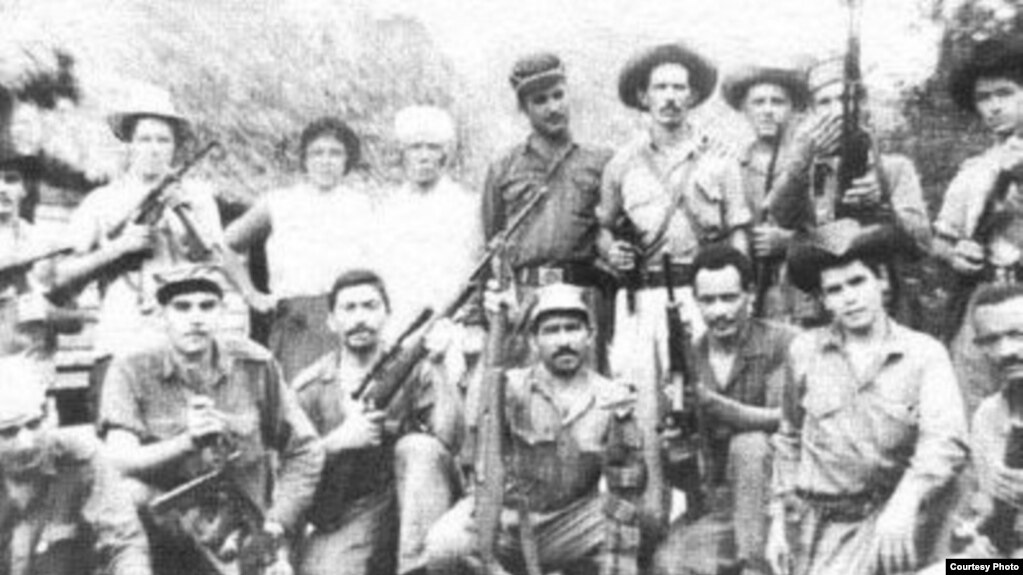
Meeting of the commanders of the Escambray rebellion. Among them were Osvaldo Ramírez García, Evelio Duque, "El Congo" Pacheco, Tomás San Gil, and Julio Emilio Carretero. The lady is Benilde Díaz, the mother of Tomás San Gil.

On 16 April 1962, Osvaldo Ramírez García was killed in battle with government forces. Tomás San Gil succeeded him as commander of the rebel forces. On 19 July 1962, the rebel assembly in El Naranjal selected San Gil as commander of the National Liberation Army. The group under his direct command remained small in number (from a dozen to three dozen militants), but it was very active and fierce. Cuban authorities referred to Tomás San Gil, who was 22 to 23 years old, as "the strong arm of the Escambray." In less than a year, 54 government soldiers were killed, and 36 objects were burned by San Gil’s group. The elimination of Tomás San Gil and his squad was prioritized by Cuban security forces. State security agencies made several attempts to organize assassination attempts, but San Gil managed to thwart them, causing losses for the enemy. In January 1963, an attempt to capture him was made, but San Gil managed to evade the pursuit by crossing the Caracusey River.

== Death ==
In February 1963, Tomás San Gil decided to hold another meeting of rebel commanders in El Naranjal. He planned to coordinate a new series of attacks. This information reached the State Security Organs. Agents were sent to the village, and troops were gathered. On the military side, the operation was supervised by Raúl Menéndez Tomassevich, while Emerio Hernández Santander oversaw the state security line, and field command was led by Gustavo Castellón Melián (Caballo Mayaguara). Around a hundred rebels, including San Gil, were under persistent pursuit. Several times, San Gil broke through the encirclement.

On 28 February 1963, a group of around thirty militants led by Tomás San Gil and Nilo Armando Saavedra Gil (an active participant in the Cuban Revolution, an anti-Batista rebel from the Revolutionary Directorate of 13 March Movement) were surrounded by three government battalions on the land of an old estate in the village of Maisinik. The group led by San Gil managed to break through the barrier. Furthermore, San Gil voluntarily returned to the battlefield to help the surrounded Saavedra and was killed in a shootout. The battle ended the following day: 11 rebels and 27 government soldiers were killed. After the death of Tomás San Gil, Julio Emilio Carretero took command of the ELN.

== Personality and family ==
According to accounts from people who knew him, Tomás San Gil was the first to attack and last to retreat. At the same time, he combined courage with an "innate, strategic mind." He was very popular among the rebels (on his 23rd birthday, he was given a birthday cake at his hideout, although this involved many risks). Externally, Tomás San Gil is described as a short young man, but with great physical strength. He was not married, but his mother, Doña Benilde Díaz, and his sister, Conchita, actively participated in the rebellion. These women organized material supplies and informed the group about the situation outside the combat zone. Both were arrested and mistreated numerous times and interrogated relentlessly. Contemporary attitudes towards Tomás San Gil, like those towards Osvaldo Ramírez García, depend on ideology and political orientation. Cuban officials characterize him as a bandit and counterrevolutionary; Cuban dissidents, as heroes of the struggle for liberation.

== See also ==
- Osvaldo Ramírez García
- José León Jiménez
