= University Militias =

University Militias were military units for training university students in some Southern European and Latin American countries.

== Cuba ==
A University Militia known as the José Antonio Echeverría Brigade was formed in 1959, which later became the 154th Battalion of the National Revolutionary Militias. The unit is now known as the 154th Regiment of the Territorial Troops Militias.

== Italy ==
The University Militia was a branch of the Voluntary Militia for National Security, and had the same missions and functions.

=== History ===
The first groups were formed in 1925, and in 1929 they were united and placed under the control of an Inspectorate General based in Rome. By September 1931, it was a separate organization composed of five legions.

In cities where universities were located, the existing departments were considered autonomous, and according to their size they were formed into cohorts or centuries. It was then reorganized into nine legions, fourteen autonomous cohorts, and two autonomous legions in Italian Libya and Italian East Africa.

=== Composition ===
The personnel was recruited entirely from university students, who were grouped into departments based on their faculty. The officers were selected from students who had previously served as officers in the Royal Army.

An agreement between the Ministry of War, the Ministry of National Education, and General Headquarters enabled students to complete their military service through the Cadet Course of the University Militia: For two academic years they received special instruction, and during the summer break they trained at the reserve officer school of the Royal Army. Students who were judged as suitable were promoted to the rank of second lieutenant and received their first assignment in the corps.

=== Uniform ===
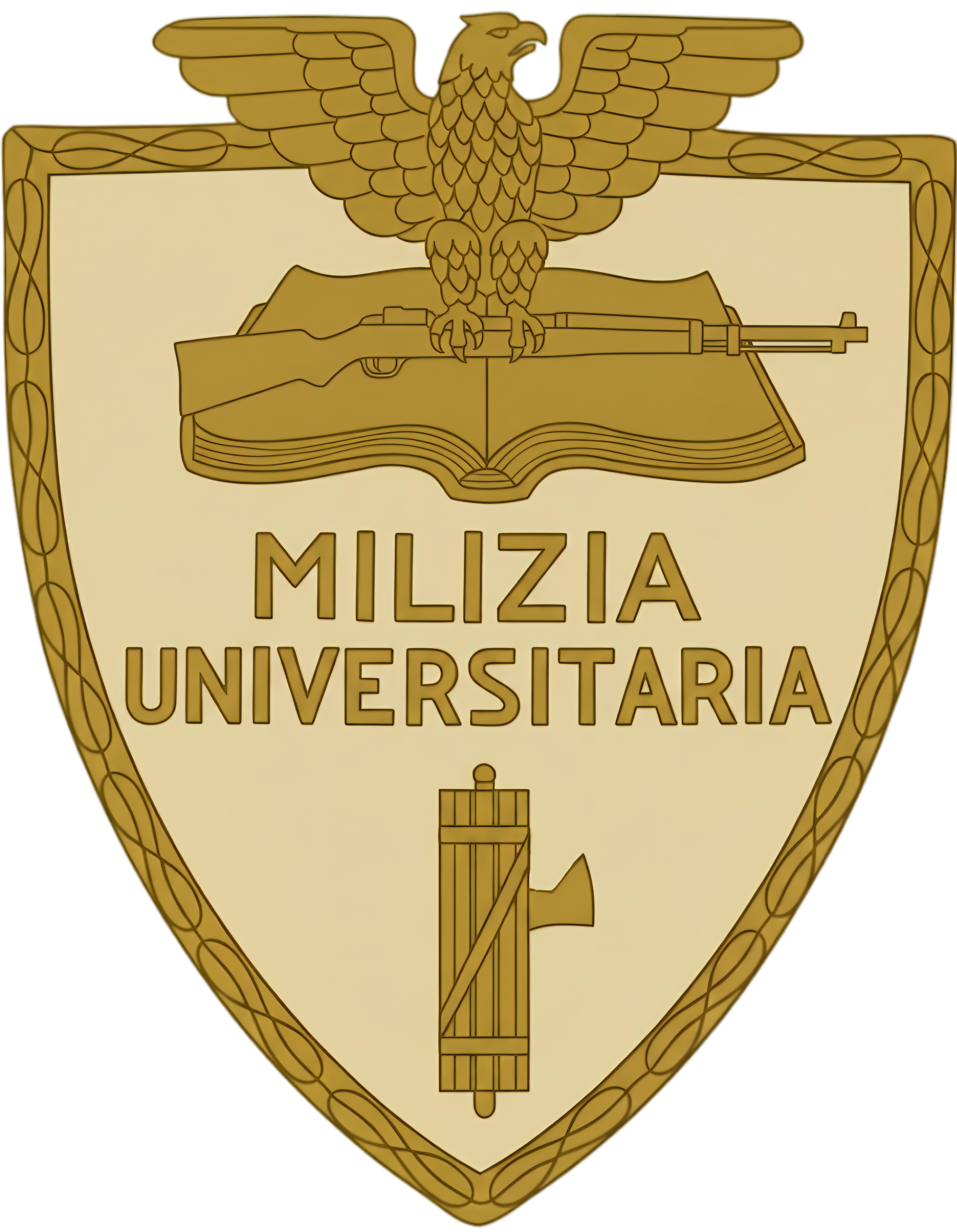

The national personnel of the University Militia wore the gray-green uniform of the MVSN. They were distinguished by their alpine hat that had a black band and black piping, but without a side emblem or feather, and by the use of black thread for the double-flame gorget patches, ornaments and epaulets. As for the rest of the MVSN, the fasces replaced the usual star of the Royal Armed Forces on the shoulder boards.

The special badge and insignia consisted of an eagle with its wings outstretched and holding a carbine in its talons over an open book.

=== Order of battle ===
- Inspectorate General (Rome)
- First University Legion "Prince of Piedmont" (Turin)
- Second University Legion "Arnaldo Mussolini" (Milan)
- Third University Legion "Dante Alighieri" (Florence)
- Fourth University Legion "Benito Mussolini" (Rome)
- Fifth University Legion "Goffredo Mameli" (Naples)
- Sixth University Legion "San Giorgio" (Genoa)
- Seventh University Legion "Guglielmo Marconi" (Bologna)
- Eighth University Legion "Emilio Ingravalle" (Bari)
- Ninth University Legion "Michele Marrone" (Palermo)
- Autonomous University Cohort (Pavia)
- Autonomous University Cohort (Padua)
- Autonomous University Cohort (Venice)
- Autonomous University Cohort (Trieste)
- Autonomous University Cohort (Parma)
- Autonomous University Cohort (Ferrara)
- Autonomous University Cohort "Ciro Menotti" (Modena)
- Autonomous University Cohort (Pisa)
- Autonomous University Cohort (Siena)
- Autonomous University Cohort (Urbino)
- Autonomous University Cohort (Macerata)
- Autonomous University Cohort (Perugia)
- Autonomous University Cohort (Camerino)
- Autonomous University Cohort (Messina)
- Autonomous University Cohort (Catania)
- Autonomous University Cohort (Cagliari)
- Autonomous University Cohort (Sassari)
- Autonomous University Centuria (Tripoli)
- Autonomous University Centuria (Addis Ababa)

== Spain ==
The University Militias, IMEC, was a method to fulfill compulsory military service in Spain. In it, militiamen underwent military training in the Reserves until the drill of the militia was professional.

It consisted of university-level students completing compulsory military service as officers (second lieutenant) or non-commissioned officers (sergeant) of the reserves, receiving military training in three periods (six months in the first year, three months the two following years).

Its original name, from 1942 through 1972, was IPS (Instrucción Premilitar Superior); from the latter year until 1991, IMEC (Instrucción Militar Escala Complemento) and until its dissolution in 2001, SEFOCUMA (Servicio Formación Cuadros Mando).

=== Description ===
To be able to apply for training and to become an officer or non-commissioned officer on the reserve list the first two years of university courses that were attended had to be passed and medical, physical, and psychotechnical tests commensurate with the rank had to be passed.

It existed independently for each of the three services: Spanish Army (IMECET), Spanish Navy (IMECAR), and Spanish Air Force (IMECEA).

=== History ===
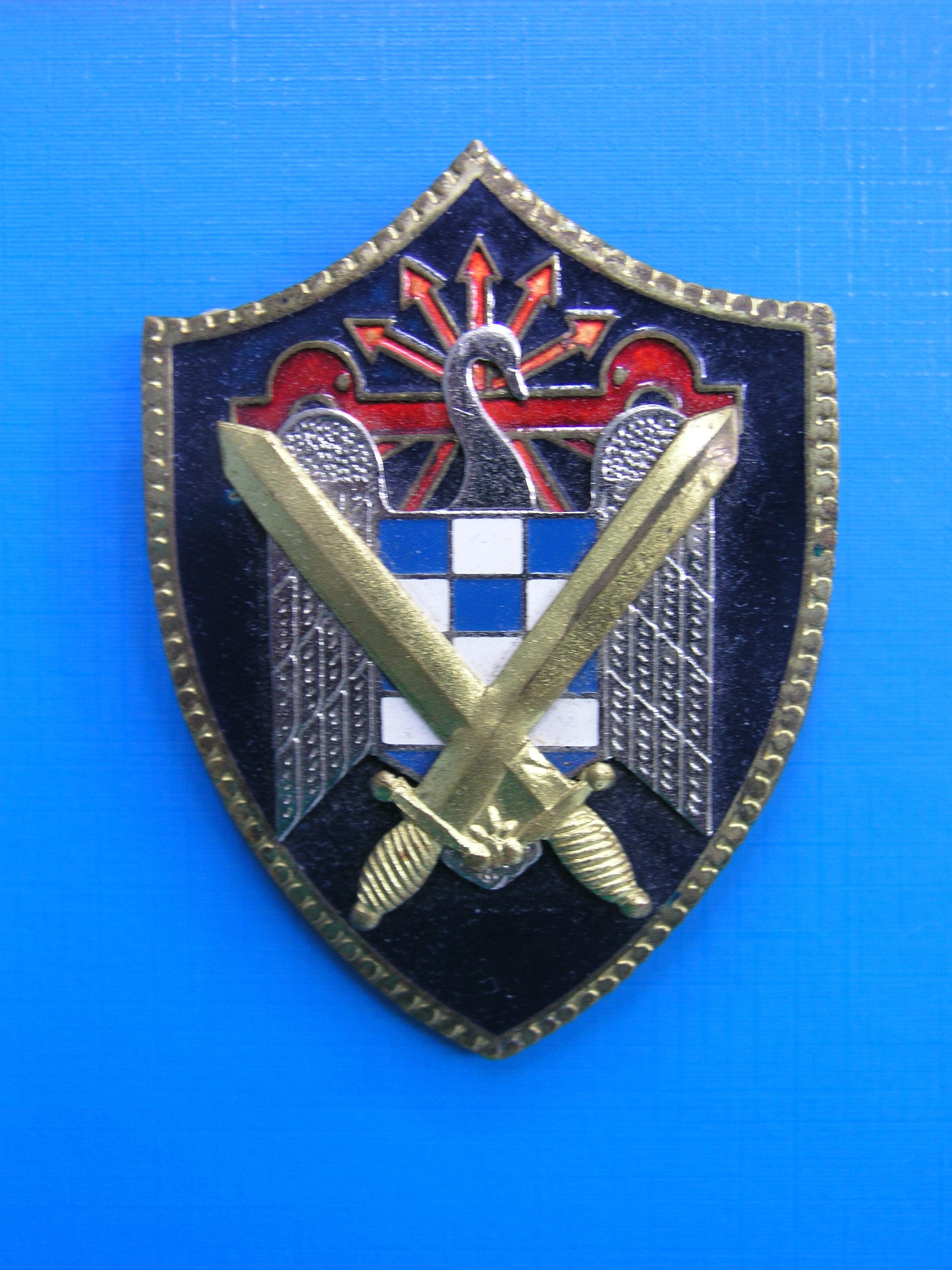
Spanish Army University Militias badge (1945–1976)

According to José Ignacio Ripol de Churruca, a Spanish reserve marine infantry lieutenant, University Militias were created as a result of the outbreak of the War of Independence, and the consequent large number of casualties sustained among ensigns and lieutenants of the officer corps of the regular army. The far-seeing person who saw the way to fill in these gaps, was Gil de Bernabé, Colonel of Artillery and Director of the Academy of Segovia. The quarry which Gil de Bernabé used to fill these gaps among the cadre of professionals was the university students, whose intellectual training made them suitable to be assimilated quickly and, after an accelerated course, for the duties of an officer in combat.

The Colonel depended on three sources. First, the students of the University of Toledo who facing the imminent danger of the city falling into the hands of the French left on foot, with their professors at the lead, leaving for Segovia, a city still not occupied, where it positioned itself and named itself the Literary Battalion. Second, the Maestrantes de Ronda, good horsemen skilled in the use of the sword, and lastly, the cadets of Segovia who followed their Colonel and who it is certain, by his training, found themselves quickly taken on by the Army of the South.

Gil de Bernabé with the force of this human capital presented to the Defense Board in Cádiz a project whose most outstanding paragraph is that which reads: "Utilize as a quarry the 15,000 bachelor, licentiate, and doctoral students and even professors to be able to produce 8,000 subaltern officers, if chiefs and even generals are not included."

The Navy offered the installations of its Naval Academy in San Fernando to form that which was called the "National and Patriotic Military Academy". In it were trained infantry, cavalry, artillery and engineer officers.

Once the siege of Cádiz was raised the Academy languished. As it has been said before nobody remembers when Santa Bárbara ceased to thunder. It remained definitely closed in Granada, where it moved to, in 1823.

From this date nobody could remember the subject anymore until the Royal Order of 29 July 1918 created the figure of the reserve officer, because of the excellent results that civilian graduates had given in the belligerent armies during World War I (1914-1918). The majority of Spaniards who adopted this system to do compulsory military service and to take the commission of ensign, had the privilege of choosing Branch and Regiment and also the city, which would be his residence.

During the Spanish Civil War, academies were created on both sides to train ensigns, who in the Nationalist zone, received provisional grades, at its conclusion at the end of the struggle both lost their status. The star was not sewn on the cuff, but upon the black taffeta which was worn on the left side of the jacket and over the heart.

In 1940 the creation of the University Militias was promulgated, by law, entry into which was open to: "All students over 18 years old who attend courses in the different faculties, Technical Schools and any other teaching institution which confers degrees of duly recognized superior character." The first class of the army graduated in 1942, that of the Navy in 1944 and that of the Air Force in 1948. In 1972 this service suffered a restructuring initiating the Military Instruction for the training of the Reserve List period and much more recently the latest reform came under the name Command Cadre Training Service where a few, previously chosen for their academic record, had the privilege to become ensigns in these Arms for them to prove by their studies a better aptitude and found themselves accommodated in the assigned quotas to be able to serve the Army, Navy or Air Force.

From 1992 Spain belonged to the Interallied Confederation of Reserve Officers and the Interallied Confederation of Medical Reserve Officers. They meet twice a year, first, in Brussels during winter and then in rotating turns among member nations. In 2001 they met in Spain: Madrid and Toledo. In the former the work sessions took place in the Center for Advanced National Defense Studies and in the latter the new classes participated in military competitions at the Infantry Academy. In total 1,114 delegates came among them Generals, Chiefs and Officers of thirty European and American Nations.

The emergence of the professional armies erased with a bureaucratic stroke of the pen all possibility of serving the country in double capacity civilian and military, becoming double citizens—twice a citizen—as Winston Churchill called them.

The law which stopped the promulgation and which regulated the future forces of the Reserves, did not give the opportunity to be able, like in other nations of the Western World, to be an Officer, working as a civilian, being able to be promoted in his military role, by means of courses or trainings, which the State gave as an incentive for businesses to be able to dispense with their co-workers for short periods of time, during which the said could dedicate themselves to their second occupation.

Although Spaniards trace the beginnings of University Militias to the early nineteenth century, in 1762 in the Philippines, at that time a Spanish colony, four companies were raised from volunteer students of the University of Santo Tomás, a colonial college, to fight the British invasion of the colonial capital Manila. These military units were organized again in 1780 as militia companies, which were part of the Spanish colonial army and which existed until 1785.

== Venezuela ==
Originally known as the University Military Reserve of the Bolivarian University of Venezuela, it was renamed Bolivarian University Militias.

== In popular culture ==
- 15 bajo la lona is a 1959 comedy about fifteen college students in a Spanish reserve military training program.

== See also ==
- Academic battalion
