= Conscription in Spain =

Conscription in Spain, colloquially known as the mili in Spanish, began in the late 18th and 19th centuries and ended in December 2001.

== History ==
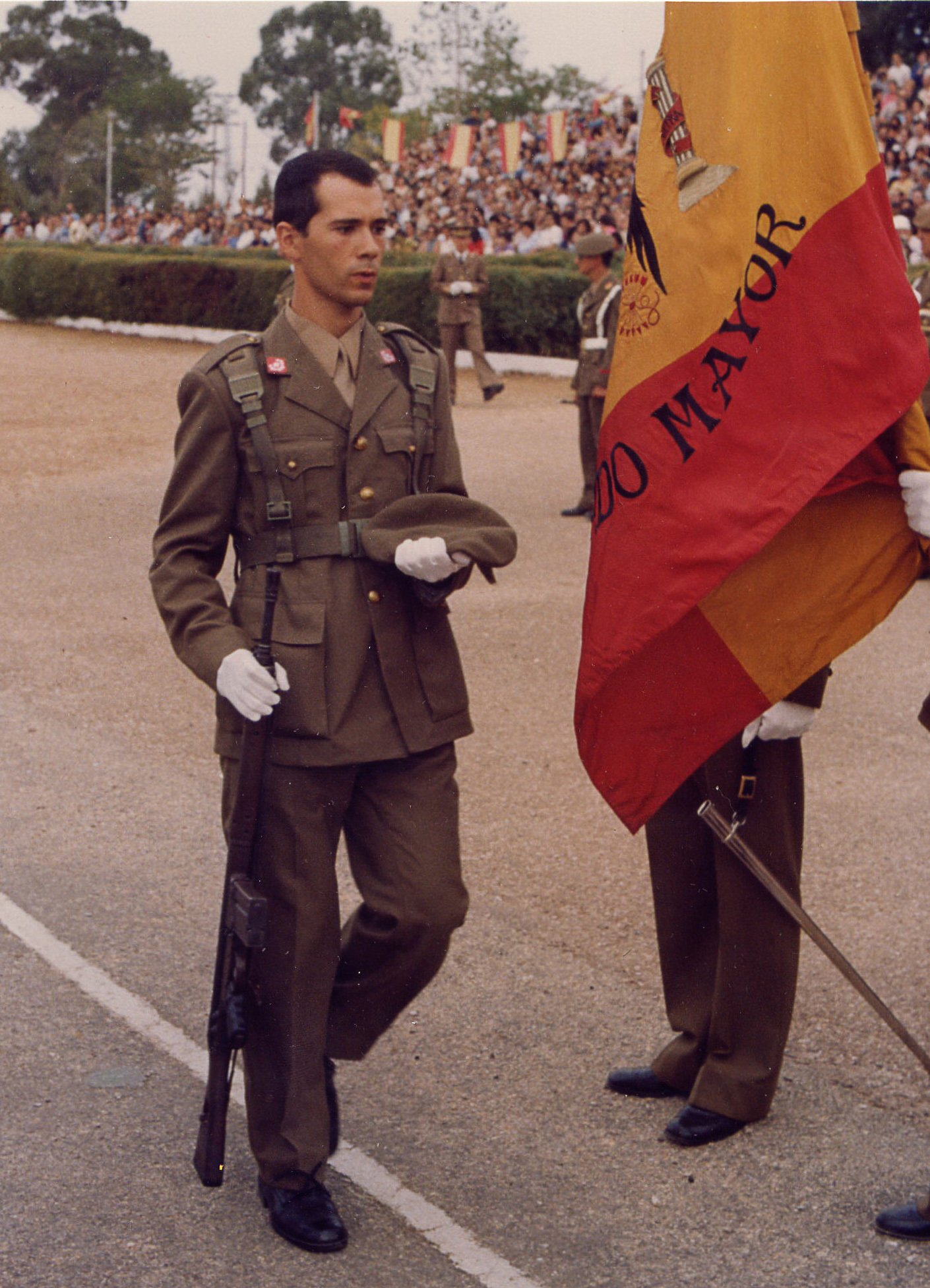
Flag swearing-in ceremony during military service in Cáceres, in 1980.

In the 18th century, with the arrival of the Bourbons in Spain and the need for soldiers for the army, in the context of the War of the Spanish Succession (1701–1715), the foundations of military recruitment were laid in Spain. After the end of the war, the lack of troops became constant, so it was decided to progressively implement compulsory recruitment methods, which were very unpopular, alternating them with levies of vagrants and thugs, which were not very effective and were eventually rejected. Provincial militias acquired a forced character. Recruitment, which had been used until then in a very limited way, became more important given the need for a permanent army.

=== 19th century ===
The ordinance of October 27, 1800, consolidated compulsory conscription as a contribution to which the male population was subjected and established the hegemony of the soldier of Quintos as the basis for the replacement of the Spanish Army. The system was characterized by the existence of a large number of exemptions to the service, which prevented us from speaking of legal equality in the obligations of citizens, typical of liberalism.

In 1837, the Ordinance of Replacements approved that year abolished the exemptions that had existed up to that date, which included the privileged orders, the liberal professions, part of the peasantry, and artisans. These subjective exemptions for belonging to certain groups were replaced by others of a more objective nature, such as cash payment (redención en metálico in Spanish) and the power to appoint substitutes, by which, in short, by paying an amount of money, it was possible to avoid compulsory military service and which led to a high level of conflict in Spanish society at the end of the 19th century and the beginning of the 20th century. The generalization of military service was not complete from the territorial point of view either, since in Navarre, Catalonia, and the Basque Country conscription was voluntary until 1833, 1845, and 1876 respectively.

=== Legislation ===
- Ordinance of 1800, based on that of 1770
- Constitution of 1812
- Royal Cell of 1817 and Royal Instruction of 1819
- Army Replacement Act of November 2, 1837
- Bill of 1850
- Replacement Act of January 30, 1856
- Replacement Act of January 10, 1877
- Army Conscription and Replacement Act of August 28, 1878
- Conscription Act of 1882
- Replacement and Conscription Act of 1885
- Law of 1896.

=== 20th century ===
The reform approved by the liberal government of José Canalejas in 1912, using the Army Conscription and Replacement Law, introduced the term "compulsory military service" and eliminated the figures of "cash payment" and substitution which had been the formulas to legally avoid it, through the payment of a certain amount of money and which had been the object of strong social criticism. The need to maintain the economic resources provided by these figures up to that time led to the establishment of the new formula of the quota soldier (Soldado de cuota in Spanish), which, although not exempt from service, drastically reduced the time of service in exchange for the payment of money.

==== Francoism ====
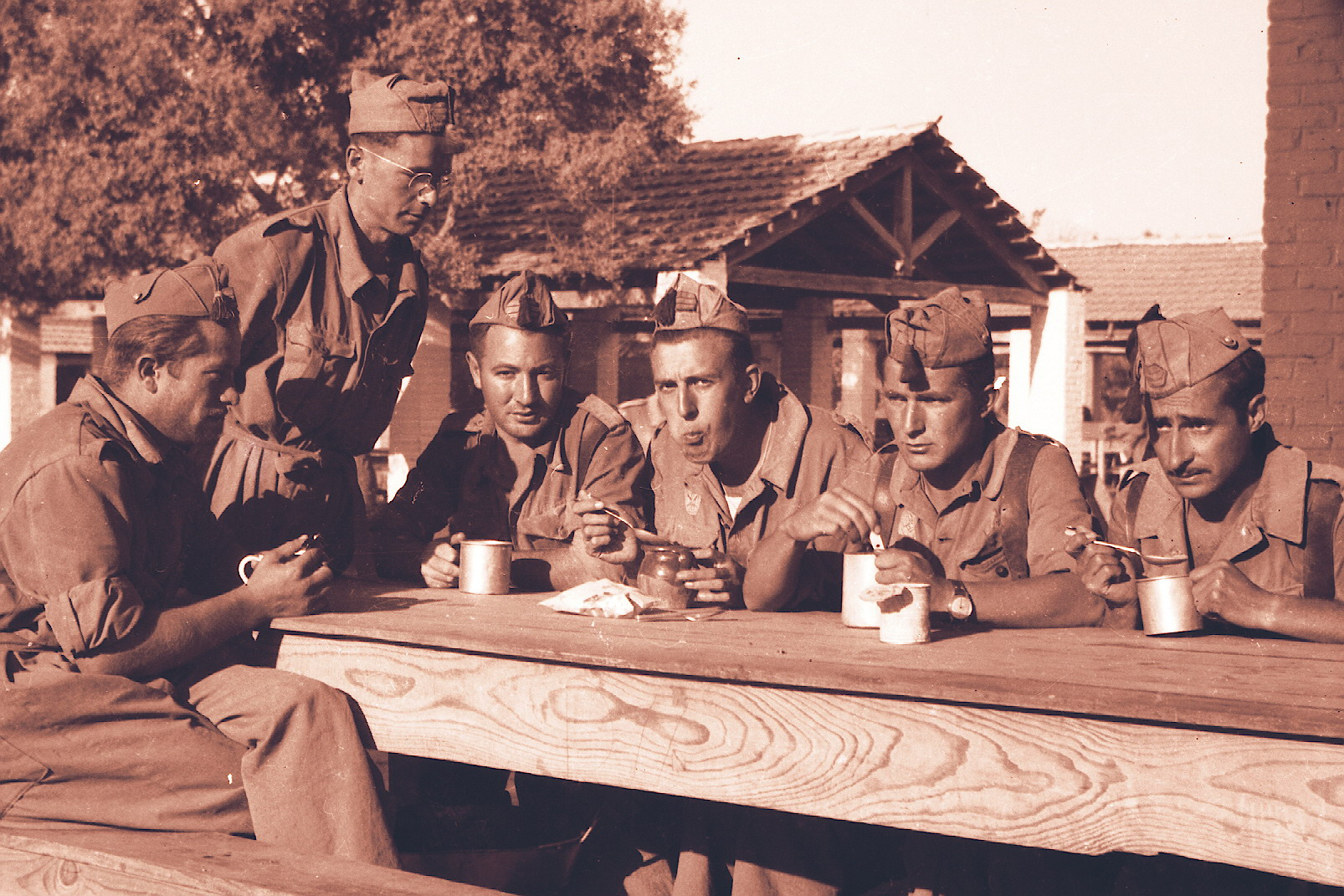
Spanish soldiers during their military service in the 1940s.

In 1940, just after the end of the Spanish Civil War, Francisco Franco issued the Army Conscription and Replacement Law, which modified the legislation on conscription and established, among other changes, the duration of compulsory military service, known as service in the ranks, at two years. This regulation also prohibited marriage from entry into the ranks until transfer to reserve status. It also established a reduction in the time of service in the ranks, according to the classification of men as follows: without pre-military instruction, who would serve for two years, although after 18 months they could enjoy temporary or unlimited leaves of absence whenever the convenience and needs of the service allowed it; with elementary pre-military instruction, who would remain in the ranks for 18 months, which could be reduced to 12 months; and those who studied at universities, technical schools and other official centers of higher education, who would remain in the ranks for 12 months, distributed in periods to be determined in due course. In 1943, it was made compulsory for all men to have completed their military service to be employed in any area of the State.

The Lex fori of the Spanish people (Fuero de los Españoles in Spanish) approved in 1945 and which constituted one of the Fundamental Laws of the Franco regime, included, in its article 7, about military service: "It is a title of honor for Spaniards to serve in the armed forces of their country. All Spaniards are obliged to this service when they are called to it according to law."

In 1968, the General Law of Military Service was approved, which also established in its first article that: "Military Service is an honor and an inexcusable duty that reaches all male Spaniards...". This law marked the division between a compulsory military service that had a duration between 15 and 18 months (navy) and a voluntary one that had the advantage of allowing one to choose the military region where the service was carried out, but in exchange was longer with a duration between 15 and 24 months.

The State involved the companies in the control of the fulfillment of the military service, so all employers had to check, before admitting personnel to their service, if they complied with their military obligations, incurring responsibilities in case of non-compliance.

==== Democracy ====
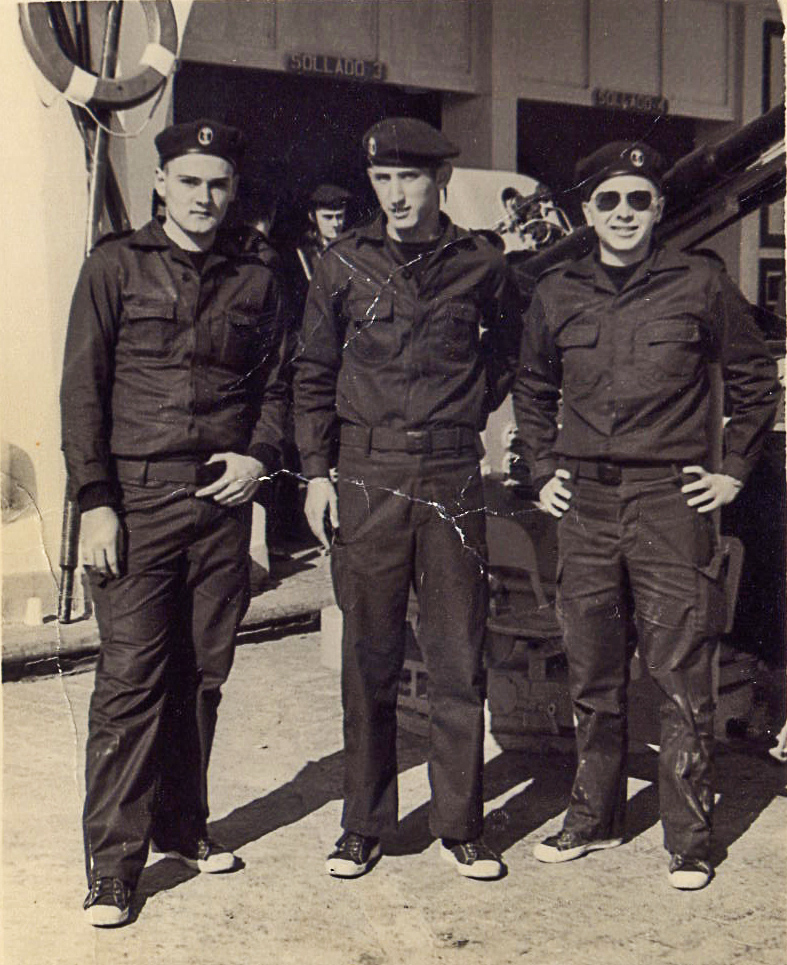
Recruits at the San Fernando Marine Barracks in 1978.

In 1991, in the context of the professionalization of the armed forces, the Organic Law on Military Service shortened the duration of service to nine months, while providing that replacement soldiers would preferably perform activities in those units whose operational level, reaction capacity, or scope of action were in line with the training acquired during military service, and reserved tasks characterized by greater complexity, responsibility or experience for professional soldiers.

==== Conscientious objection ====
Military service was rejected by an important part of society. Some of the citizens called to military service declared themselves conscientious objectors and refused to perform it, despite the existence of prison sentences for doing so. To regulate this situation, the conscientious objection law was passed in 1984. This law provided for the development of a substitute social benefit for conscientious objectors. This substitute service was regulated by a regulation published in 1988, which established a duration of between 18 and 24 months, longer than military service, the duration of which was then set at 12 months. This benefit began to operate in 1988 and was compulsory for the 24,000 objectors registered at the time. These objectors were more concentrated in the Basque Country and Catalonia than in other parts of Spain.

The substitute social benefit was managed by the Ministry of Justice through the Office for the Social Benefit of Conscientious Objectors. For its development, this office processed agreements with different organizations such as Civil Protection or Red Cross, in which the objectors, also called "social collaborators", provided their services. However, their functions in these organizations could not replace those of regular employees. Once the service was completed, the social collaborators were placed in the reserve.

==== Completion ====
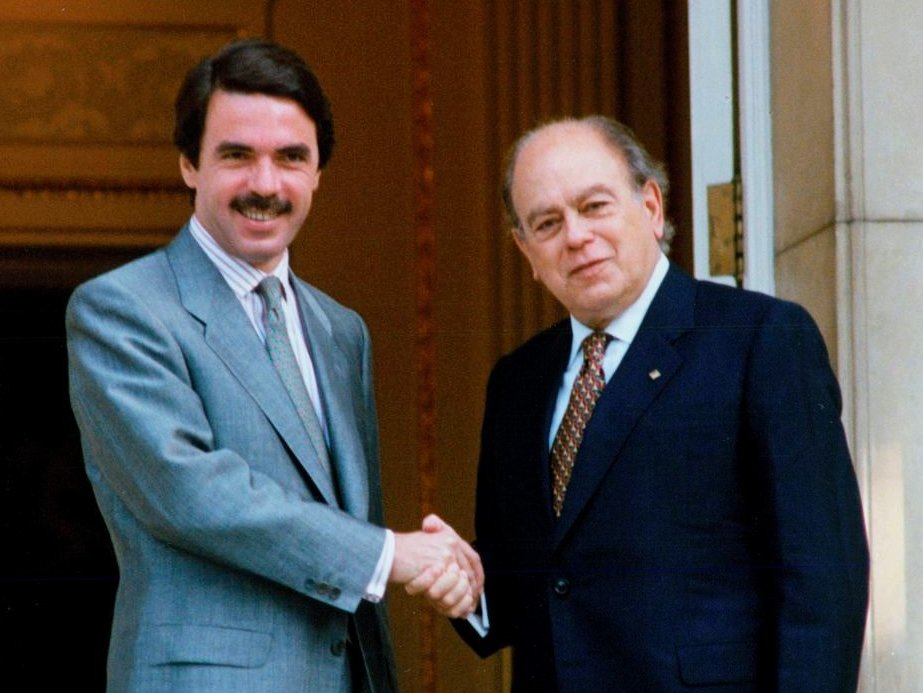
Aznar and Pujol

The end of compulsory military service was one of the points included in the 1996 Hotel Majestic Agreement between José María Aznar and the president of the Generalitat Jordi Pujol, in exchange for the support of CiU in the investiture of the leader of the Popular Party after the elections of that year. Although its elimination was originally scheduled for December 31, 2002, José María Aznar announced a few days before the general elections in 2000 that it would be brought forward to 2001, despite the dissenting opinion of Defense Minister Eduardo Serra. Compulsory military service was suspended by Law 17/1999 on the Armed Forces Personnel Regime and Royal Decree 247/2001 brought forward the suspension to December 31, 2001.

== Provision of the service ==
The recruits joining the military service first underwent a period of military instruction in the training camp of their unit of assignment, in an isolated environment, where soldiers were trained in theory and practice and where they were prepared for weeks for the flag-swearing parade and where the commanders took great care to ensure that the order of the parade was perfect.

From 1966 onwards, the so-called "Recruit Training Centers" were created, which were macro-barracks specialized in training recruits. This first phase culminated with the so-called pledge of allegiance, after which the soldiers were incorporated into their definitive destinations, where they had plenty of free time.

== Impact of military service on Spanish culture ==
Military service has been widely reflected in Spanish literature and cinema. During Franco's regime, propagandistic cinema dominated about the fulfillment of the service, in the form of comedy, which recurrently reflected it as an initiatory rite of passage, in which the recruits, in many occasions coming from a remote place in the interior of Spain, went to the big city to serve the homeland and become a man. Emphasis was placed on the spirit of comradeship and camaraderie of the rest of the recruits, which helped to overcome the innocence and inexperience of the protagonists. Examples of this cinema are:

- Recluta con niño (1956), black and white film comedy, directed by Pedro Luis Ramírez and starring José Luis Ozores.
- ¡Ahí va otro recluta! (1960), a film directed by Ramón Fernández.
- Cateto a babor, film (1970). Comedy directed by Ramón Fernández and starring Alfredo Landa. It is a remake of Recluta con niño.

After Franco's death, the vision of military service changed to a more critical and satirical view, highlighting many of the problems derived from its fulfillment. Outstanding examples of this vision are:

- Historias de la puta mili, a comic series created by the cartoonist Ivà for the magazine El Jueves in 1986, told, satirically, the experiences of some soldiers during their military service.
  - Historias de la puta mili (film), film adaptation of Ivá's comics.
  - Historias de la puta mili (TV series), a TV adaptation of Ivá's comic books.
- Soldadito español (1986), is a film that portrays for the first time the phenomenon of insubordination in Spain.
- Morirás en Chafarinas (novel), a novel of intrigue written in 1990 by Fernando Lalana. It deals with one of the main social concerns related to military service in the late 70s of the 20th century, the suicide of recruits and their initiation into drug use during their time in the ranks.
  - Morirás en Chafarinas (film) (1995), film by Pedro Olea, adapted from the novel by Fernando Lalana.
- Miel de naranjas (2012), film by director Imanol Uribe.
- Ardor Guerrero (1995), is a story by the writer Antonio Muñoz Molina, in which he recalls his military service in the city of Vitoria in 1979, in the midst of the Spanish transition and in which many of the details and rituals of life of the recruits are described.

== See also ==
- University Militias
- Insubordinate movement in Spain
- Conscientious objection to military service
- Juan Carlos I of Spain
- Conscription
- Spanish Army
