= Manuel Ascunce Domenech =

Cuban teacher (1945–1961)

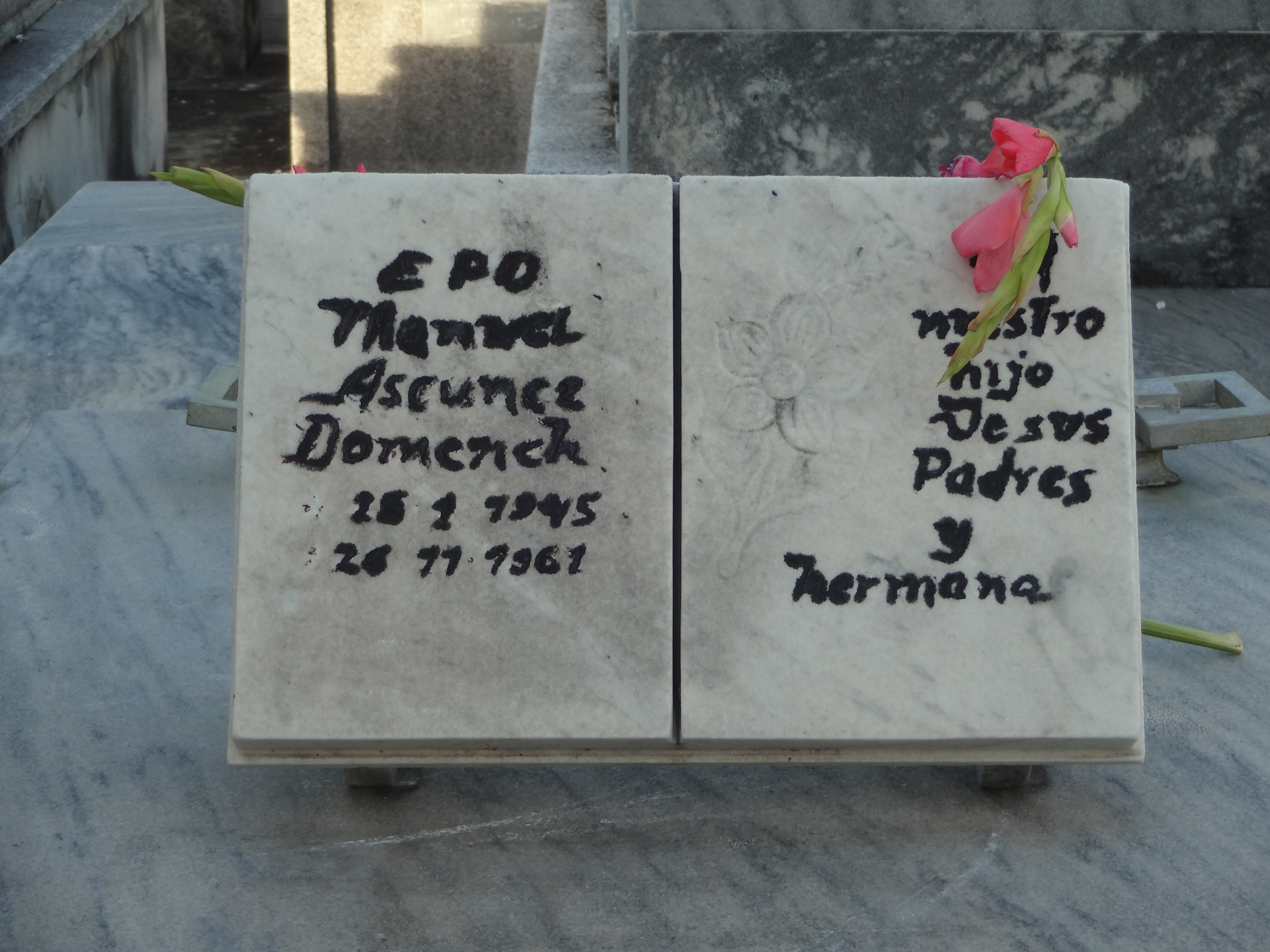
- Tomb of Ascunce at Cementerio Cristóbal Colón
- Born: January 25, 1945; Sagua la Grande, Las Villas Province, Cuba
- Died: November 26, 1961 (aged 16); Limones Cantero, Sancti Spíritus, Cuba
- Cause of death: Murder
- Monuments: Manuel Ascunce Domenech Monument in Sancti Spiritus
- Occupation: Educator
- Years active: 1959–1961
- Organization: Government of Cuba
- Known for: Murder during literacy program

Manuel Ascunce Domenech (January 25, 1945 – November 26, 1961) was a Cuban teacher who participated in the Cuban Literacy Campaign of 1961.

== Biography ==
Born in Sagua la Grande to Manuel Ascunce Hernandez and Evelia Domenech Sacerio, Ascunce grew up with his family in Havana, where he attended primary and secondary school in the Luyanó neighborhood. In the early 1960s, he joined the Asociación de Jóvenes Rebeldes, formed after the Cuban Revolution, later joining as a brigade member for the National Literacy Campaign of Cuba, specifically to the "Conrado Benítez" brigade.

In his brief career as a literacy educator, he moved to the mountains to teach night classes, while during the day he helped locals in the fields. He was captured and subsequently murdered in 1961 by a group of Cuban counterrevolutionaries under order of Julio Emilio Carretero Escajadillo while staying at the home of his student Pedro Lantigua Ortega, who also was killed. He was 16 years old. In December of that year, he was commemorated by Fidel Castro, along with others who died during the literary campaign. He is buried at the Colon Cemetery in Havana.

== Legacy ==
A monument dedicated to him was erected in Sancti Spiritus.

In 1962, the Manuel Ascunce Hospital was named in his honor, and in 1972, Manuel Ascunce Domenech Pedagogal University was named in his honor as well.
