= Manolo López López =

Cuban anti-communist guerrilla (1943–1962)

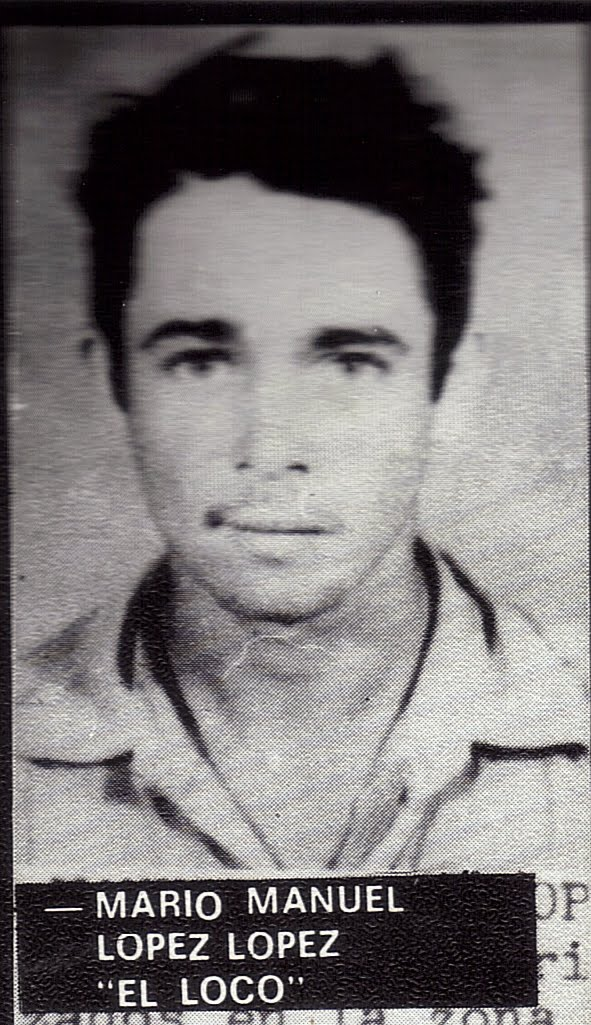
- Born: 1943; Chambas, Camagüey Province, Cuba
- Died: 28 August 1962 (aged 19); Los Barriles, Camagüey Province, Cuba
- Cause of death: Killed in action
- Other names: "Manolito El Loco" "El Loco López"

Manolo Manuel López López (1943 – August 28, 1962), known as Manolito El Loco or El Loco López, was a Cuban anti-communist rebel who participated in the Escambray rebellion against the government of Fidel Castro in northern Camagüey. He was one of the youngest rebel commanders. He was killed in battle with government forces.

== Arrest ==
Manolo Lopez was into a village family in the Chambas region of Camagüey Province, at the age of 16 he was arrested on charges of involvement in the anti-Castro rebel movement. He was sent to Torrance, Havana's juvenile prison to serve his sentence and receive political indoctrination. There he injured himself with a knife in order to get to the hospital. He escaped from the hospital through the window, climbing down the sheets. With almost no resources, he was sought by the police and reached his birthplace.

== Escambray rebellion ==
During adolescence, he developed political views based on an implacable hostility toward Fidel Castro's government and a strong anti-communism. In Camagüey he joined the rebel movement led by Arnoldo Martínez Andrade, a former commander of the revolutionary army who participated in the overthrow of Fulgencio Batista. López participated in many battles with forces and the National Revolutionary Militias, in actions such as the assault on the Perea Mines, the capture of the towns of Río and Centeno and numerous ambushes in the plains of the Province. For his bravery, and bordering on recklessness, he received the nickname El Loco (The Madman).

In early 1962, 18-year-old Manolito Loco López commanded a rebel detachment in northern Camagüey. He was considered one of the most daring partisan commanders. Moreover, his madness was combined with composure and military skills, particularly on June 29, 1962, Loco's militants stopped a bus on the highway, took out two uniformed police passengers, shot them and set the bus on fire.

== Death ==
The army's special anti-bandit unit, Lucha contra bandidos, LCB, under the command of Oscar Figueredo, was sent against Loco's squad. On 10 August he was surrounded in the Los Barriles village, wounded twice, but managed to escape pursuit. On 28 August 1962 he was again surrounded. During the battle, Lopez shot Figueredo and ordered his men to leave. He considered himself dead due to two serious wounds he received in the previous battle. Lopez's command was given to the rebel Floro Camacho Alfaro.

Lopez fired from the embankment with an M1 carbine and an M1911 pistol. After a while he shouted that he was giving up. When the commandos approached him to take him prisoner, Loco opened fire and threw grenades. After that, several bursts of machine gun fire were fired at him. Manolito Loco López, 19, was killed. Floro Camacho Alfaro and the rest of the rebels escaped through the barrier.

== See also ==
- Escambray rebellion
