= Osvaldo Farrés =

Cuban musician (1903–1985)

Osvaldo Farrės
- Born: January 13, 1903; Quemado de Güines, Las Villas, Cuba
- Died: December 22, 1985 (aged 82) West New York, New Jersey, U.S.
- Genres: Bolero
- Occupations: Composer, songwriter

External audio
- You may hear a performance of Osvaldo Farrés bolero "Tres Palabras" by Luis G. Roldan with Alfredo Antonini's CBS Pan American Orchestra and the accordionistok John Serry Sr. in 194? Here

Osvaldo Farrés (Spanish pronunciation: [osˈβaldo faˈres]; January 13, 1903 – December 22, 1985) was a Cuban songwriter and composer best known for having written the popular songs "Quizás, Quizás, Quizás", "Acércate Más", "En El Mar", and "Tres Palabras".

== Early life ==
Farrés was born in 1903 in the small city of Quemado de Güines, Las Villas, Cuba.

== Career ==
Although unable to read or write music, he still became a composer. His songs include "Quizás, Quizás, Quizás", "Acércate Más", "Tres Palabras", "Toda Una Vida" and his own favorite "Madrecita" written in honor of his mother and sung to this day in Latin America on Mother's Day.

His songs have been performed and recorded by stars such as Doris Day, Nat King Cole, Natalie Cole, Eydie Gorme, Pedro Vargas, Raquel Bitton, Charles Aznavour, Luis Miguel, Maurice Chevalier, Sara Montiel, Olga Guillot, John Serry Sr., Cake and many others. Charlie Haden included Tres Palabras on his Grammy-winning 2001 album Nocturne.

== Personal life ==
In 1962, Farrés and his wife, Fina del Peso Farrés, left Cuba and they never returned. He died in West New York, New Jersey, in 1985.
