= Francisco Ciutat de Miguel =

Spanish military officer

- Born: 1909; Kingdom of Spain
- Died: November 30th, 1986 (aged 77)
- Allegiance: Second Spanish Republic; Soviet Union; Republic of Cuba; Algeria; North Vietnam
- Branch: Spanish Republican Army; Red Army
- Conflicts: Spanish Civil War; World War II; Bay of Pigs Invasion; Escambray Rebellion; Sand War; Vietnam War
- Education: Voroshilov Academy

Francisco Ciutat de Miguel, known as Angelito (1909 – November 30, 1986), was a Spanish communist, lieutenant of infantry and commander.

== Spanish Civil War ==
He fought in the Battle of Santander, during the Spanish Civil War, in the summer of 1937 as a Chief of Operations of the Army of the North.

== Outside Spain ==
After the end of the Spanish Civil War, de Miguel fled to the Soviet Union, where he joined the Voroshilov Academy and married Sofía Kokuina. He later participated as a foreign military advisor to the Cuban Army during the Bay of Pigs Invasion. He also assisted the Algerian Army against Morocco during the Sand War and participated in the Vietnam War.

He later returned to Spain in 1977 after the death of Francisco Franco.

== Aliases ==
He had many aliases:

- Masonic name: Algazel
- Russian name: Pavel Pablovich Stepanov
- Cuban alias: Ángel Martínez Riosola
- Short name: Paco
- Commonly referred to as Angelito

== Bibliography ==
- Relatos y reflexiones de la Guerra de España 1936-1939 - Francisco Ciutat de Miguel. Forma Ediciones. Madrid 1978. (in Spanish)
