= Víctor Dreke =

Cuban Communist Party leader

- Born: Víctor Emilio Dreke Cruz; March 10, 1937 (age 89); Sagua La Grande, Cuba

Víctor Emilio Dreke Cruz (born 10 March 1937, in Sagua La Grande) is a Cuban Communist Party leader of African descent, and a former commander in the Cuban Revolutionary Armed Forces.

Following involvement in various student protests in Sagua la Grande 1952-54, Dreke joined the 26th of July Movement in 1955, soon after it was formed. In 1957 he helped form the student-based March 13 unit of the Directorio Revolucionario Estudantil in the Escambray Mountains in Las Villas Province. In October 1958 he came under the command of Che Guevara in a unification of the guerrillas of the 26th of July Movement and the Revolutionary Directorate. Dreke took part in armed actions against the government forces of the Fulgencio Batista regime, such as at Placetas, Báez, Manicaragua, and Santa Clara.

After the victory of the Cuban Revolution in 1959, Dreke was assigned in turn; a prosecutor for revolutionary tribunals; chief of police in Sagua la Grande; a company leader of the Western Tactical Force; head of a squadron of the Revolutionary Rural Police. He then became a Rebel Army platoon leader in the first actions in the Escambray. In 1960 he was chief of the Rebel army squadron in Cruces, and was also head of a militia training school in Hatillo.

On 17 April 1961, the first day of the Bay of Pigs Invasion, he assumed command of two companies of the 117th Battalion, taking part in a clash with paratroops of Brigade 2506. On 19 April, he was wounded and briefly captured after driving towards Girón in a jeep ahead of his tanks. In 1962 he was promoted to the rank of comandante. When the Lucha Contra Bandidos (LCB) special units were created that year he became head of LCB operations in the Escambray. Notably in March of 1962, he interrogated Margarito Lanza Flores (known as Tondique, an Afro-Cuban campesino anti-Castro rebel) upon the rebel's capture, later Tondique was murdered by firing squad. Dreke also served as second in command to Raúl Menéndez Tomassevich, head of the LCB within the Central Army, until January 1965, when the final cleanup operation was almost finished.

In April 1965, Comandante Dreke served as second in command to Che Guevara in the Cuban military training mission to the Democratic Republic of the Congo, to help train rebel fighters originally organised by supporters of former prime minister Patrice Lumumba (murdered in 1961). Guevara wrote about Dreke in his report to Fidel Castro: "He was... one of the pillars on which I relied. The only reason I am not recommending that he be promoted is that he already holds the highest rank."

The mission ended in November 1965. He then headed a military unit in Cuba preparing internationalist volunteers. In 1966 he headed the Cuban military mission to Guinea-Bissau/Cape Verde, where he served alongside Amílcar Cabral. He then performed a similar function in the Republic of Guinea. He returned to Guinea-Bissau in 1986, heading the Cuban military mission until 1989.

From 1965 to 1975, Dreke served on the central committee of the Cuban Communist Party. In 1969 he headed the political directorate of the Ministry of the Revolutionary Armed Forces. In 1972, he graduated from the Maximo Gomez Military Academy with a degree in politics. In 1973, he was appointed chief of the newly formed Ejército Juvenil del Trabajo (EJT, or Youth Army of Labor) in Oriente province, working on volunteer agricultural projects. In 1981 he graduated from the University of Santiago de Cuba with a degree in law.

In 1990, General Dreke retired from active military service. He then acted as representative in Africa for Cuban corporations ANTEX and UNECA in trade and construction projects.

He is currently vice president of the Cuba-Africa Friendship Association and a member of the Association of Combatants of the Cuban Revolution.

== Bibliography ==
- Dreke, Victor. 2002. From Escambray to the Congo: In the Whirlwind of the Cuban Revolution. Pathfinder. ISBN 0-87348-947-0 ISBN 978-0-87348-947-8
- Gleijeses, Piero. 2002. Conflicting Missions: Havana, Washington and Africa, 1959-1976. ISBN 978-0-8078-5464-8
