= Quemado de Güines =

- Municipality
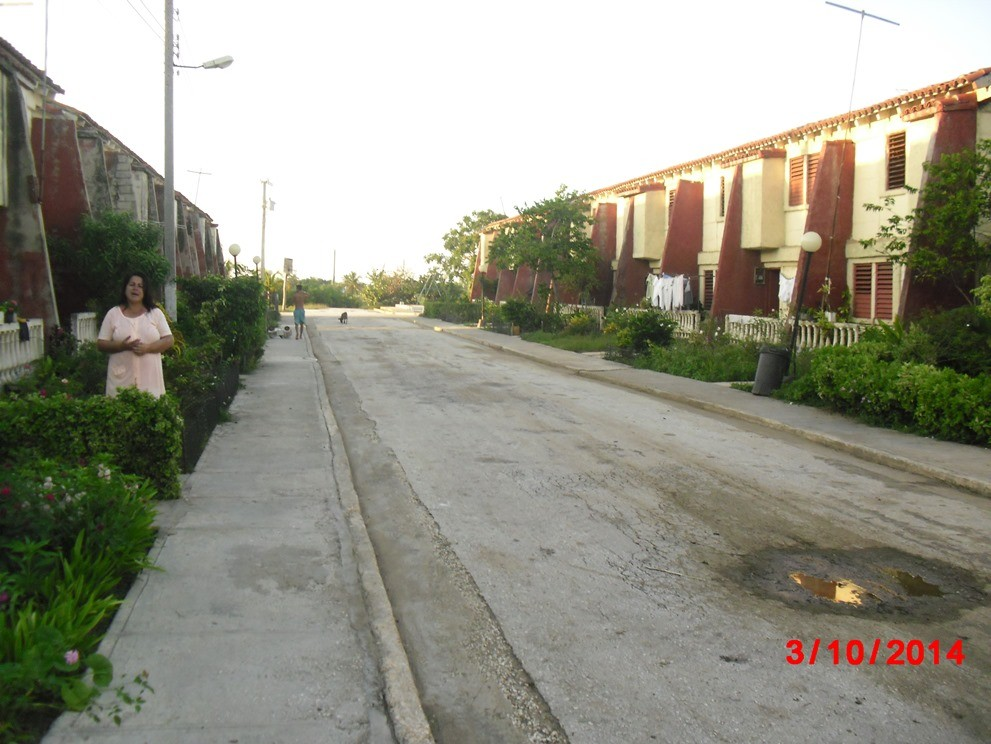
- Carahatas, a town located in the municipality

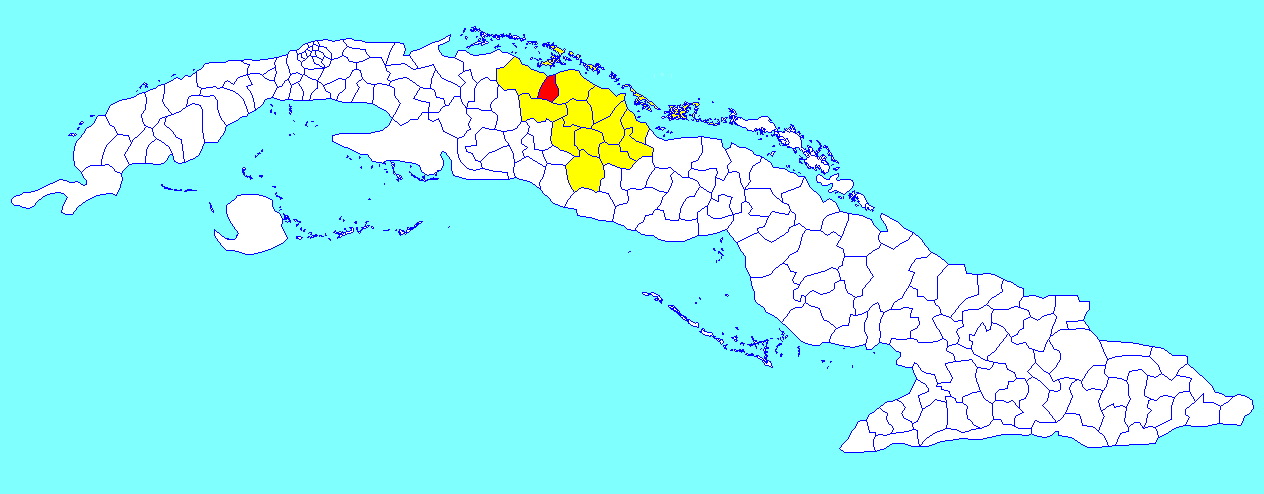
- Quemado de Güines municipality (red) within Villa Clara Province (yellow) and Cuba
- Coordinates: 22°47′24″N 80°15′22″W
- Country: Cuba
- Province: Villa Clara
- Founded: 1667

Government
  - President: Osmel Pérez Negrín
  - Vice-President: Ana María Mari Machado

Area
  - Total: 338 km^{2} (131 sq mi)
- Elevation: 85 m (279 ft)

Population (2022)
  - Total: 20,533
  - Density: 60.7/km^{2} (157/sq mi)
- Time zone: UTC-5 (EST)
- Area code: +53-422

Quemado de Güines (Spanish pronunciation: [keˈmaðo ðe ˈɣwines]) is a municipality and town in the Villa Clara Province of Cuba. It was founded in 1667.

== Geography ==
The municipality is divided into the poblados of Caguaguas, Carahatas, Güines, Paso Cavado, Poblado, San Valentín and Zambumbia and Jose R. Riquelme.

It borders with the municipalities of Corralillo in the west, Sagua la Grande in the east, and Santo Domingo in south.

== Demographics ==
In 2004, the municipality of Quemado de Güines had a population of 22,590. With a total area of 338 km^{2} (131 sq mi), it has a population density of 66.8/km^{2} (173/sq mi). In 2022 the population number had dropped to 20,533.

== Notable people ==
- Osvaldo Farrés
- Enrique Núñez Rodríguez (writer)
- Jorge Salazar (cyclist)
- Julito Martinez (actor)

== See also ==
- Municipalities of Cuba
- List of cities in Cuba
