= Zoila Águila Almeida =

Cuban revolutionary combatant and political prisoner (died 2021)

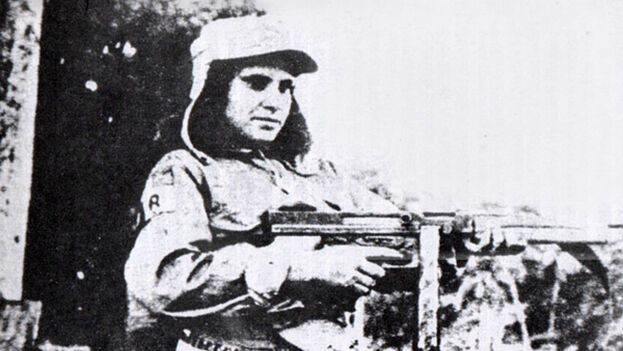
- Zoila Águila Almeida during the Escambray rebellion
- Born: 1939; Placetas, Las Villas, Cuba
- Died: 31 January 2021 (aged 82); Hialeah, Florida, U.S.
- Other names: "La Niña de Placetas" "La Niña del Escambray" "The Girl of Escambray"
- Spouse: Manuel Manso La Guardia

Zoila Águila Almeida (c. 1939 – 31 January 2021) was a Cuban dissident, guerrilla fighter, and political prisoner.

== Biography ==
Almeida was born in Placetas, formerly Las Villas province, Cuba, about 1939. Her exact date of birth is unknown. She joined the Second National Front of Escambray, under the command of Eloy Gutiérrez Menoyo, as a combatant at age 19 or 20. She first fought against Fulgencio Batista's forces, then against Fidel Castro's forces thereafter. Her guerrilla force fought in the Las Villas mountains during the Escambray rebellion from 1960 to 1964 against the Castro regime. She fought in hundreds of skirmishes during this time, eventually becoming the leader of a twelve man rebel group. Due to her youth, she became known as "La Niña de Placetas" (The Girl from Placetas) or "La Niña del Escambray" (The Girl from Escambray).

She married a fellow revolutionary, former electrician Manuel Manso La Guardia, and the two fought together for many years. Some sources state that Almeida gave birth to two daughters in the mountains of Las Villas. Both died as infants in the mountains from starvation or dehydration. Other sources state that Aleida never gave birth but instead suffered two miscarriages. Almeida, her husband, and about thirty other rebels were captured by Castro's forces in 1964. The couple were sent to Villa Marista, a prison used by Castro's forces to house political prisoners. There they were separated and later tried and convicted. La Guardia was one of twelve prisoners executed by firing squad on June 22, 1964. Almeida was one of 12 to 18 rebels sentenced to thirty years in prison.

Almeida suffered severe torture in the Castro regime's prisons and served more than half the sentence before being released as part of deal with the United States. The United States and Cuba signed an agreement to release thousands of political prisoners, and Almeida was one of those released. She began living in Miami by the early 1980s. Almeida remained in the area for the remainder of her life, shunning any publicity.

Almeida died of COVID-19 in Hialeah, Florida, on 31 January 2021, at age 82, amidst the COVID-19 pandemic in Florida.
