= Territorial Troops Militia =

- Milicias de Tropas Territoriales - MTT
- Active: 1980s–present
- Country: Cuba
- Branch: Cuban Revolutionary Army
- Type: Militia
- Role: Local Defense; Direct action; Sabotage; Internal Security
- Size: 2 million
- Engagements: Cold War

The Territorial Troops Militia (Spanish: Milicias de Tropas Territoriales - MTT), is a Cuban paramilitary militia composed exclusively of civilian volunteers. It was established in May 1980, and placed under the command of the Cuban Revolutionary Armed Forces (MINFAR).

Its creation is recognized as having marked the beginning of Cuba's official embrace of the military doctrine of the War of All the People, which has remained in force since then. Like the MNR (National Revolutionary Militia) of the early 1960s, the MTT's formation reinforced the notion of the popular will to defend the Revolution.

In general, the militia is a part-time force with only light arms which are issued to them only on occasion.

== Manning ==
Most members of the MTT are women, the elderly, or retirees. Male teenagers who are too young or have not yet been called for military service are eligible to join the MTT, as are men who are not obligated to serve as reservists. The MTT expanded from 500,000 members in 1982 to 1.2 million by mid-1984. The size of the force has remained at about 1 million, despite the economic crisis.

The MTT's mission during a crisis would be to fight alongside, and provide replacements for, the personnel of the regular armed force; to help protect such strategic infrastructure as bridges, highways, and railroads; and to carry out any other measures that might be needed to immobilize, wear down, or ultimately destroy the enemy. In the early 1980s, MTT members were extensively involved in the construction of tunnels throughout Cuba, for use as civic shelters in the event of an attack.

As a result of Cuba's continuing economic difficulties during the 1990s, the time that MTT members have spent in training and preparing for their various defense-related activities has been reduced. The reduction includes a decrease in the time that MTT members have spent in carrying out joint exercises and maneuvers with regular FAR troops.

== Financing ==
The MTT is supported through the MINFAR's budget and through voluntary donations made by citizens. Most of these donations come from workplace contributions, which are paid through weekly deductions from workers' salaries. According to the MINFAR, between 1981 and 1995, the expenses incurred for the MTT's training averaged approximately 35 million Cuban pesos per year. During this same period, popular contributions toward the force averaged about 30 million pesos per year.

Just over half of the training expenditures went toward the purchase of study supplies and other training materials. Just over one-third were dedicated for the purchase of weapons, communication equipment, uniforms, and spare parts. Other organizations also set annual funding goals with respect to their own MTT contributions. Among such organizations were the CDR (Committee for the Defense of the Revolution), the Federation of Cuban Women (Federación de Mujeres Cubanas-FMC), the National Association of Small Farmers (Asociación Nacional de Agricultores Pequeños-ANAP), and even the Organization of Jose Marti Pioneers (Organización de Pioneros José Martí-OPJM).

In 1995, reforms for allocating MTT funds were made in the system. The funds collected for the MTT are no longer sent to a central government account, but remain within each municipality to support local MTT activities. Despite Cuba's economic hardships, the amount of funds collected through popular contributions to the MTT continued to increase after the beginning of the Special Period in the early 1990s. In 1995, the MINFAR was paying only 14 percent of the MTT's total expenditures.
