= Juan Vitalio Acuña Núñez =

Cuban politician (1925–1967)

Juan Vitalio Acuña Núñez (1925–1967) was a Cuban politician.
