= Escambray =

Escambray is a Cuban newspaper. It is published in Spanish, with an online English language edition. The newspaper is located in Sancti Spíritus.
