= Manuel Fajardo =

Cuban revolutionary physician (1930–1960)

Manuel Piti Fajardo Rivero
- Born: Manuel Piti Fajardo Rivero; 8 November 1930; Manzanillo, Cuba
- Disappeared: Trinidad, Cuba
- Died: November 29, 1960 (aged 30)
- Occupation: Revolutionary physician
- Organization: 26th of July Movement

Manuel Piti Fajardo Rivero (Manzanillo, 8 November 1930 – Trinidad, 29 November 1960) was a Cuban revolutionary physician and fighter of the Rebel Army in the Sierra Maestra.

== Biography ==
His primary studies were carried out at the José María Heredia School located in his native town, and he then graduated from high school. He moved to Havana, where he studied medicine at the University of Havana.

Upon graduating, he worked as a surgeon at the Emergency Hospital of Havana. He then returned to his hometown and worked at the Civil Hospital there. He worked under the commander - Doctor René Vallejo at the La Caridad clinic, where they healed the wounded of the Rebel Army and of the clandestine fighters.

== Revolutionary path ==
Piti Fajardo had the professional responsibility of assisting the wounded Rebel Army sent from the Sierra.

On 24 March 1958, he followed Dr. Vallejo and joined the Sierra. There he changed his duty as a doctor to military and became a soldier. He then participated in the battles of "Santo Domingo","Providencia", "Cuatro Caminos", "Las Mercedes", "El Jigüe", "Cerro Pelado", "Veguitas", "El Meriño" and "El Salto", in which for his outstanding work he finally reached the rank of captain. In the course the construction of several hospitals that were built in the Sierra during the rebellion, where many soldiers of the Rebel Army were saved, under Fidel's orders, he again acted as a doctor while he assumed the position of the arsenal of war and recorded the accounts of the teams.

During the Batista offensive, he acted with the guerrillas as a front-line doctor, attending to the wounded in combat.

When Fidel Castro ordered Commander Eduardo Lalo Sardiñas to go forward with Column No. 12, Simón Bolivar, to stop the forces of tyranny get control of the border of Camagüey and Oriente and get them out of the way of invading columns of Ernesto Che Guevara and Camilo Cienfuegos, as they advanced towards Las Villas, Piti Fajardo planned the operations with Sardiñas and Castro's order was carried out.

Then the Sardiñas troops were divided into two groups for operational purposes. Fajardo was placed in front, to control the Las Tunas Province, Holguín, Puerto Padre and Jobabo, among others. Column 12, formed the Fourth Front and there Piti launched communications, the hospital and combined military operations with Lalo Sardiñas.

== After the victory of the revolution ==
When the armed struggle triumphed, Manuel Fajardo was promoted to commander, appointed as director of the Civil Hospital of Manzanillo and, later, director of the Military Hospital of Santiago de Cuba. He also assisted a congress in Porto Alegre (Brazil). Shortly afterwards, he was appointed chief of operations for the Sierra and directed the capture operations of Manuel Beatón's band.

As a priority of the works of the Camilo Cienfuegos School City, Fajardo inaugurated the first unit with 500 «camilitos», on 26 July 1960. For a period of time, in 1960, he was Fidel Castro's family doctor, when the chief of the revolution suffered a respiratory condition.

== Death ==
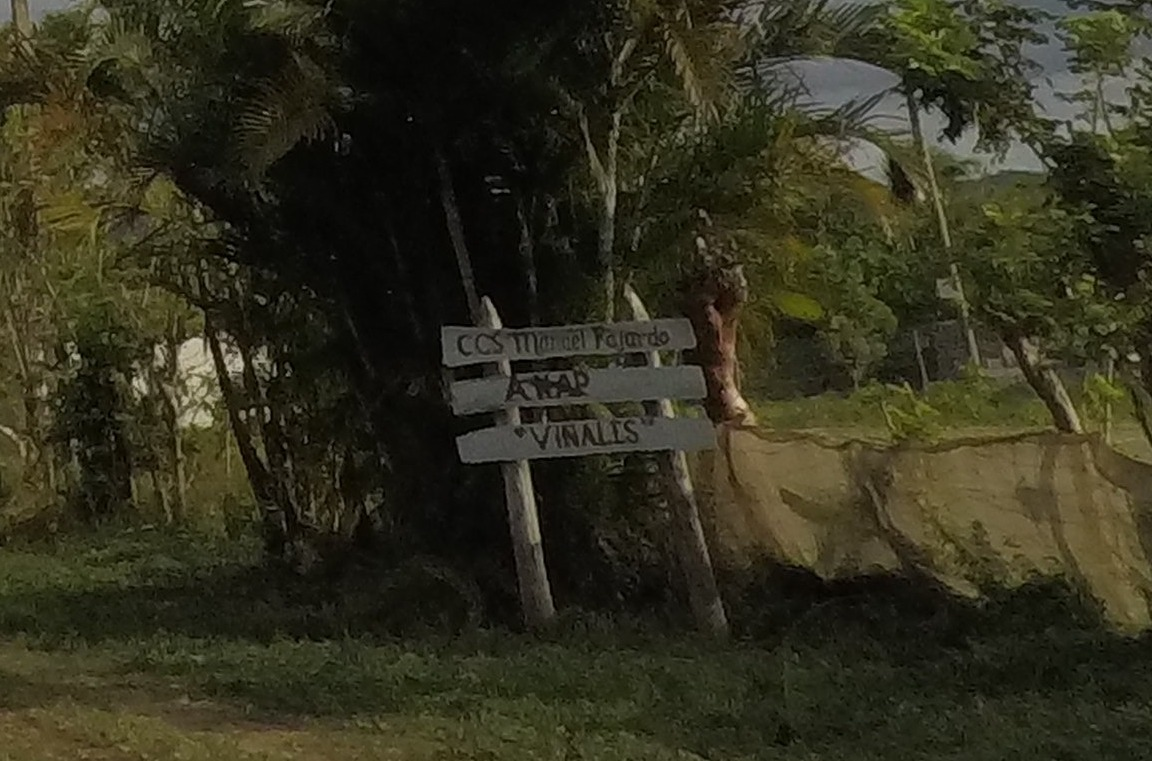
CCS Manuel Fajardo in Viñales, named after the revolutionary

In November 1960, he was appointed Chief of Operations in the area of the Escambray Mountains, in the center of Cuba, with the task of cleaning the area of reactionary elements. In that effort, he was mortally wounded and killed in a confrontation on November 29 of the same year in a rural area 4.5 km west of the town of Trinidad (Las Villas province). He was 30 years old.
