= National Revolutionary Militia =

Citizen's militia in Cuba

The National Revolutionary Militia (Spanish: Milicias Nacionales Revolucionarias) (MNR) was a citizens' militia in the Republic of Cuba. It was founded in 1959 in the aftermath of the Cuban Revolution to protect buildings against sabotage from "counter-revolutionary" armed groups and any external threat of intervention. Under the command of Cuban Revolutionary Armed Forces (FAR), it was a voluntary group which served as a way to ensure widespread participation in the revolution. While MNR members were often assigned noncombat tasks, they played an important role on the frontline during the Bay of Pigs invasion in 1961 and defeating the 1958–1965 Escambray Rebellion.

== History ==
The militias have their origins in a ceremony celebrated in front of the Presidential Palace (presently the Museum of the Revolution) in Havana on 22 March 1959. There, Cuban prime minister Fidel Castro proposed creating the Voluntary Popular Militias, in response to the popular call to prepare citizens militarily to defend the Revolution; the idea definitely took shape in the NRM. On 16 April of each year, Cuba celebrates Militiaman Day, in honor of the combatants of this organization who on the same date in 1961, defended the socialist character of the Cuban Revolution, that Fidel Castro had proclaimed on 1 January 1959. On 17 April 1961, together with mobilized servicemen of the Cuban Revolutionary Army and the National Revolutionary Police, the militias confronted and defeated in less than 72 hours 1,500 counter-revolutionaries whom the United States financed, armed and trained to invade Cuba at Playa Girón (Giron beach), in what became known as the Bay of Pigs Invasion.

The NRM was replaced by the Territorial Troops Militia in the 1980s.

== University Militias ==
These were actually founded on 26 October 1959, when Fidel Castro raised the need to create a University Militia to help train the National Revolutionary Militias. The university students, who had attended the event in front of the Presidential Palace, from there set out toward the Hill and the coffee shop of the house of higher studies, between refreshments, with notebook sheets turned into enlistment forms, agreed that the University Militia be named the José Antonio Echeverría Brigade.

After weeks of training, on 27 November 1959, uniformed in wine-red shirts, gray pants and black berets, armed with the M1 Garand rifles that Fidel had sent them, the boys at the University Student Federation (USF) returned to the Escalanita en masse. A whistle was heard and a squad of girls began to perform evolutions. In its journey through San Lázaro street up to the La Punta monument, the student militiamen were applauded by the people. This parade went on to become the catalyst of large scale popular enthusiasm for the constitution of the National Revolutionary Militias.

The graduation of the University Militia in January 1960 was done with an ascent up Pico Turquino, where they were joined by Fidel Castro, Celia Sánchez and other revolutionary leaders.

The University Militias then became the 154th Battalion of the National Revolutionary Militias, consisting of students, professors and workers. Presently this unit is known as the 154th Regiment of the Territorial Militia Troops.
