= Osvaldo Ramírez García =

Cuban revolutionary and dissident (1921–1962)

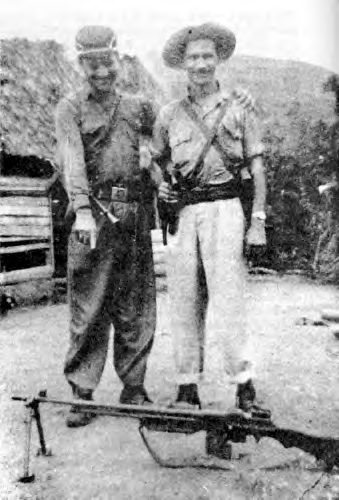
- Born: 6 July 1921; Guayos, Villa Clara Province, Cuba
- Died: 16 April 1962 (aged 40); Escambray, Cuba
- Cause of death: Killed in action
- Occupation: Revolutionary. Later Counterrevolutionary
- Spouse: Estrella Cuéllar
- Relatives: Nereida Ramírez, María Ramírez, Osvaldo Ramírez Jr., René Ramírez

Osvaldo Ramírez García (6 July 1921 – 16 April 1962) was a Cuban revolutionary and anti-communist rebel. He was a member of the Revolutionary Directorate of 13 March Movement, involved in the overthrow of the Batista regime, and later was involved in the armed resistance to Fidel Castro. He was a member of the National Revolutionary Police Force and after the break with Castro, he was commander of an anti-communist rebel formation, one of the leaders of the Escambray Rebellion. He was killed during the rebellion by government forces.

== Cuban Revolution ==
He was born into a peasant family from the Villa Clara Province. Since his youth he worked as a truck driver. He was dedicated to transporting sugar cane and wood dumped in the Escambray Mountains. Later he was able to rent land. He was married and had two sons and two daughters. Since 1952, Osvaldo Ramírez was opposed to Fulgencio Batista. He entered the Revolutionary Directory on 13 March. Ramírez transported weapons in his truck and participated in armed attacks against government targets. During the fighting with Batista's troops in 1958, he was one of the commanders of the Second National Front of Escambray. He served under the command of Eloy Gutiérrez Menoyo and William Alexander Morgan.

After the victory of the Cuban Revolution, Ramírez joined the new National Revolutionary Police of Cuba. He held the officer rank of captain. He was appointed commander of the Castillo del Príncipe prison in Havana.

Osvaldo Ramírez was a staunch anti-communist. By 1959, he came into conflict with the new Cuban authorities. He condemned the expropriation of agricultural land and the brutality of political repression. As a government official, he attempted to resist expropriations and redistribution of land in the town of Caracousse near Trinidad. He harshly criticized Raúl Castro and Che Guevara for the brutality of order in the Castillo del Príncipe. Later, representatives of the communist authorities explained Ramírez's position with "individualistic ambitions."

== Anti-communist resistance ==
=== Commander of the eighth column ===
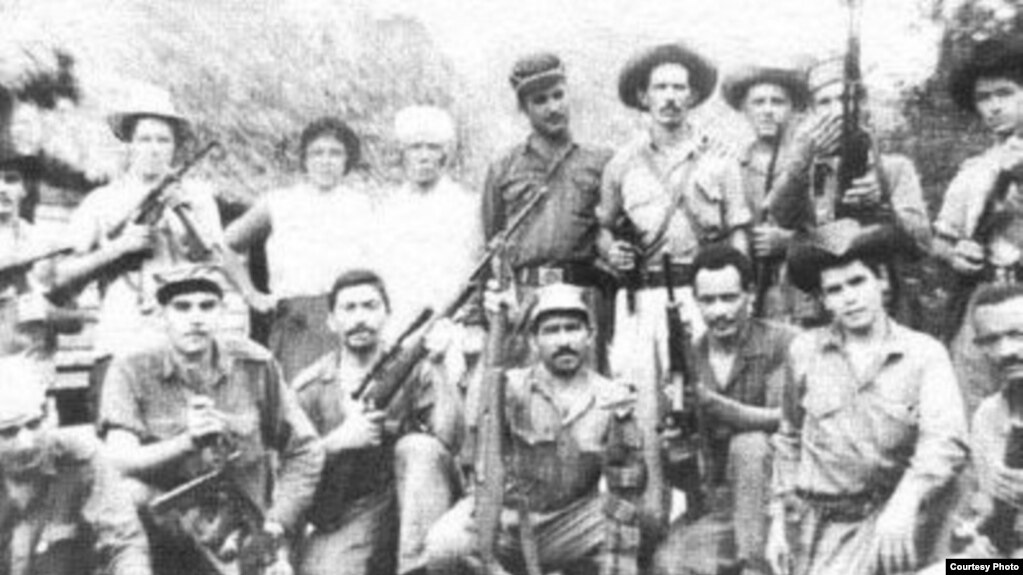
Osvaldo Ramírez and the insurgents of the Escambray Rebellion in 1960

In October 1959, Osvaldo Ramírez split from Fidel Castro's regime and disappeared in the Escambray Mountains. He formed an armed detachment and led a rebellion against the government. Initially, the detachment consisted of only 18 rebels, then it increased to several dozen, and then to 200 or 300. Ramírez's formation consisted mainly of peasant landowners and agricultural workers oriented towards them, dissatisfied with Castro's agrarian policy, the expropriations and collectivization, the dictatorial policies of the new administration, and state intervention in the traditional peasant way of life. Ramírez was motivated by his actions with resistance to the communist regime in the name of democracy and considered it a continuation of the previous fight against Fulgencio Batista. The partisan struggle was seen as a recreation of the Second National Front of Escambray. The political wing of the formation was called the National Democratic Front.

In the early 1960s, Osvaldo Ramírez was considered one of the main guerrilla commanders, along with Sinecio Walsh, Evelio Duque, Plinio Prieto and Edel Montiel. Following the execution of Walsh and Prieto in October 1960, Evelio Duque assumed overall command of the seven rebel columns. According to other commanders, Osvaldo Ramírez led the 8th Column, a rebel formation that enjoyed extensive operational and combat autonomy.

Ramírez's rebels attacked government officials, communist activists, leaders of agricultural cooperatives, the Committees for the Defense of the Revolution, and the Integrated Revolutionary Organizations. The rebels clashed with government troops, police and militias. The battle near the town of San Ambrosio on January 12, 1961, became widely known: Ramírez's militants laid an ambush, machine-gunned a militia patrol (of 18 militiamen, only one survived) and seized its weapons. State and cooperative businesses and agricultural product warehouses were also attacked. They tried to match the most resonant actions with the date of March 13. Ramírez paid great attention to ensuring mass support among the population. Special groups of sympathetic peasants were created, combining the tasks of supply, agitation and intelligence. Ramírez's formation managed to survive despite the massive offensive by government forces in early 1960–1961, La Primera Médica del Escambray.

Despite the demoralization after the defeat of the Bay of Pigs Invasion, Ramírez and his combatants continued the war in the Sierra del Escambray. The rebels showed great tenacity in battles. Osvaldo Ramírez himself proved to be a skilled and tactically competent guerrilla commander. He quickly rose to prominence among rebel commanders and acquired the reputation of being "the most daring partisan." Once captured, Ramírez managed to escape, throwing himself into a mountain gorge in front of the convoy. Of all the Escambray rebels, Ramírez was the only one to whom Fidel Castro offered (through Minister Faure Chomón) a personal amnesty and guaranteed life. In response, Ramírez invited Castro to lay down his arms and come to Escambray to talk and also guaranteed his life. Castro declined the offer.

At the same time, the rebels showed great cruelty in retaliating against communist activists. The most famous is the murder of Professor Conrado Benítez. This event was actively used in the anti-insurgency propaganda of the authorities. Ramírez prohibited the execution of unarmed opponents. Exceptions were only allowed for those known to have killed rebels and sympathizers, and documented evidence was required in each case.

=== Commander of the rebel army ===
On 15 July 1961, the commanders of the largest anti-communist detachments met in Zicatero. The National Liberation Army (ELN) was created, the Cuban anti-communist army with a coordination headquarters. Despite tensions between Osvaldo Ramírez and Evelio Duque, Ramírez became the sole commander in chief of the ELN. In December, the political leader of the anti-Castro rebel resistance, José Ramón Ruiz Sánchez, approved Osvaldo Ramírez as the head of the entire rebel movement of the Eight Columns of Escambray.

"I promise to fight against communism until the liberation of Cuba or until my own death in Cuba." – Osvaldo Ramirez

The authorities were seriously concerned about the magnitude of the Escambray Rebellion. Large forces of the army, police and government militias under the command of Juan Almeida Bosque and Raúl Menéndez Tomassevich were launched against the rebels. The new offensive was called The Second Cleaning of Escambray. The State Security Service, under the operational leadership of Luis Felipe Denis, recruited one of Ramírez's agents, Dr. Filiberto Cabrera. From a helicopter, Cabrera indicated the location of the rebel camp.

On April 16, 1962, the mountain base of Los Aramos del Velázquez was attacked by troops and militias. A tenacious battle ensued. At first, Osvaldo Ramírez again managed to break the encirclement and escape. However, several hours later he was killed in a shootout with a communist militia. The report on Ramírez's death was received by the commander of the Central Military Zone, Juan Almeida Bosque. Oswaldo Ramírez was succeeded in command of the ELN by Tomás San Gil, previously head of the guerrilla headquarters and commander of militants in several areas. San Gil was assassinated on 28 February 1963.

== Legacy ==
The attitude towards Osvaldo Ramírez varies across the Cuban community. Cuban authorities characterize him as a "brutal counterrevolutionary bandit and CIA agent," speaking of his bad character and addiction to alcohol. Cuban dissidents consider Ramírez a hero of the liberation struggle, a "humble worker," a brave fighter against two dictatorships and leader of an "anti-totalitarian crusade." Representatives of the Cuban opposition, especially in Villa Clara Province, commemorated the date of Osvaldo Ramírez's death.

Osvaldo Ramírez's wife was subjected to surveillance, harassment and insults in Cuba for a long time. Later, the family had the opportunity to emigrate. Ramírez's descendants resides in Miami. Osvaldo Ramírez Jr. actively promotes his father's legacy. On 16 April 2010, on the anniversary of his death, the Masonic lodge Comandante Osvaldo Ramírez García No. 3 was created in Miami. Osvaldo Ramírez's stylistic signature was wearing a Stetson cowboy hat. His favorite weapon was the M1 carbine or Thompson submachine Gun.

== See also ==
- Orlando Bosch Ávila
