= Alberto Delgado =

Alberto Delgado may refer to:

- Alberto Delgado (jockey) (born 1964), American jockey
- Alberto Delgado (Cuban footballer) (born 1978), Cuban footballer
- Alberto Delgado (Spanish footballer) (born 1991), Spanish footballer

== See also ==
- Alberto Delgado Airport, an airport serving Trinidad, Cuba
