= List of World Heritage Sites in Cuba =

Location of World Heritage Sites within Cuba

Cuba accepted the UNESCO World Heritage Convention on 24 March 1981, making its cultural and natural sites eligible for inclusion on the World Heritage Sites list. As of 2025, Cuba has nine sites inscribed on the list.

Cuba's first site was inscribed at the 6th Session of the World Heritage Committee, held at UNESCO headquarters in Paris, France, in December 1982. At that session, Old Havana and its Fortifications—which includes the historic centre of the Cuban capital, Havana, as well as its Spanish colonial fortifications—was added to the list.

A range of Cuban sites are represented on the World Heritage List. Two sites are recognised for their natural significance: Alejandro de Humboldt National Park in the eastern provinces of Holguín and Guantánamo, and Desembarco del Granma National Park, named after the yacht that transported members of the 26th of July Movement at the outset of the Cuban Revolution. Urban landscapes on the list include Old Havana, Trinidad, and Camagüey, all of which were founded by Spanish colonists in the 16th century. The inscribed sites also encompass historic agricultural regions, such as the coffee plantations of south-eastern Cuba, and the tobacco-growing area of the Viñales Valley.

== World Heritage Sites ==
UNESCO designates World Heritage Sites according to ten selection criteria. Each listed site must meet at least one criterion. Criteria i to vi relate to cultural heritage, while criteria vii to x concern natural heritage.

World Heritage Sites
Site	Image	Location (province)	Year listed	UNESCO data	Description
Old Havana and its Fortifications	Cathedral's Plaza	La Habana	1982	204; iv, v (cultural)	Havana was founded in 1519 by Spanish colonists and developed into one of the Caribbean's principal shipbuilding centres by the 17th century. The historic city was constructed primarily in the Baroque and Neoclassical styles. Notable landmarks in Old Havana include La Cabaña, the Cathedral of Havana, and the Great Theatre of Havana.
Trinidad and the Valley de los Ingenios	A group of buildings with red roofs in the middle of green trees and hills. There is a taller building with a tower in the center.	Sancti Spíritus	1988	460; iv, v (cultural)	The city of Trinidad was founded in the early 16th century. In 1518, Hernán Cortés began his expedition to Mexico from the port of Trinidad. The city prospered during the colonial period largely due to the success of the local sugar industry. The adjacent Valley de los Ingenios was a centre of the Cuban sugar industry from the 18th century onwards and contains numerous cane sugar mills, as well as cattle ranches and tobacco plantations.
San Pedro de la Roca Castle, Santiago de Cuba	A series of walls made of stone sit on a hill that is above water.	Santiago de Cuba	1997	841; iv; v (cultural)	The fort was constructed to defend the strategically important port of Santiago de Cuba. Its design reflects Italian and Renaissance architecture. The complex of magazines, bastions, and batteries is considered one of the most complete and best-preserved Spanish-American defensive fortification systems.
Desembarco del Granma National Park		Granma	1999	889; vii, viii (natural)	The national park is named after the yacht that transported Fidel Castro, Raúl Castro, Che Guevara, and other members of the 26th of July Movement to Cuba at the outset of the Cuban Revolution. The park is characterised by distinctive karst topography, including terraces, cliffs, and waterfalls.
Viñales Valley	There is a field with tall grass and trees and a small wooden hut in the front, and steep cliffs in the back.	Pinar del Río	1999	840; iv (cultural)	The village of Viñales was founded in 1875 following the expansion of tobacco cultivation in the surrounding valley. The landscape is characterised by karst topography, vernacular architecture, and traditional agricultural practices. The area was also the site of military engagements during the Cuban War of Independence and the Cuban Revolution.
Archaeological Landscape of the First Coffee Plantations in the South-East of Cuba.		Santiago de Cuba and Guantánamo	2000	1008; iii, iv (cultural)	During the 19th and early 20th centuries, eastern Cuba was a major centre of coffea cultivation. The surviving plantation remains illustrate the techniques used to exploit challenging terrain and demonstrate the economic and social significance of plantation agriculture in Cuba and the wider Caribbean.
Alejandro de Humboldt National Park	Tall green trees and hills are on both sides of a river in the center.	Holguín and Guantánamo	2001	839; ix, x (natural)	The rivers originating in the park's mountainous terrain are among the largest in the insular Caribbean. The park displays a wide range of geological formations and contains numerous endemic species, including 16 of Cuba's 28 endemic plant species, as well as fauna such as the endangered Cuban solenodon.
Historic Centre of Cienfuegos	A building with yellow walls has two towers of different heights with round red roofs. There are bells in the tallest tower.	Cienfuegos	2005	1202; ii, v (cultural)	Cienfuegos was founded in 1819 as a Spanish colony, although its first settlers were French immigrants. Its location on Cienfuegos Bay contributed to its development as a trading centre for sugar cane, tobacco, and coffee. Owing to its relatively late foundation, the city exhibits modern influences in architecture and urban planning.
Historic Centre of Camagüey	There is a large stone building in the center with a tall tower. Behind are several smaller buildings with red roofs.	Camagüey	2008	1270; iv, v (cultural)	Camagüey was among the first seven villages founded by the Spanish in Cuba, first settled in 1528. Its irregular street layout contrasts with the more orderly plans of many other Spanish colonial towns. This maze-like design reflects medieval European influences and traditional construction practices used by early settlers.

== Tentative list ==
In addition to properties inscribed on the World Heritage List, States Parties may maintain a list of sites on a tentative list that they intend to consider for future nomination. Nominations to the World Heritage List are accepted only for sites that have previously been included on a State Party's tentative list. Cuba has three properties included on its tentative list.

Tentative sites
Site	Image	Location (province)	Year listed	UNESCO criteria	Description
Ciénaga de Zapata National Park		Matanzas	2003	vii, ix, x (natural)	The park is designated as a Biosphere Reserve and contains a diverse range of landscapes and species, including extensive mangrove forests and areas of coral reef.
National Schools of Art, Cubanacán		La Habana	2003	i, ii, iii, iv, v (cultural)	The National Schools of Art were established in 1962 to train artists in the visual arts, music, ballet, drama, and modern and folkloric dance. The architecture represents a form of Cuban contemporary style, with the architects making extensive use of brick in place of cement, which was scarce at the time.
Reef System in the Cuban Caribbean		Pinar del Río, Artemisa, La Habana, Mayabeque, Matanzas, Cienfuegos, Villa Clara, Sancti Spíritus, Ciego de Ávila, Camagüey	2003	vii, x (natural)	The proposed site comprises multiple sections of coral reef along Cuba's southern coastline, particularly within the Canarreos and Jardines de la Reina archipelagos. It extends from the Guanahacabibes Peninsula at the westernmost point of the country to Jardines de la Reina in the south-east. In total, the reef system extends for approximately 800 kilometers (500 mi) and includes nine protected areas.

== See also ==
- List of Intangible Cultural Heritage elements in Cuba
