= Plaza Mayor, Trinidad =

Plaza in the center of Trinidad, Cuba

Coordinates: 21°48′15″N 79°58′59″W

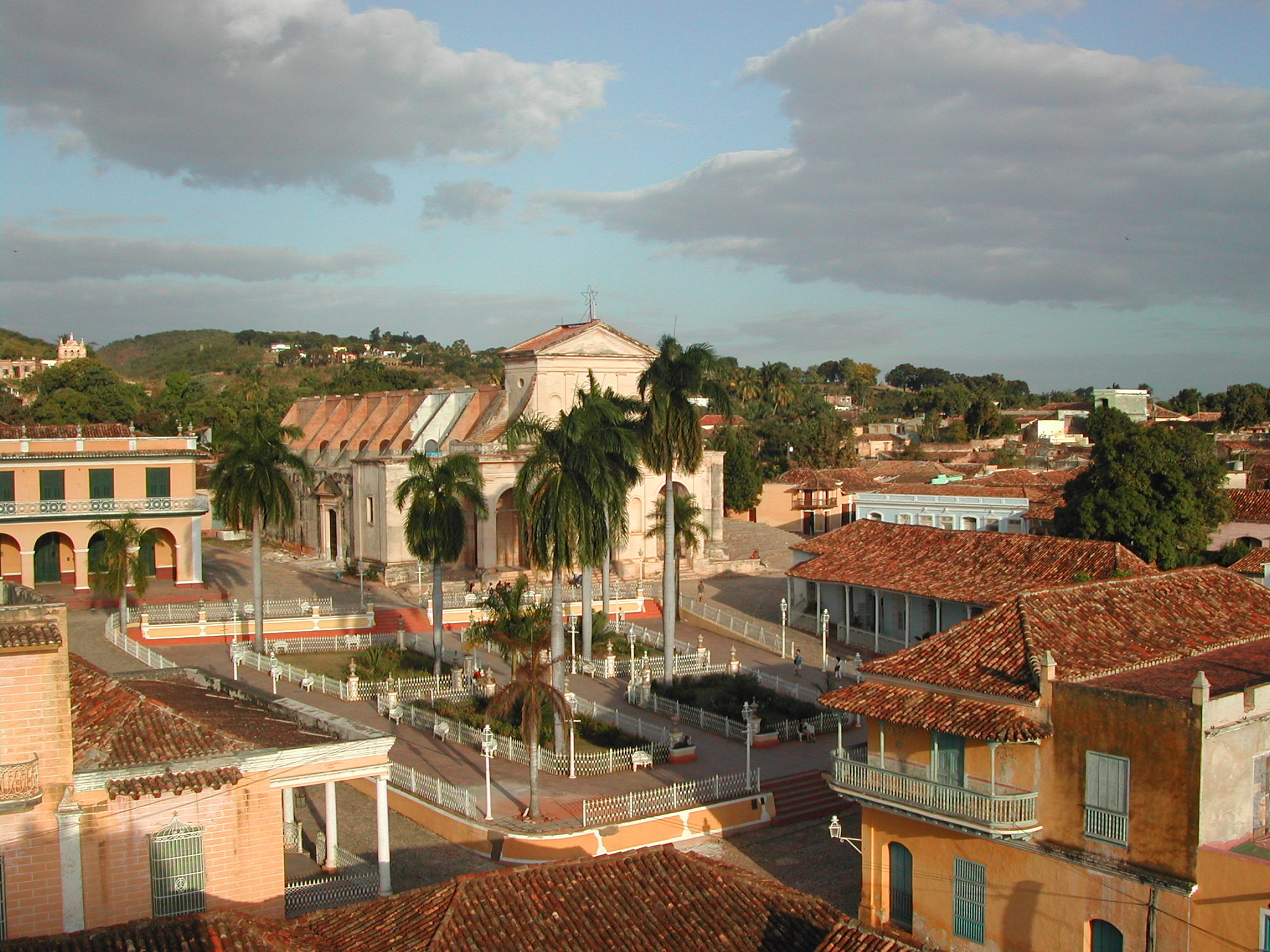
The Plaza Mayor. Above the square, Church of the Holy Trinity; to right of church, Brunet Palace. In distance on hill, Ermita de Nuestra Señora de la Candelaria de la Popa.

The Plaza Mayor in Trinidad, Cuba, is the historic centre of the town, declared a UNESCO World Heritage Site in 1988.

== History ==
The buildings surrounding the plaza (central square) date from the 18th and 19th centuries when trade in sugar from the nearby Valle de los Ingenios and the slave trade brought great riches to the area. Many of the buildings surrounding the plaza belonged to the wealthy landowners of the city.

When the trade in sugar diminished and the slave trade ended in the mid-19th century, Trinidad became a backwater and little building work occurred until the 1950s. As a result, many of the historic buildings and streets were preserved, especially the grand colonial edifices in the immediate vicinity of the Plaza Mayor. Today, most of the former houses surrounding the square serve to house museums.

== Plaza ==
The small sloping Plaza Mayor has gardens on a raised platform, with paths dividing it in quarters. The resulting four small garden beds are fenced off by white wrought-iron fences. Cobbled streets surround the square, separating it from the surrounding buildings. Wrought-iron lamp-posts, statues of English greyhounds, and columns with large terra-cotta finials decorate the plaza.

== Buildings ==
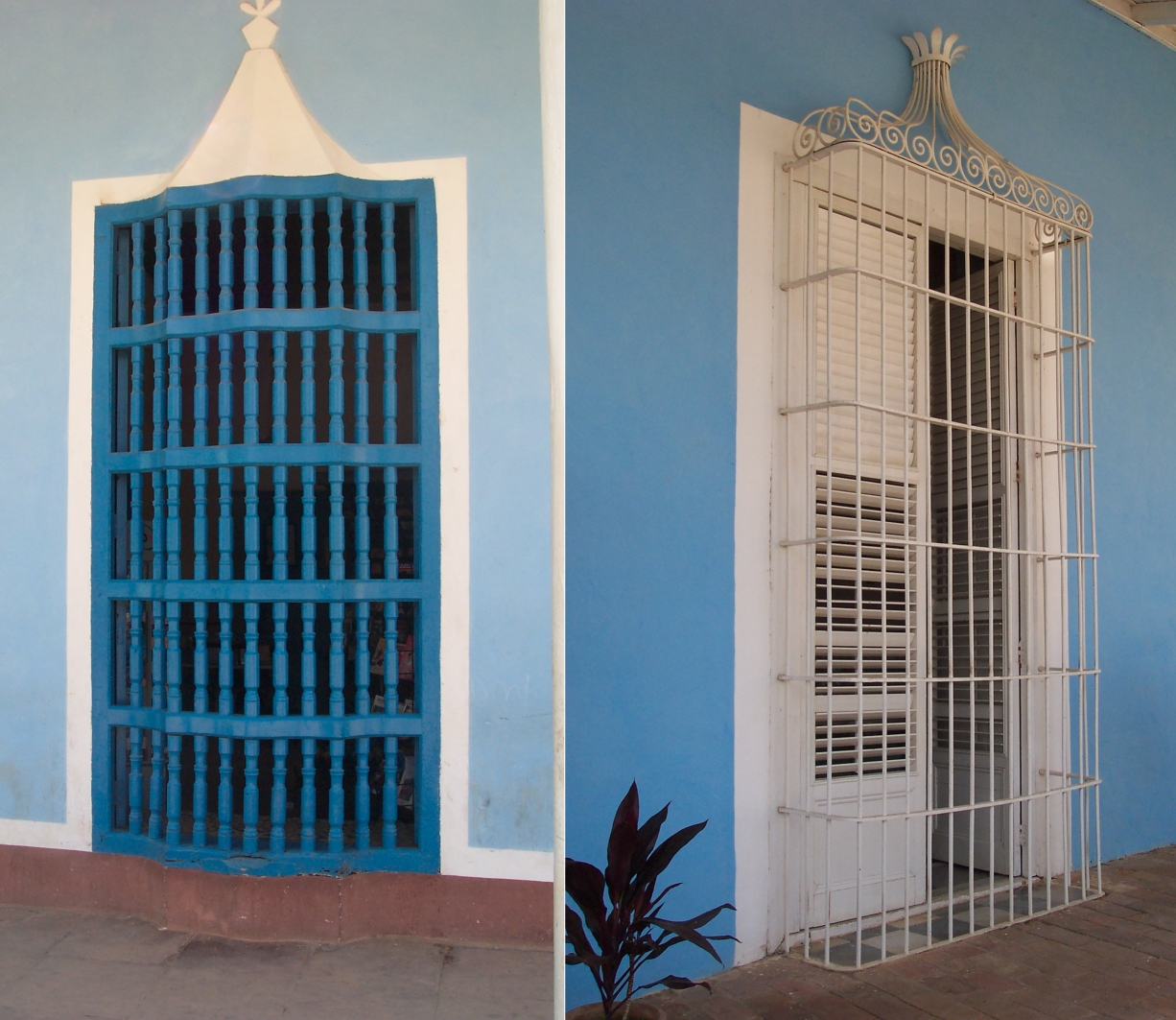
The barrotes of the 18th century (left), were replaced in the 19th century by grilles decorated with ornamental motifs (right)

The colonial houses of Trinidad are typified by red terracotta tiled roofs supported beyond the walls by wooden beams. Pastel-coloured paintwork for the houses is normal with wood and plasterwork details picked out in different colours to the brickwork.

The large main door typically has a smaller entrance door (or doors) cut into it. In contrast to the houses of the same period in Havana the door tends to open directly onto a living area, rather than having a vestibule or entrance hall. The doors are often surrounded by architectural plaster mouldings. Windows lack glass, instead they are open to the elements, but have barrotes, bars constructed of small turned wooden columns which allow the air to circulate without allowing entrance to the house. In the 19th century these wooden barriers were replaced by wooden shutters behind a wrought-iron grille.

The large windows are normally raised slightly from ground-level but can be flush to the pavement. Arched windows are also common, but are enclosed with radiating wooden slats. 19th-century houses tend to be built around a small courtyard with the rooms facing onto it.

=== Selected buildings ===
Buildings and plazas within the World Heritage Site include:

==== Iglesia Parroquial de la Santísima Trinidad ====
Above the plaza to the north-east stands the Church of the Holy Trinity (Iglesia Parroquial de la Santísima Trinidad). Construction began on the current church in the late 19th century and it was completed in 1892. It was built on the site of a previous 17th-century church that was destroyed during the 19th century by a cyclone which damaged a great many buildings in Trinidad.

The church contains an 18th-century wooden statue of Christ, "The Lord of the True Cross" ("El Señor de la Vera Cruz") which is an object of particular reverence in Trinidad. Originally destined for a church in Veracruz in Mexico, the ship carrying the statue was driven back to Trinidad three times by bad weather and was only able to make the journey after abandoning part of its cargo which included the statue of Christ. This was taken as divine intervention by the local population and the statue has been housed in the church ever since. Also housed within the building is a large Gothic revival altar dedicated to Our Lady of Mercy (Nuestra Señora de la Piedad).

The church has a Neoclassical façade, but little architectural attention was paid to the mostly concealed rear of the church. To the right of the church is a flight of steps leading to the Casa de la Musica (House of Music), a modern building constructed in a style similar to those nearby.

==== La Casa de los Conspiradores ====
Beyond the steps to the left of the Church is the House of the Conspirators (La Casa de los Consipiradores). This has a wooden balcony on one corner overlooking the square and is named because it was the former meeting place of the Cuban nationalist secret society La Rosa de Cuba (The Rose of Cuba). Further down the street is the Plazuela de la Trova, a small square surrounded by 18th-century houses including the Casa de la Trova which features wooden barrotes and is now a live music venue.

==== Palacio Brunet ====
To the left of the Church of the Holy Trinity stands the Brunet Palace (Palacio Brunet) which was built in 1812 by José Mariano Borrell y Padrón, head of the wealthy Borrell family. It takes its name from Count Nicolás de la Cruz Brunet y Muñoz, the husband of Borrell's daughter who inherited the house on Borrell's death. It now houses the Romantic Museum (Museo Romántico), mostly displaying objects that belonged to the Borrell family. The house has a central balustraded courtyard, and still features the original marble floor, frescoes, and neoclassical decoration. In the kitchen the original painted earthenware tiles can still be seen.

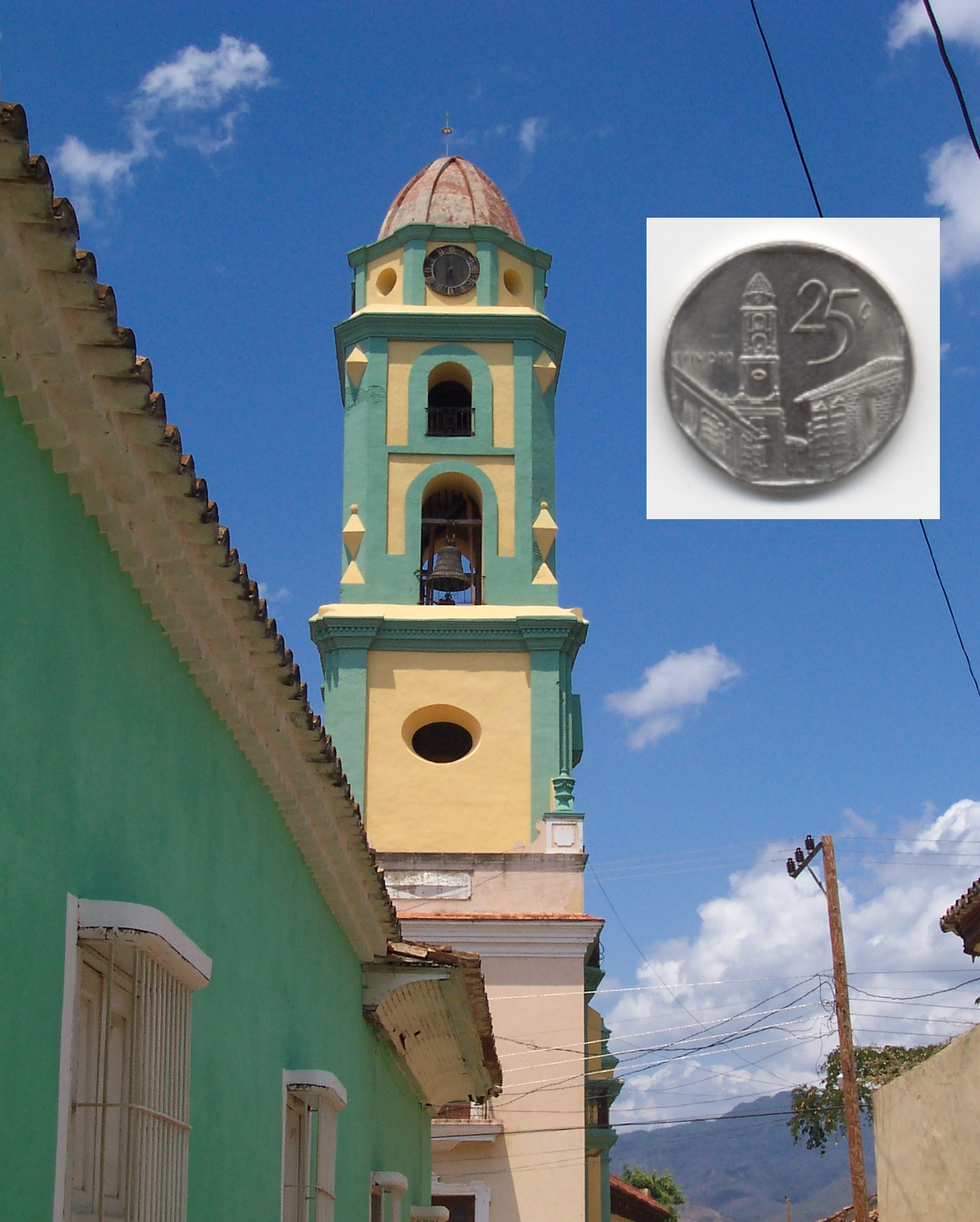
The 25 centavo convertible peso piece features a view of the bell tower of the Iglesia y Convento de San Francisco.

==== Iglesia y Convento de San Francisco ====
At the opposite end of Calle Hernández Echerri to the Palacio Brunet stands the Church and Monastery of Saint Francis (Iglesia y Convento de San Francisco) which houses the Museum of the Fight against Bandits (Museo de la Lucha contra Bandidos). The bandits in question were the counter-revolution forces that took refuge in the nearby Escambray Mountains (Sierra del Escambray) after the Cuban revolution and fought against Fidel Castro's government in the Escambray Revolt. Built in 1813 by Franciscan friars, the building became a parish church in 1848, and in 1895 was converted into a garrison for Spanish troops. The church fell into disrepair, and in 1920 much of it was demolished, leaving only the bell tower and a few nearby buildings. The 25 centavo (25-cent) convertible peso coin shows the bell tower of the church viewed from the corner of the Plaza Mayor on the obverse.

Below the Church of Saint Francis is Plazuela del Jigüe, a small square where Bartolomé de Las Casas celebrated the first Mass in Trinidad in 1514. The El Jigüe restaurant is unusually porticoed and decorated with hand-painted tiles.

==== Museo de Arqueología Guamuhaya ====
On the east side of the Plaza Mayor is the Museum of Guamuhaya Archeology (Museo de Arqueología Guamuhaya). Guamuhaya is the name for the local area in one of the languages of the indigenous Cubans, and the museum features Pre-Columbianb finds as well as articles from the time of the Spanish conquest. The building was constructed in the 18th century. Although who the original owner was is not clear, the building was purchased in the 19th century by Antonio Padrón, who added a portico facing the square and extended the roof. Alexander von Humboldt stayed with Padrón during his visit to Cuba, and his bust is displayed in the courtyard of the building.

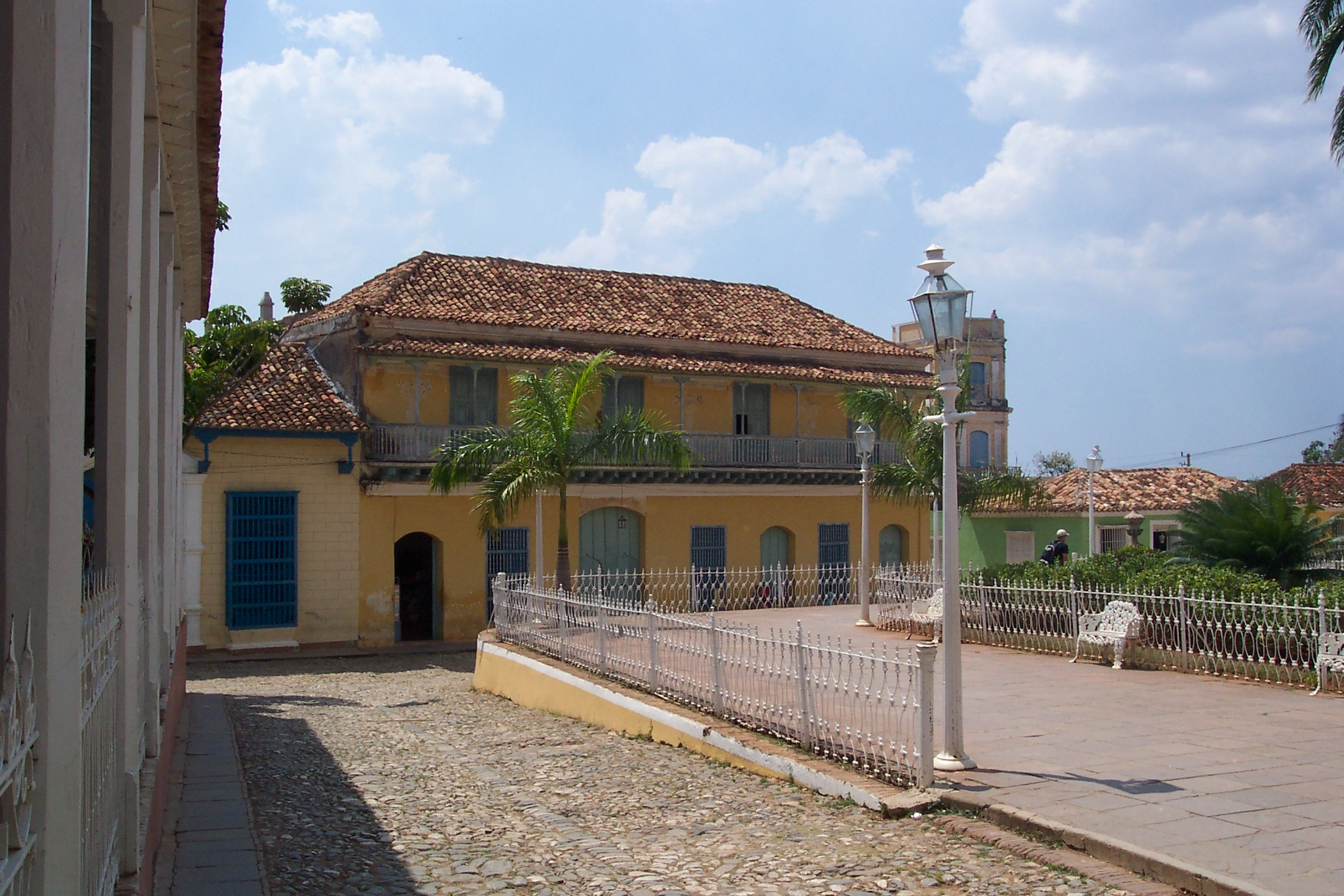
The Casa de Aldemán Ortiz shows many typical features of the Colonial houses of Trinidad.

==== Casa de los Sánchez Iznaga ====
On the other side of the square from the Museum of Guamuhaya Archeology is the House of the Sánchez Iznaga (Casa de los Sánchez Iznaga) which houses the Museum of Colonial Architecture (Museo de Arquitectura Colonial). This building was originally two houses in the 18th century, both owned by the sugar barons of the Sánchez Iznaga family (who owned the Manaca Iznaga estate in the nearby Valley de los Ingenios). The two houses, joined in the 19th century, show the typical grilled and shuttered windows, and feature an elegant portico with slim columns and a delicate wrought-iron balustrade, in contrast to the heavier pillars and ironwork of the Museum of Guamuhaya Archaeology on the other side of the square. Inside, the museum features items from Trinidad's architectural history (including an elaborate 19th-century shower) and details the history of building in the Colonial period.

==== Casa de Aldemán Ortiz ====
At the bottom of the square is the House of Mayor Ortiz (Casa de Aldemán Ortiz), built in 1809 by Ortiz de Zúñíga, who later became Mayor of Trinidad. The house shows many of the typical features of Trinidadian houses, including the large entrance door with two smaller doors cut into it, the barrotes covering the large windows and a terracotta tiled roof with large wooden supports. It is less typical in that it has a projecting balcony running along two sides. In January 2014, after years remodeling it became Bodeguita del Medio de Trinidad.

==== Palacio Cantero – Museo de Historia Municipal ====
One side of the Casa de Aldemán Ortiz faces onto the Calle Simón Bolívar; slightly down this road is the Cantero Palace (Palacio Cantero) one of the largest and most impressive of the houses surrounding the Plaza Mayor. Grander than most buildings nearby, it features a spacious entrance hall that opens on to a large galleried courtyard. Original frescoes survive on the plasterwork of the main hall, and a tower accessible from the courtyard gives views over the Plaza Mayor, the city of Trinidad, and the sea. The house is now used as the Municipal History Museum (Museo de Historia Municipal) which details the history of Trinidad.

Originally built in 1828 by Don Jose Mariano Borrell y Padron, one of the richest men in Trinidad, it was inherited by his son Jose Mariano Borrell y Lemus, Marques de Guaimaro and then bought in 1841 by Maria Monserrate Fernandez de Lara y Borrell, a niece of the older Jose Mariano. In 1842 Justo German Cantero y Owar-Anderson, a local doctor, married Pedro Iznaga's widow, Maria Monserrate, and it was the home of the Cantero/Fernandez de Lara family until the late 19th century.

== See also ==
- Trinidad, Cuba
- List of World Heritage Sites in Cuba
- Spanish colonial architecture in Cuba

== Gallery ==
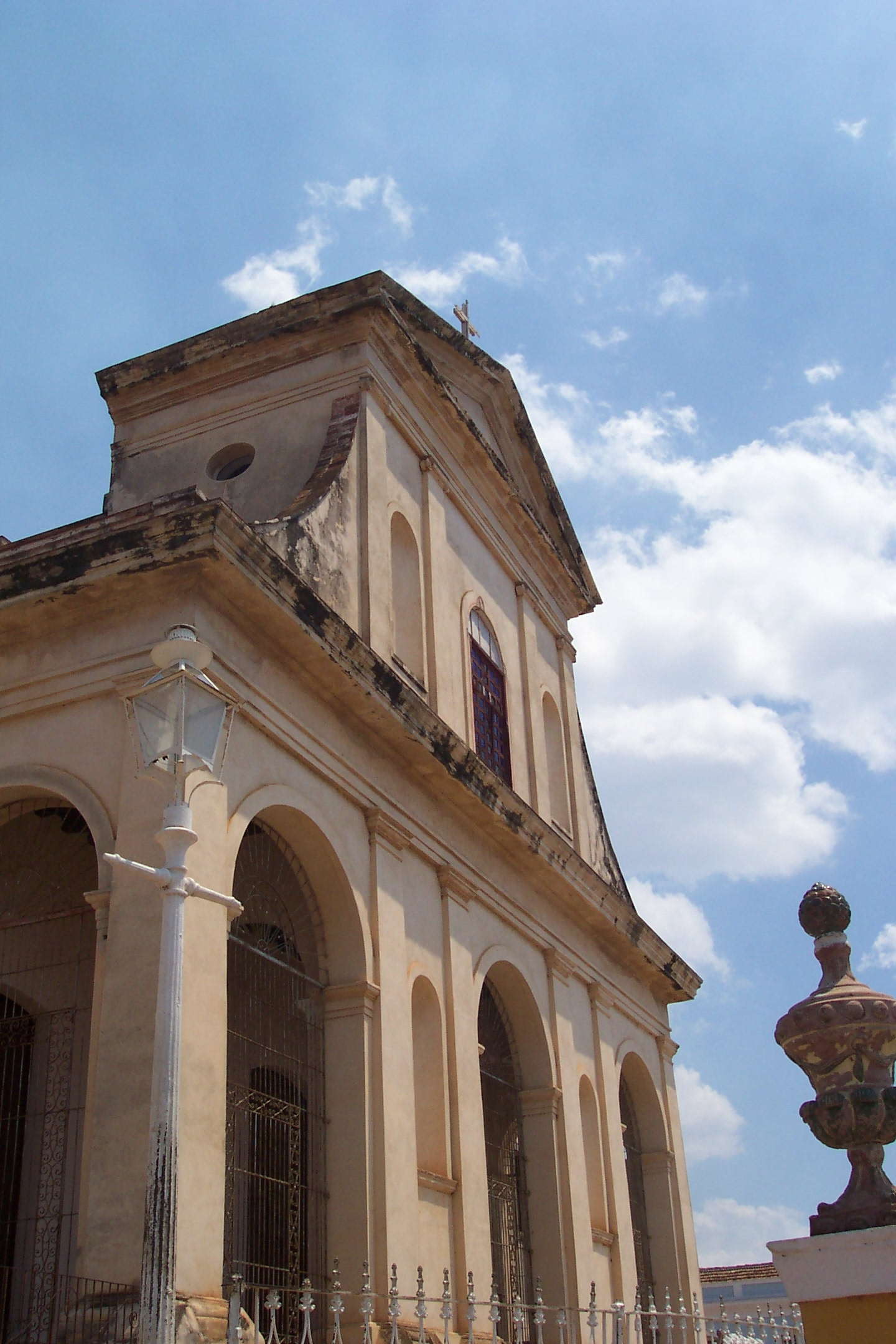
Church of the Holy Trinity—Iglesia Parroquial de la Santísima Trinidad.

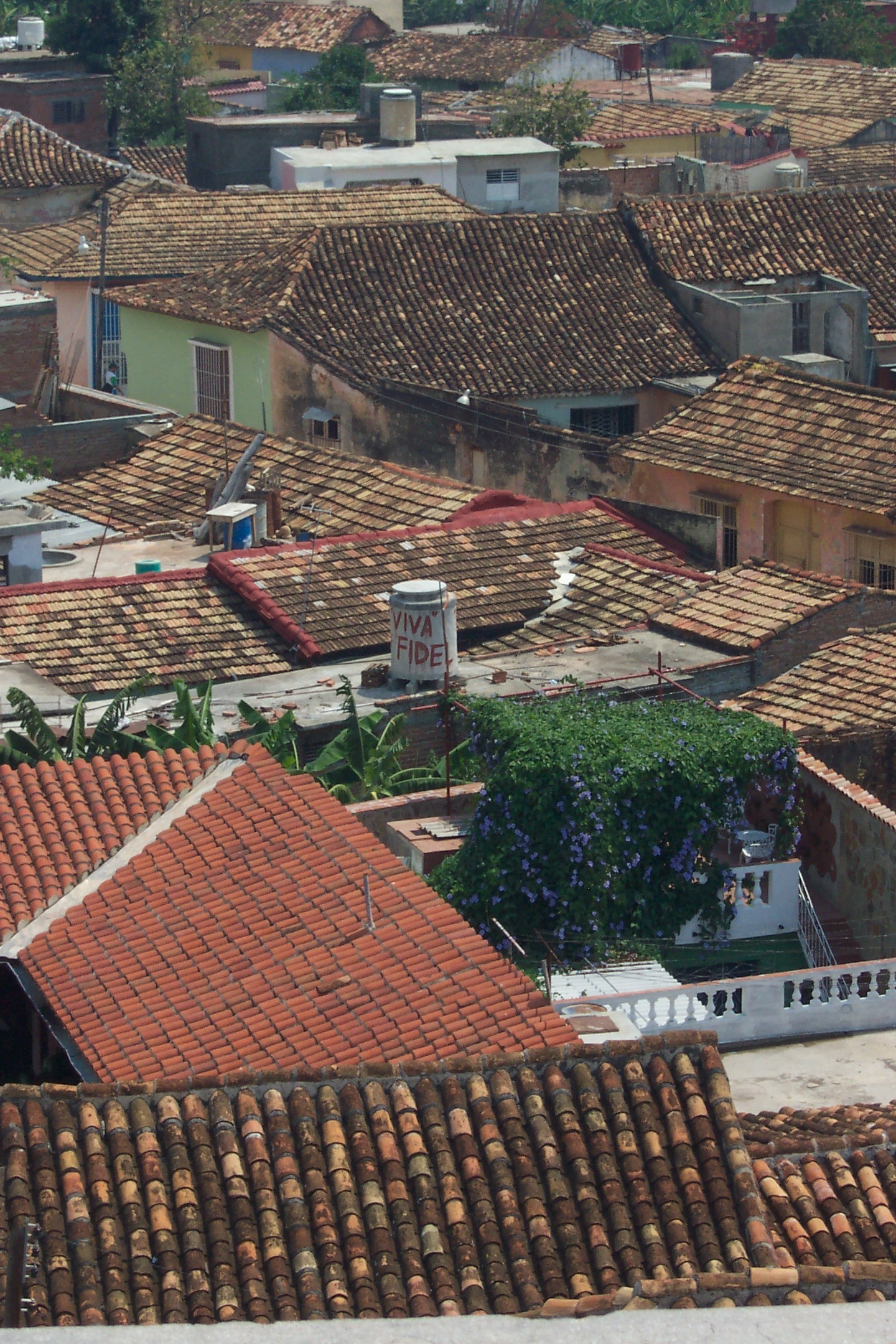
Modern propaganda appears among the Colonial houses

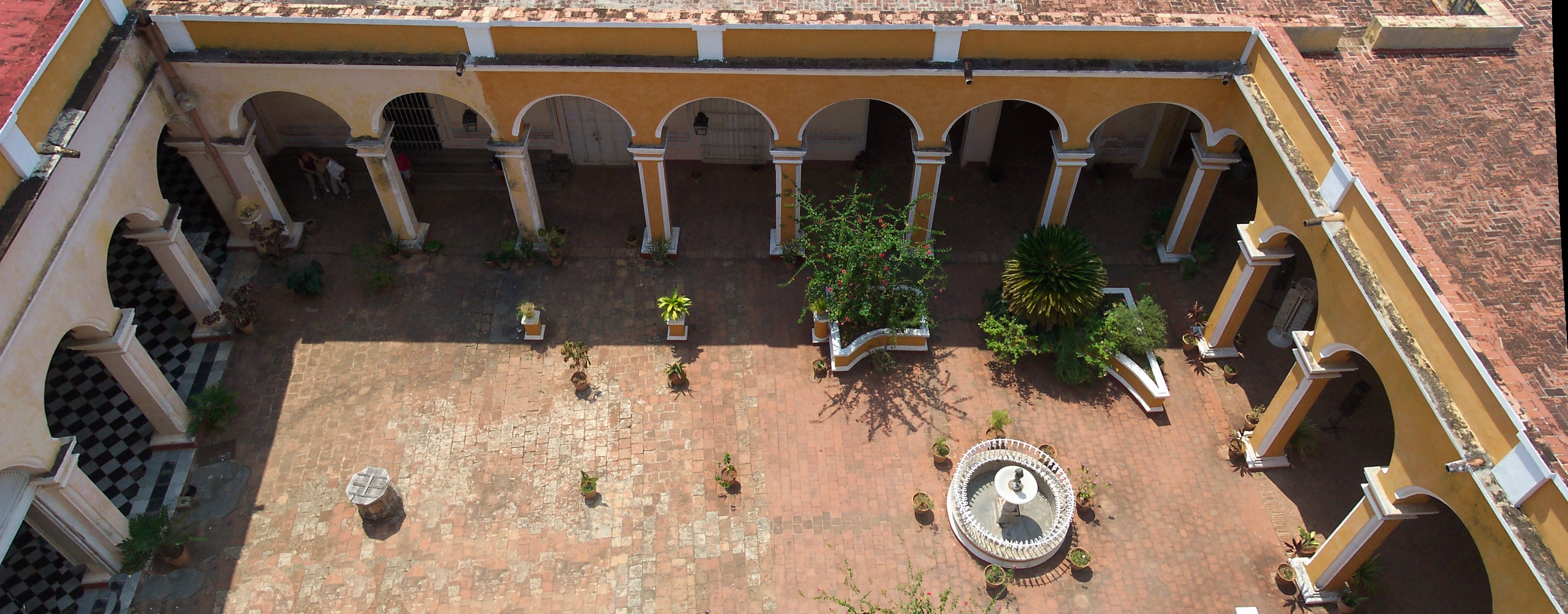
Courtyard of the Palacio Cantero — Museo de Historia Municipal.

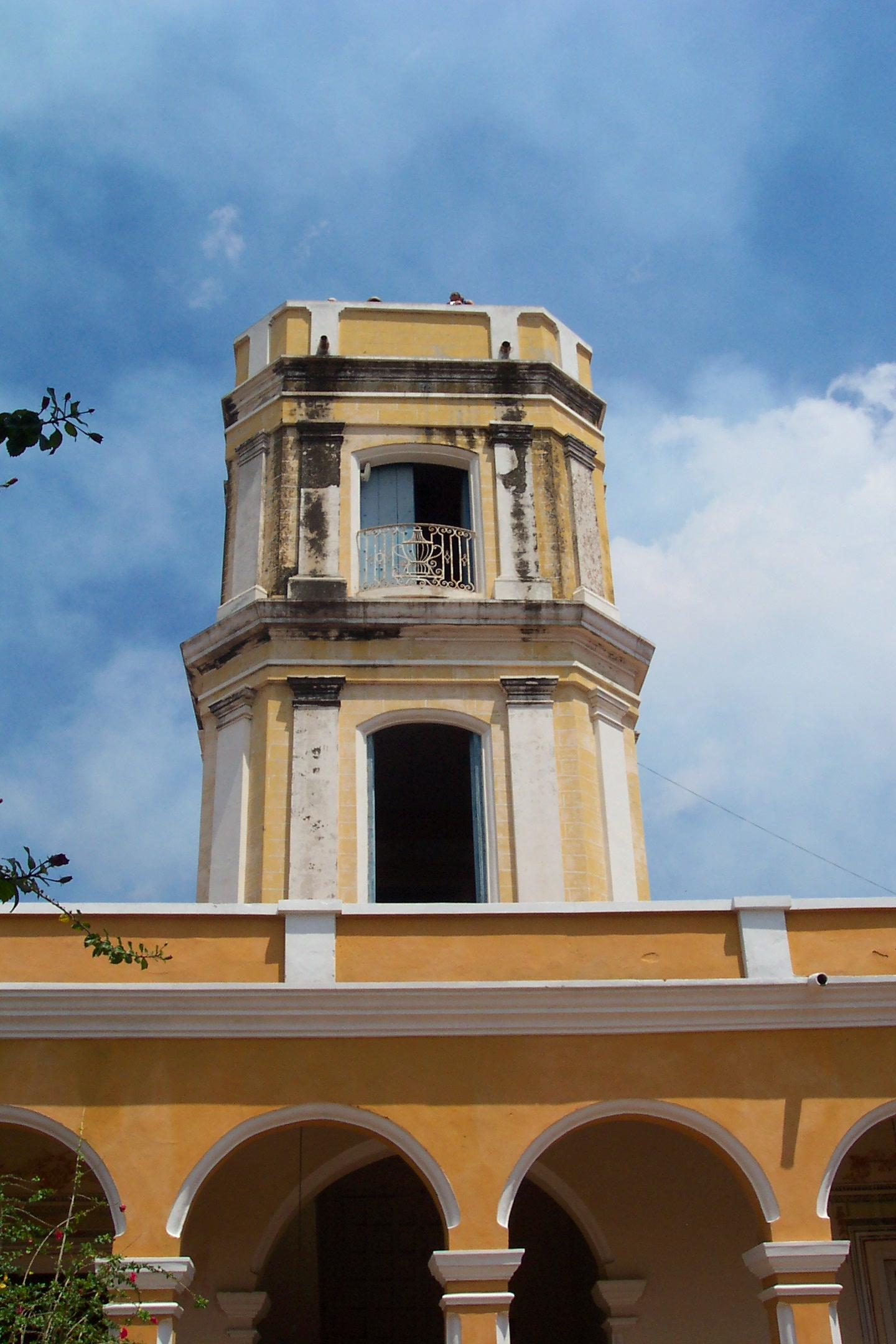
Watchtower of the Palacio Cantero
