= List of Intangible Cultural Heritage elements in Cuba =

Location of Cuba

The United Nations Educational, Scientific and Cultural Organization (UNESCO) defines intangible cultural heritage elements as non-physical traditions and practices performed by a people. As part of a country's cultural heritage, they include celebrations, festivals, performances, oral traditions, music, and the making of handicrafts. The term intangible cultural heritage is formally established by the Convention for the Safeguarding of the Intangible Cultural Heritage, which was drafted in 2003 and took effect in 2006. The inscription of new heritage elements on UNESCO's Intangible Cultural Heritage Lists for protection and safeguarding is determined by the Intergovernmental Committee for the Safeguarding of Intangible Cultural Heritage, an organization established by the Convention. Cuba ratified the Convention on 29 May 2007. It served on the Intangible Cultural Heritage Committee twice, from 2008 to 2012, and from 2016 to 2020.

National lists are required by the Convention for the further nomination of elements to the UNESCO lists.

== Intangible Cultural Heritage of Humanity ==
UNESCO's Intangible Cultural Heritage of Humanity consists of three lists: the Representative List of the Intangible Cultural Heritage of Humanity, the List of Intangible Cultural Heritage in Need of Urgent Safeguarding, and the Register of Good Safeguarding Practices. Cuba only has elements inscribed on the Representative.

† Transnational element

=== Representative List ===
This list aims to represent the intangible cultural heritage of Cuba worldwide and bring awareness to its significance.

Intangible Cultural Heritage elements recognized by UNESCO
Name	Media	Year	No.	Description
La Tumba Francesa	Guantánamo, house of the Tumba francesa	2008	00052	
Rumba in Cuba, a festive combination of music and dances and all the practices associated	Cuban rumba dancers at the workers square in Camagüey, Cuba	2016	01185	
Punto		2017	01297	
Festivity of Las Parrandas in the centre of Cuba	2007's "Goat" district float in Camajuani slowly passing in front of the colonial structure of the local theatre	2018	01405	
Knowledge of the light rum masters	A bottle of light rum from the company Santiago de Cuba	2022	01724	
Bolero: identity, emotion and poetry turned into song † (Note: Shared with Mexico)	Pepe Sánchez (guitar, left) and Emiliano Blez (tres) with three singers (standing)	2023	01990	
Traditional knowledge and practices for the making and consumption of cassava bread † (Note: Shared with the Dominican Republic, Honduras, Haiti, and Venezuela)		2024	02118	
The practice of Cuban Son	The Sexteto Habanero in 1920: three men are standing, two with guitars and three men are sitting on chairs. There is also a child sitting on the floor, the men are dressed in suits.	2025	02299	

== See also ==
- List of World Heritage Sites in Cuba
- Culture of Cuba
- Tourism in Cuba
