= Alberto Delgado Airport =

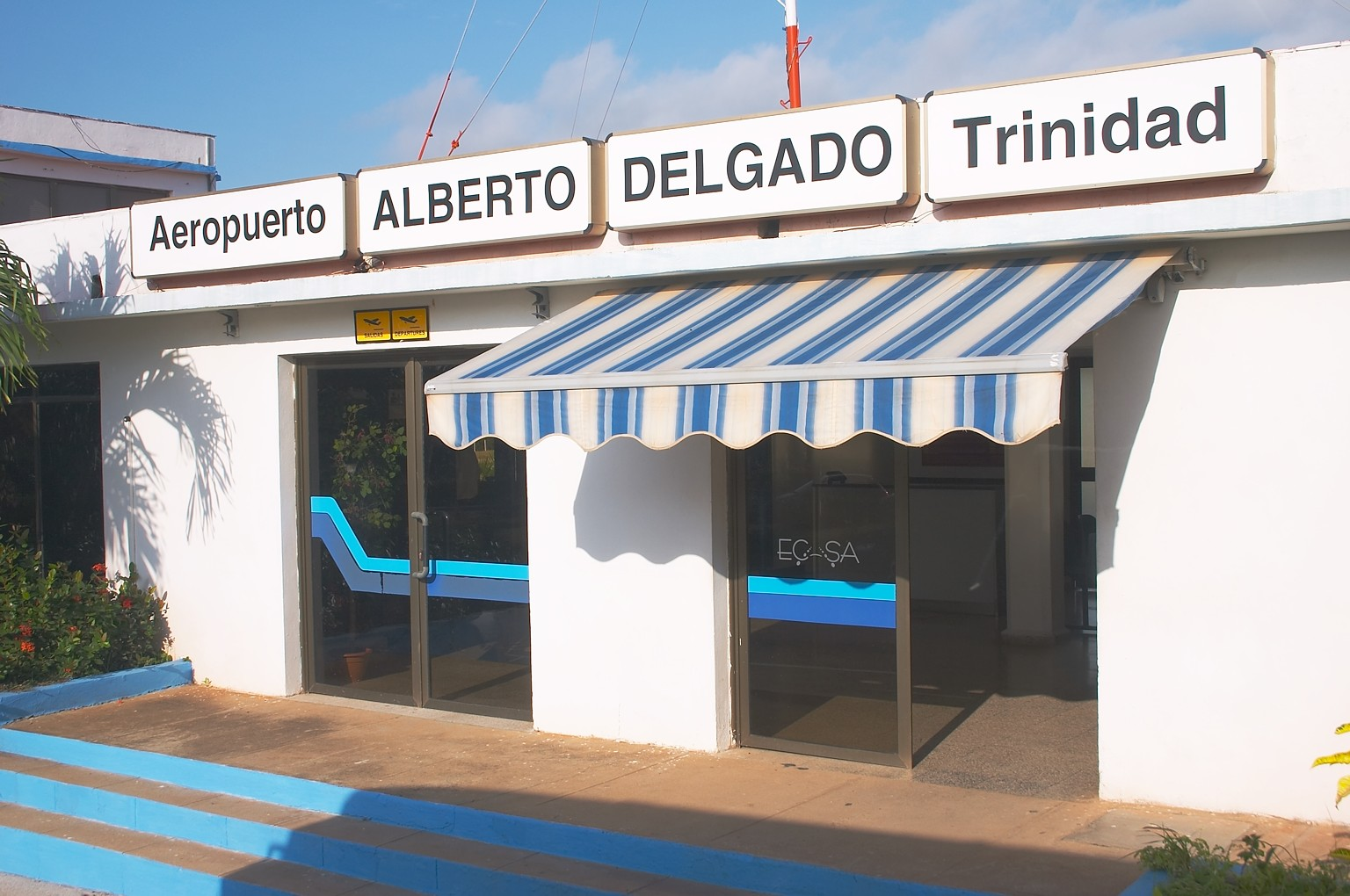
- IATA: TND; ICAO: MUTD

Summary
- Airport type: Public
- Serves: Trinidad, Cuba
- Elevation AMSL: 38 m / 125 ft
- Coordinates: 21°47′18″N 79°59′50″W

Map
- Location in Cuba

Runways
Direction	Length		Surface
Direction	m	ft	Surface
06/24	1,801	5,909	Asphalt
- Source: Aeronautical chart

Alberto Delgado Airport (Spanish: Aeropuerto "Alberto Delgado") (IATA: TND, ICAO: MUTD) is an airport serving Trinidad, a city in the province of Sancti Spíritus, in Cuba.

== Facilities ==
The airport is situated at an elevation of 38 m (125 ft) above mean sea level. It has one runway, designated 06/24 with an asphalt surface measuring 1,801 m × 30 m (5,909 ft × 98 ft).

== See also ==
- Casilda (Trinidad)
- Valle de los Ingenios
