= Casilda (Trinidad) =

- Village
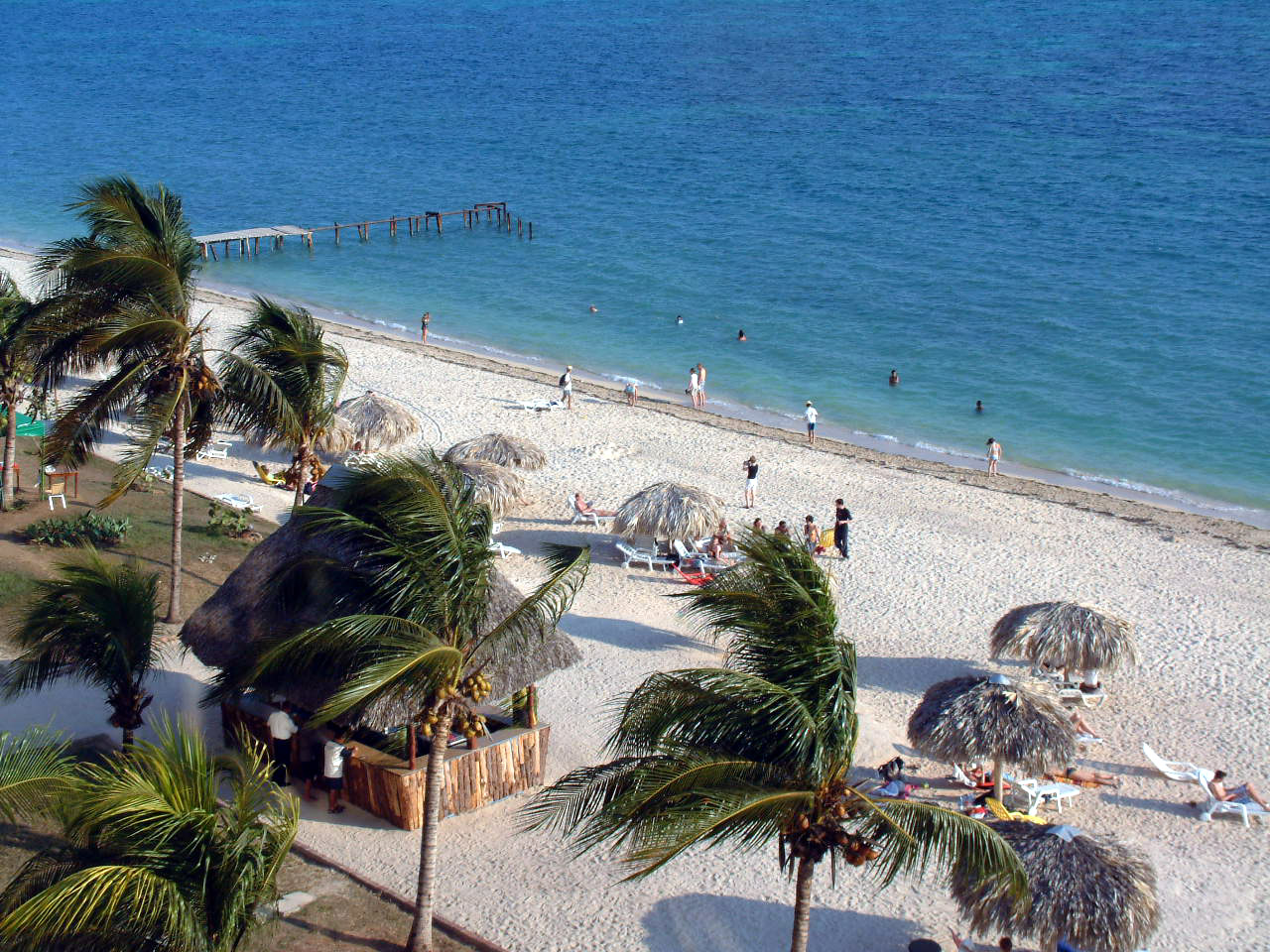
- View of Playa Ancón

- Location of Casilda in Cuba
- Coordinates: 21°45′37.44″N 79°59′25.8″W
- Country: Cuba
- Province: Sancti Spíritus
- Municipality: Trinidad
- Founded: 1808
- Elevation: 10 m (33 ft)
- Time zone: UTC-5 (EST)

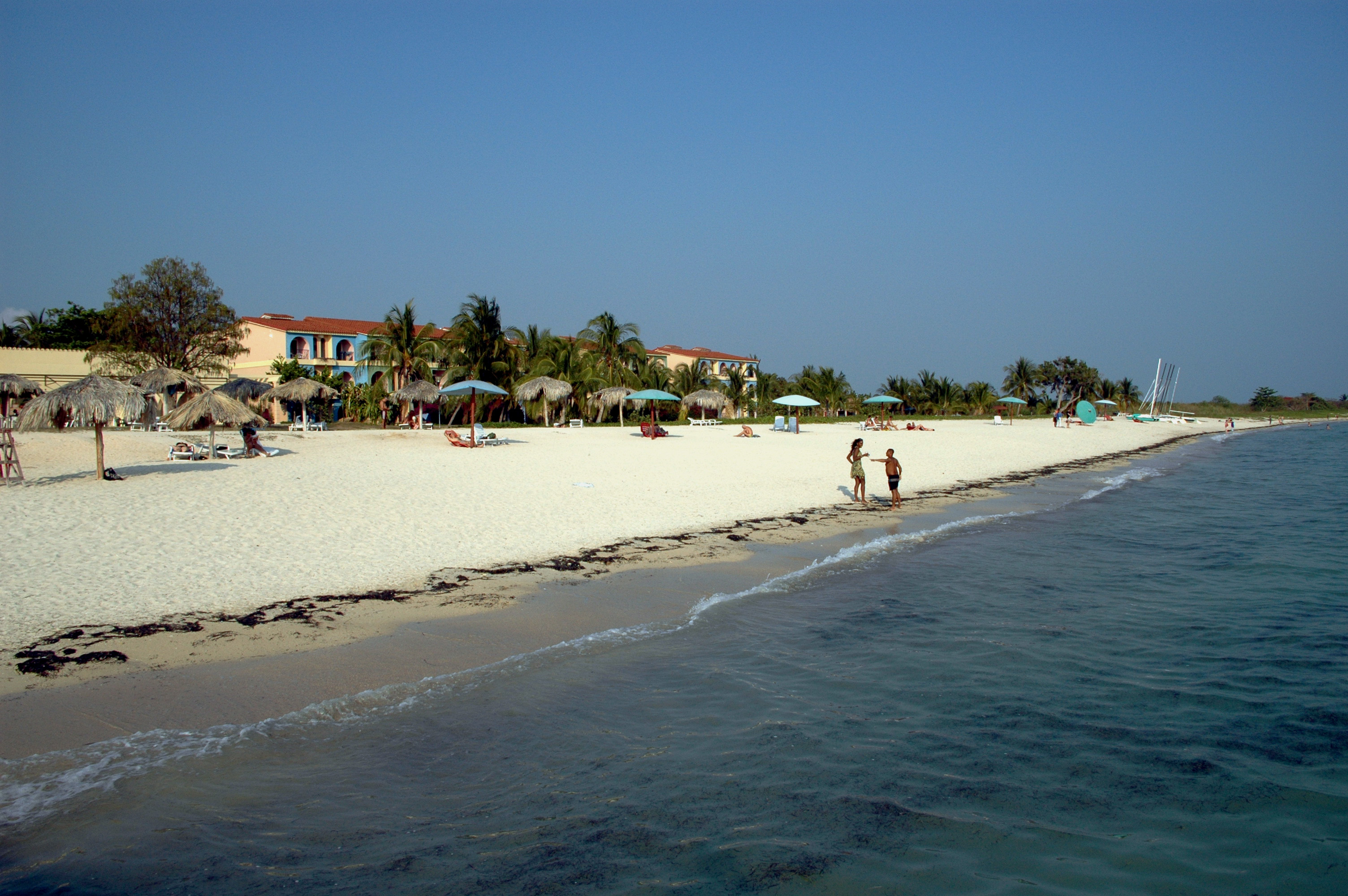
The coastline of Playa Ancón

Casilda is a Cuban village and consejo popular ("people's council", i.e. hamlet) of the municipality of Trinidad, Sancti Spíritus Province.

Casilda is a seaside resort, due to the presence of tourist beaches such as Playa Ancón.

== History ==
The village was founded in 1808 by Andrés Valdés Pino, in the vicinity of a farm named Peralta.

Casilda's population in 1943 was 1,986.

== Geography ==
Casilda is located south of Trinidad (5 km ) by the Gulf of Ana María, on the Caribbean coast. It lies on the Casilda Bay, enclosed by the Ancón Peninsula, on which are located several hotels of Playa Ancón.

Casilda's main road is Calle Real, and the Carretera a Ancón (also called Paseo Agramonte) links it to the peninsula. The village is 30 km from Valle de los Ingenios, 75 from Sancti Spíritus, 86 from Cienfuegos, and 102 from Santa Clara.

== Transport ==
Casilda is the southern terminus of the railway line which links Placetas and Fomento to Trinidad, has a small harbor, and is 4 km from Alberto Delgado Airport.

The state highway "Circuito Sur" (CS), crossing Trinidad and linking it to Cienfuegos and Sancti Spíritus, is 5 km from Casilda's centre.

== See also ==
- List of cities in Cuba
- Municipalities of Cuba
- Topes de Collantes
