= Trinidad, Cuba =

Municipality in Sancti Spíritus, Cuba

Trinidad Villa de la Santísima Trinidad
- Municipality
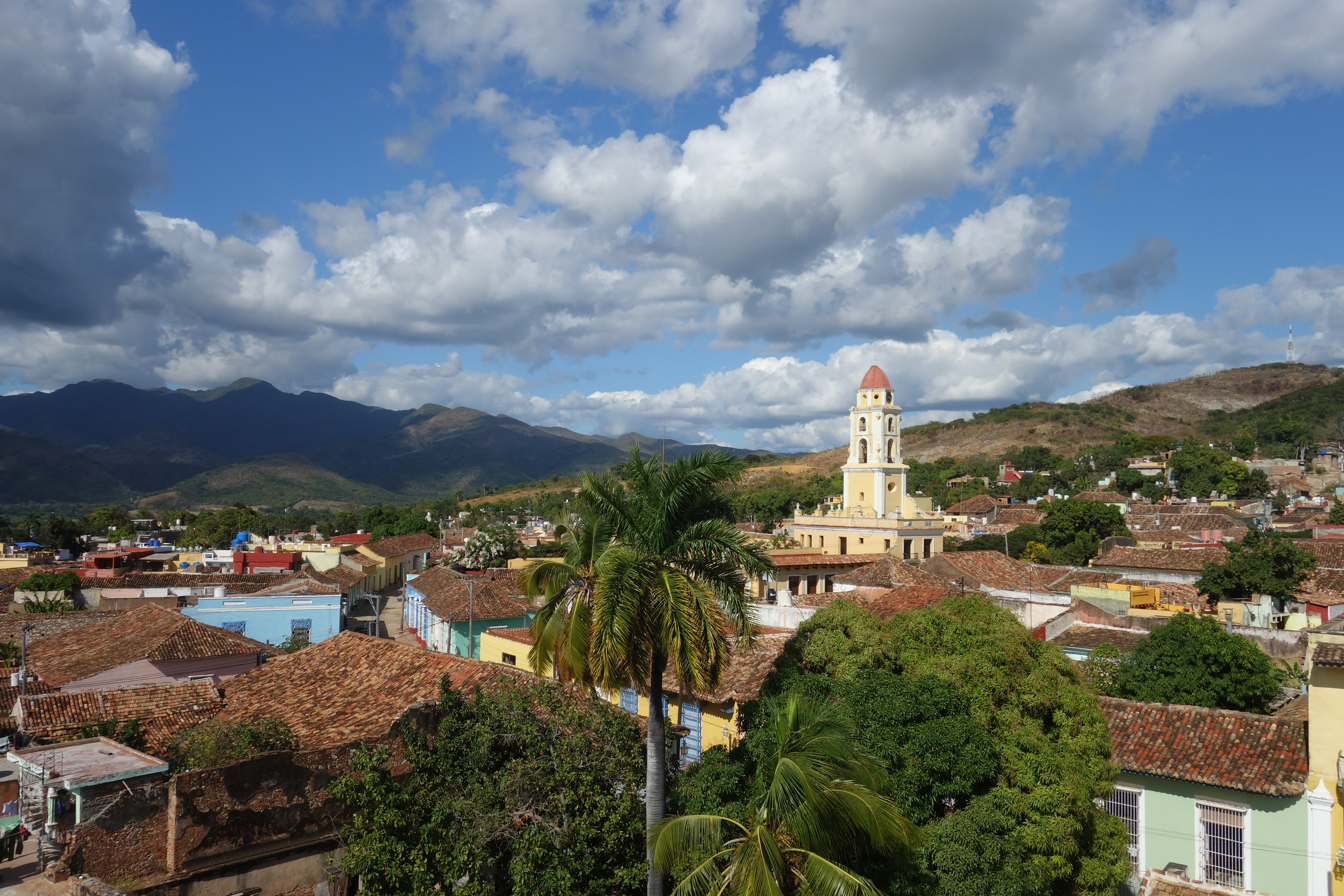
- The Iglesia y Convento de San Francisco in Trinidad

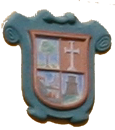
- Flag Coat of arms

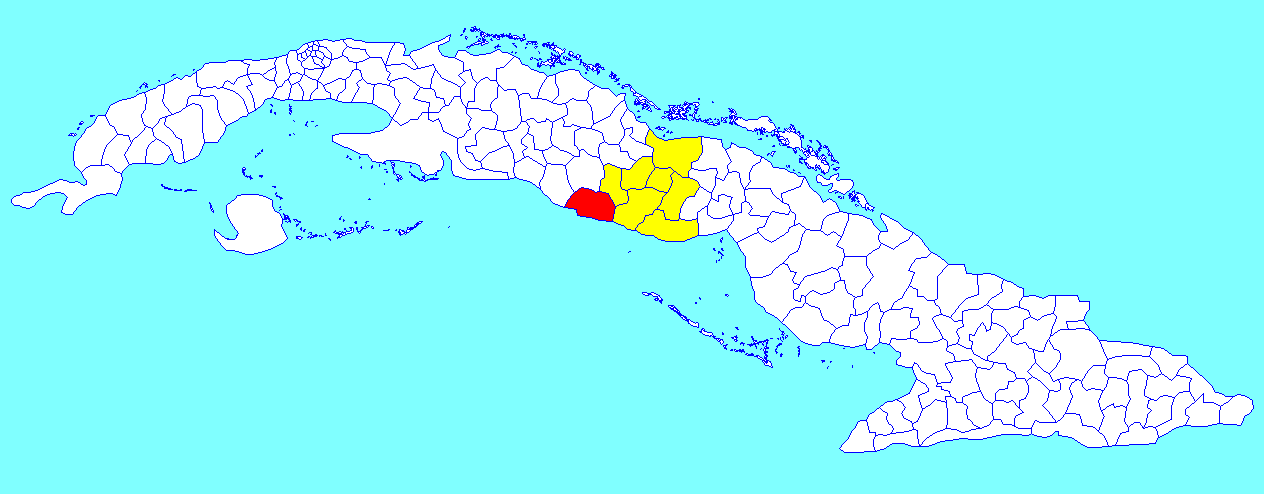
- Trinidad municipality (red) within Sancti Spíritus Province (yellow) and Cuba
- Coordinates: 21°48′15″N 79°58′59″W
- Country: Cuba
- Province: Sancti Spíritus
- Founded: December 23, 1514

Area
  - Total: 1,155 km^{2} (446 sq mi)
- Elevation: 80 m (260 ft)

Population (2022)
  - Total: 76,500
  - Density: 66.2/km^{2} (172/sq mi)
- Time zone: UTC-5 (EST)
- Area code: +53-41
- Website: https://trinidad.gob.cu/

UNESCO World Heritage Site
- Official name: Trinidad and the Valle de los Ingenios
- Type: Cultural
- Criteria: iv, v
- Designated: 1988 (12th session)
- Reference no.: 460
- Region: Latin America and the Caribbean

Trinidad (Spanish pronunciation: [tɾiniˈðað]; lit. 'Trinity') is a town in the province of Sancti Spíritus, central Cuba. Together with the nearby Valle de los Ingenios, it has been a UNESCO World Heritage Site since 1988, because of its historical importance as a center of the sugar trade in the 18th and 19th centuries. Trinidad is one of the best-preserved cities in the Caribbean from the time when the sugar trade was the main industry in the region.

== History ==
Trinidad was founded on December 23, 1514, by Diego Velázquez de Cuéllar under the name Villa de la Santísima Trinidad.

Hernán Cortés recruited men for his expedition from Juan de Grijalva's home in Trinidad, and Sancti Spíritus, at the start of his 1518 expedition. This included Pedro de Alvarado and his five brothers. After ten days, Cortes sailed, the alcayde Francisco Verdugo failing to prevent Cortes from leaving, despite orders from Diego Velázquez.

The Narvaez Expedition landed at Trinidad in 1527 en route to Florida. Caught in a hurricane, the expedition lost two ships, twenty horses and sixty men to the violent storm.

== Geography ==
The town proper is divided into the barrios (quarters) of Primero, Segundo and Tercero. The whole municipality counts the consejos populares (wards) of Centro, Zona Monumento, Armando Mestre, La Purísima, Casilda, Federación Nacional de Trabajadores Azucareros (FNTA), Condado, Topes de Collante, San Pedro, Manacas - Iznaga, Algarrobo, Pitajones, and Caracusey.

== Economy ==
Nowadays, Trinidad's main industry is tobacco processing. The older parts of town are well preserved, as the Cuban tourism industry sees benefit from tour groups. In contrast, some parts of town outside the tourist areas are very run down and in disrepair, especially in the centre. Tourism from Western nations is a major source of income in the city.

=== Tourism ===
The city attracts visitors for its well‑preserved colonial architecture, cobblestone streets, vibrant plazas, and local museums, as well as nearby beaches and natural areas.

== Culture ==
=== Town ===
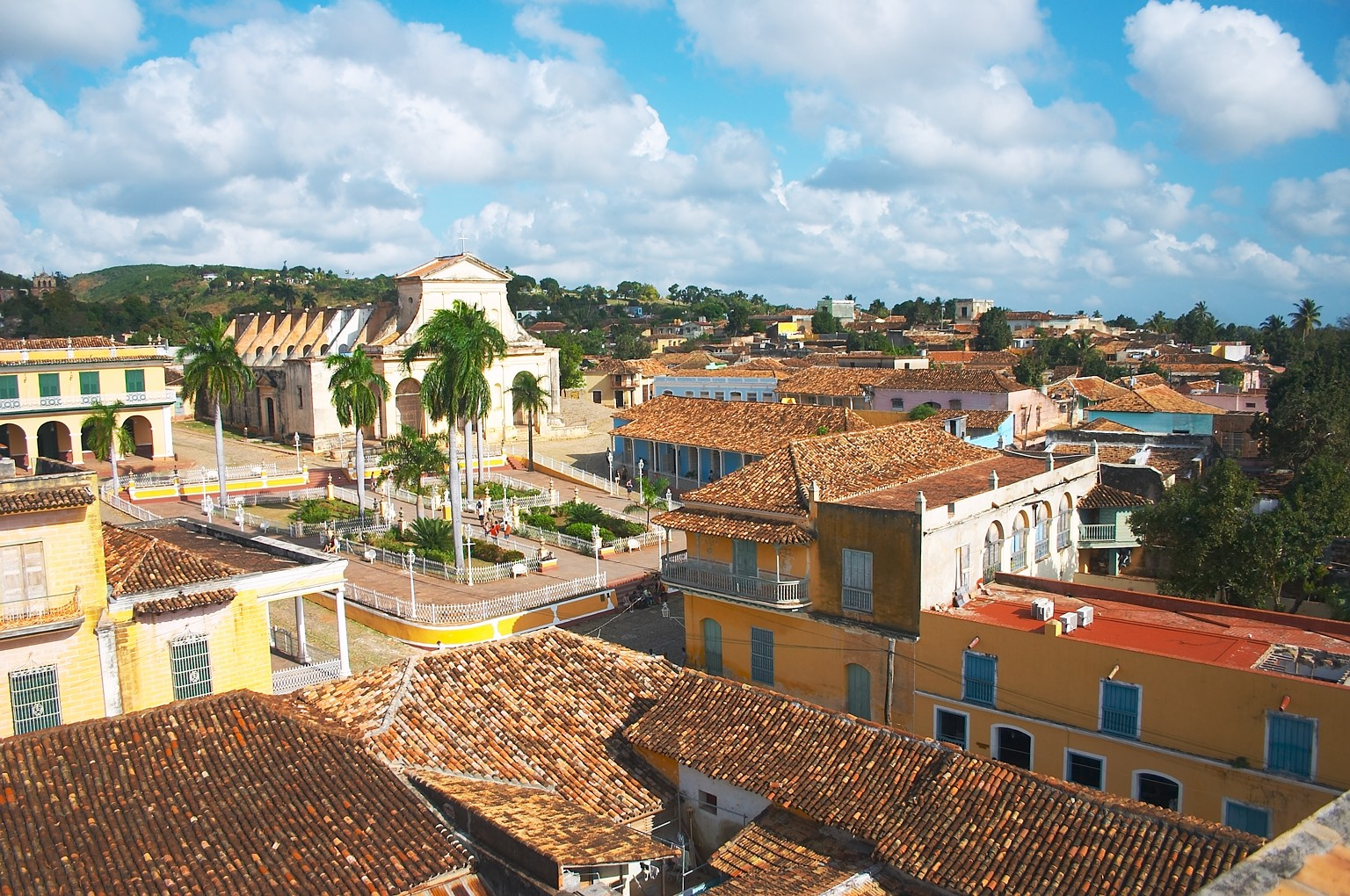
View of colonial Trinidad

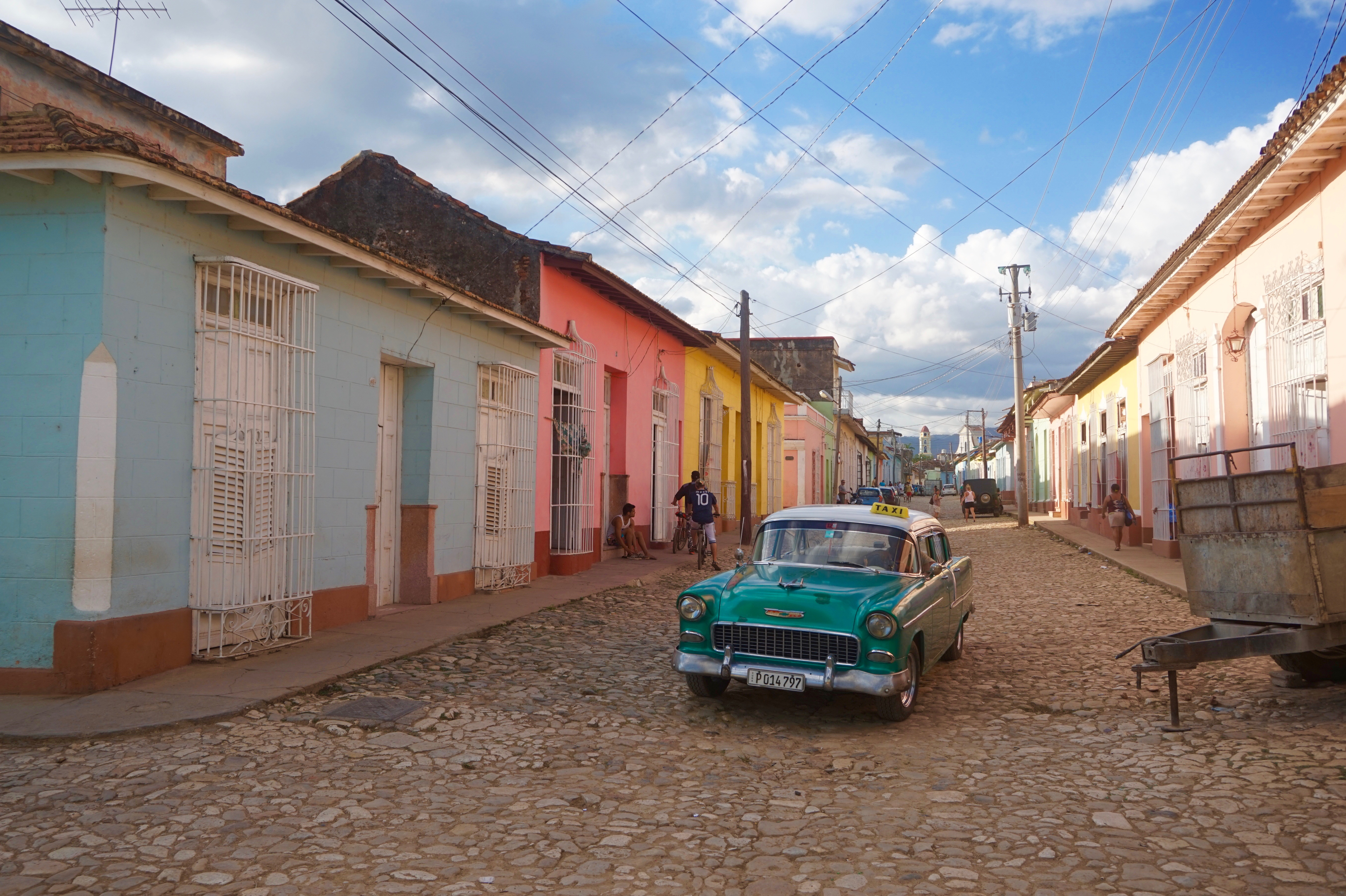
Taxi in the city center

Plaza Mayor

The Plaza Mayor of Trinidad is a plaza and an open-air museum of Spanish Colonial architecture. Only a few square blocks in size, the historic plaza area has cobblestone streets, houses in pastel colors with wrought-iron grilles, and colonial-era edifices such as the Santísima Trinidad Cathedral and Convento de San Francisco. The Municipal History Museum is in town also.

Music

There are several casas de musica, including one next to the cathedral in Plaza Major. There are also discothèques, including one in the ruins of a church; another is in a large cave formerly used as a war time hospital.

=== Region ===
Sugar mills

The Valley of the Sugar Mills—Valle de los Ingenios, also a World Heritage Site, has around 70 historic sugar cane mills. They represent the importance of sugar to the Cuban economy since the 18th century.

The valley has la Torre Iznaga, a 45 metres (148 ft) tower built by Alejo Iznaga Borrell in 1816.

Coasts and beaches

20 kilometres (12 mi) from the city is Topes de Collantes, one of Cuba's premier ecotourism centres. Another attraction is the Casilda Bay, which attracts both snorkelers and divers.

A nearby islet has pristine beaches. Ancón Beach—Playa Ancón, is a white sand beach and was one of the first new resorts to be developed in Cuba following the 1959 revolution. Along the Ancón Peninsula are three hotels: Hotel Costa Sur (South Coast Hotel), Hotel Ancón, and Brisas Trinidad del Mar.

== Demographics ==
In 2022, the municipality of Trinidad had a population of 76,500. With a total area of 1,155 km^{2} (446 sq mi), it has a population density of 63.6/km^{2} (165/sq mi).

== Photo gallery ==
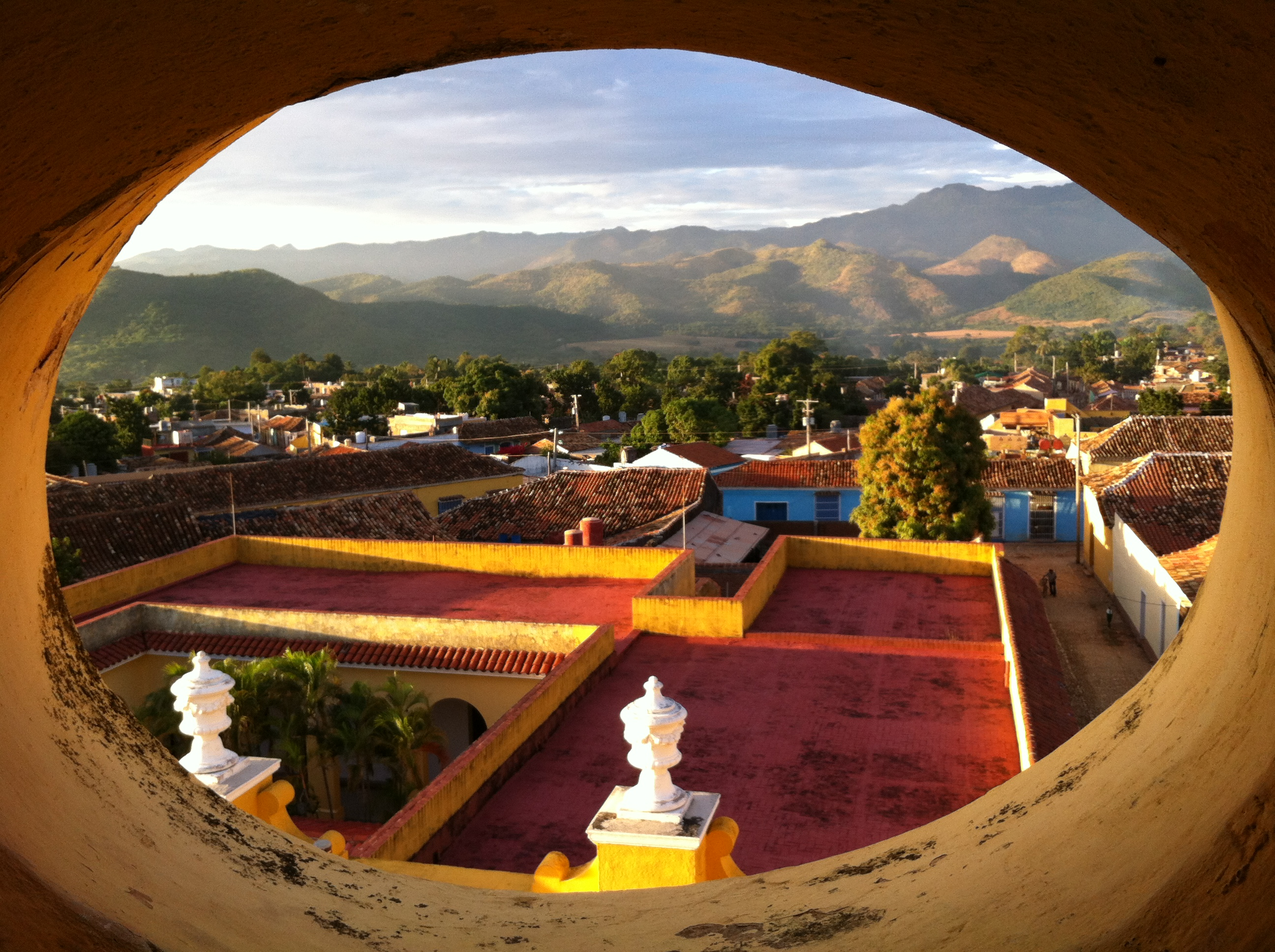
A view from Saint Francis of Assini, Trinidad, Cuba

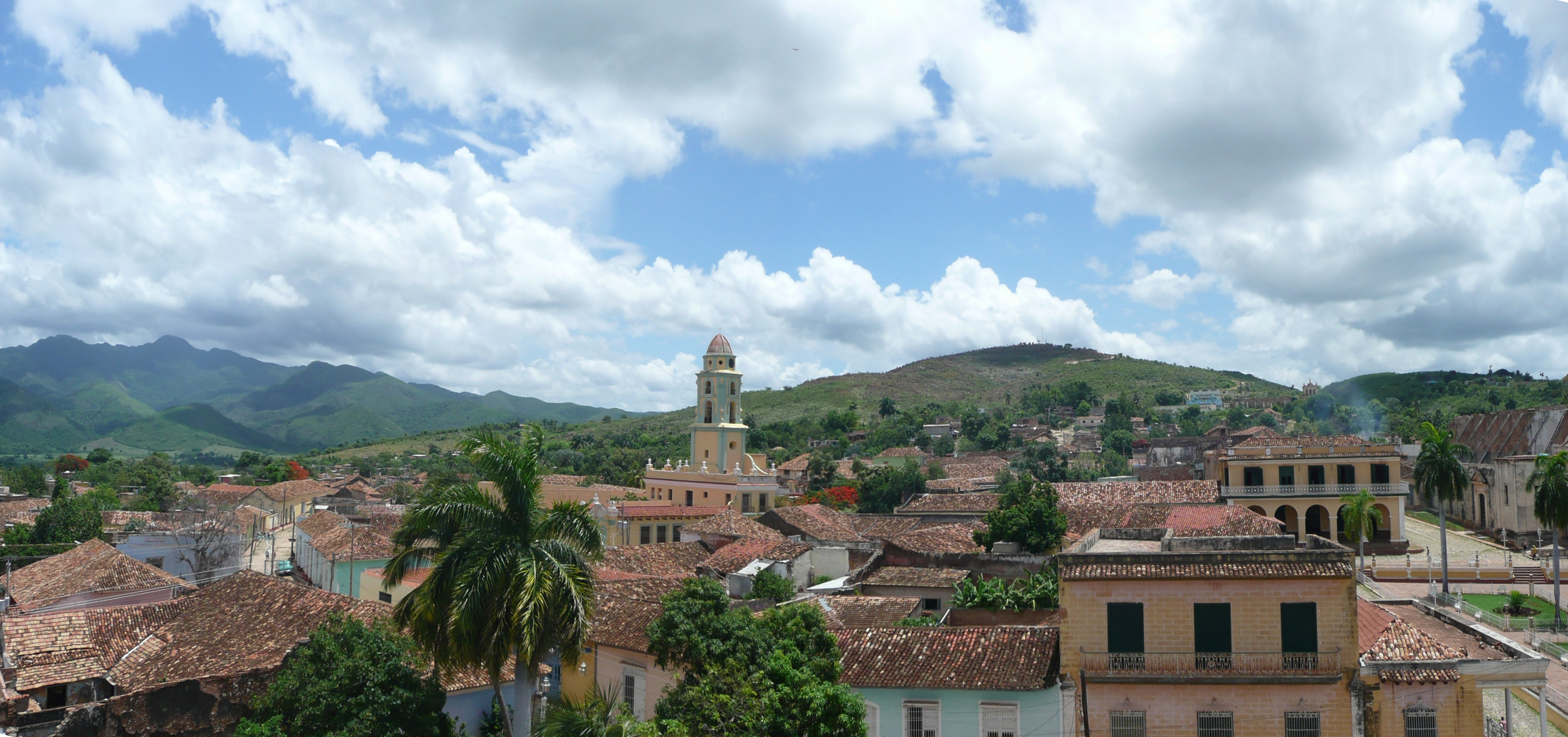
Plaza Mayor and Iglesia y Convento de San Francisco

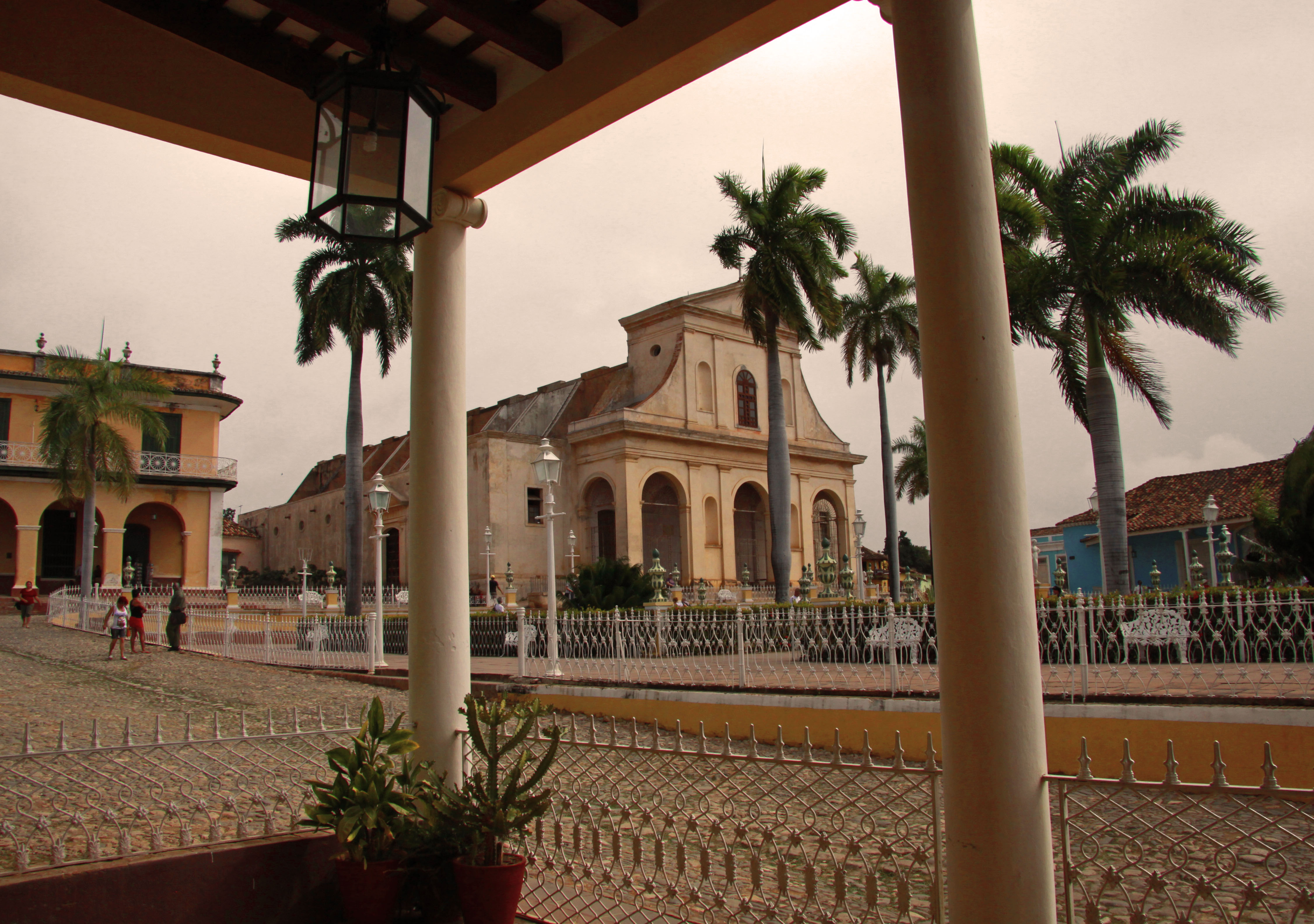
Plaza Mayor

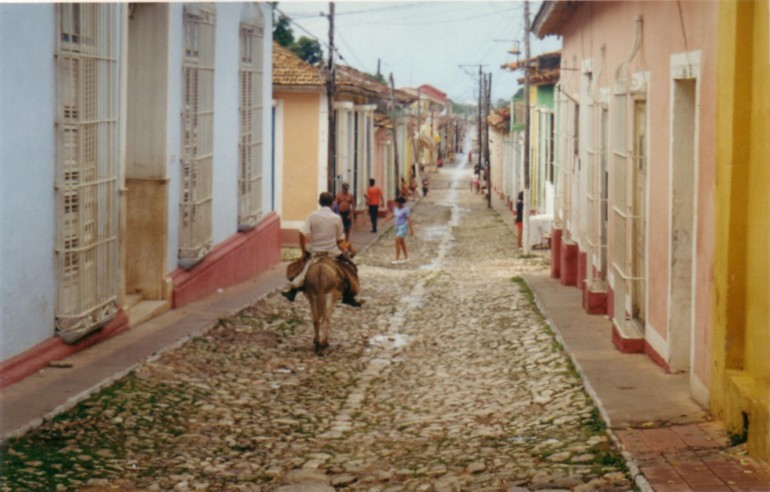
A typical colonial street in October 2000.

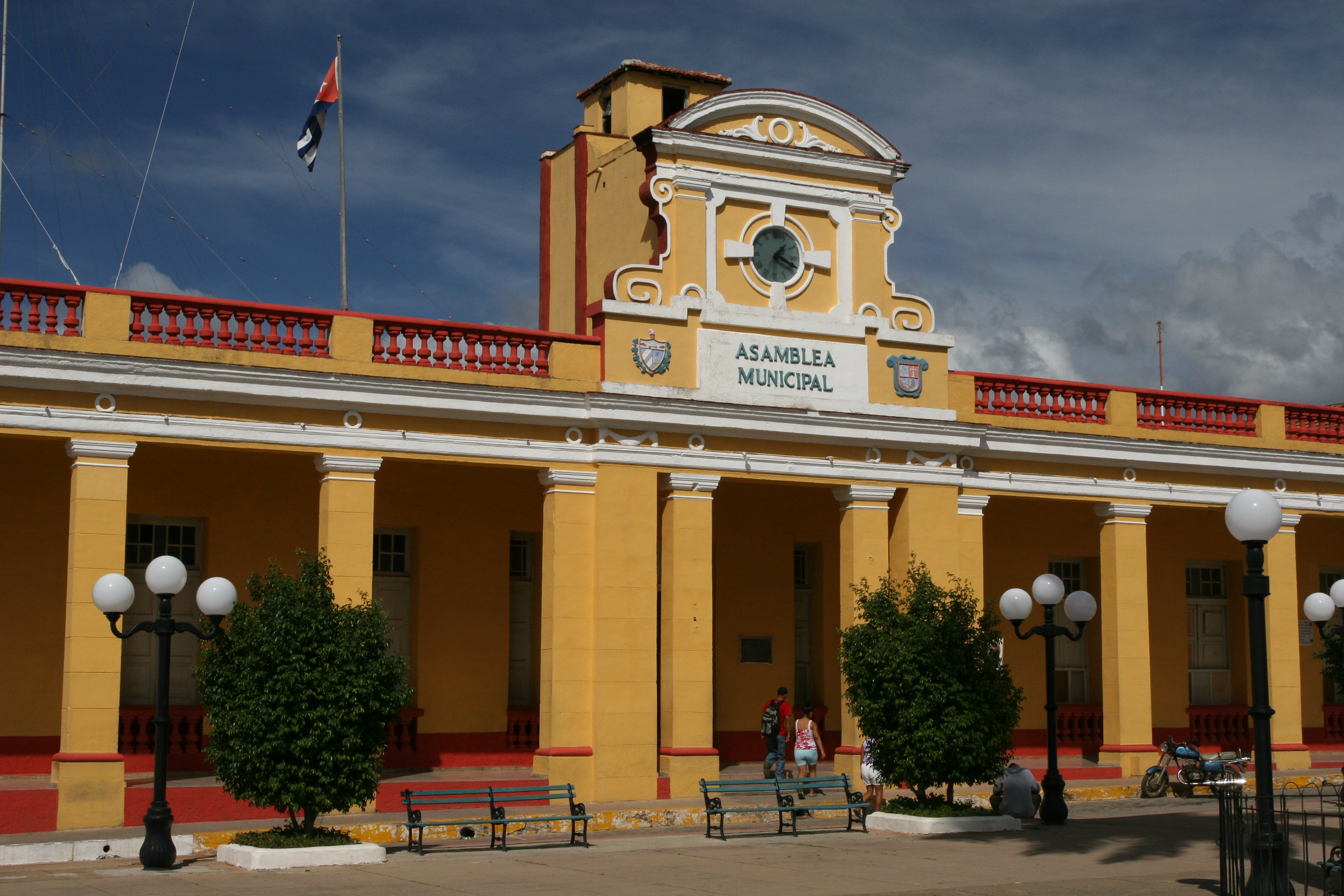
Town hall

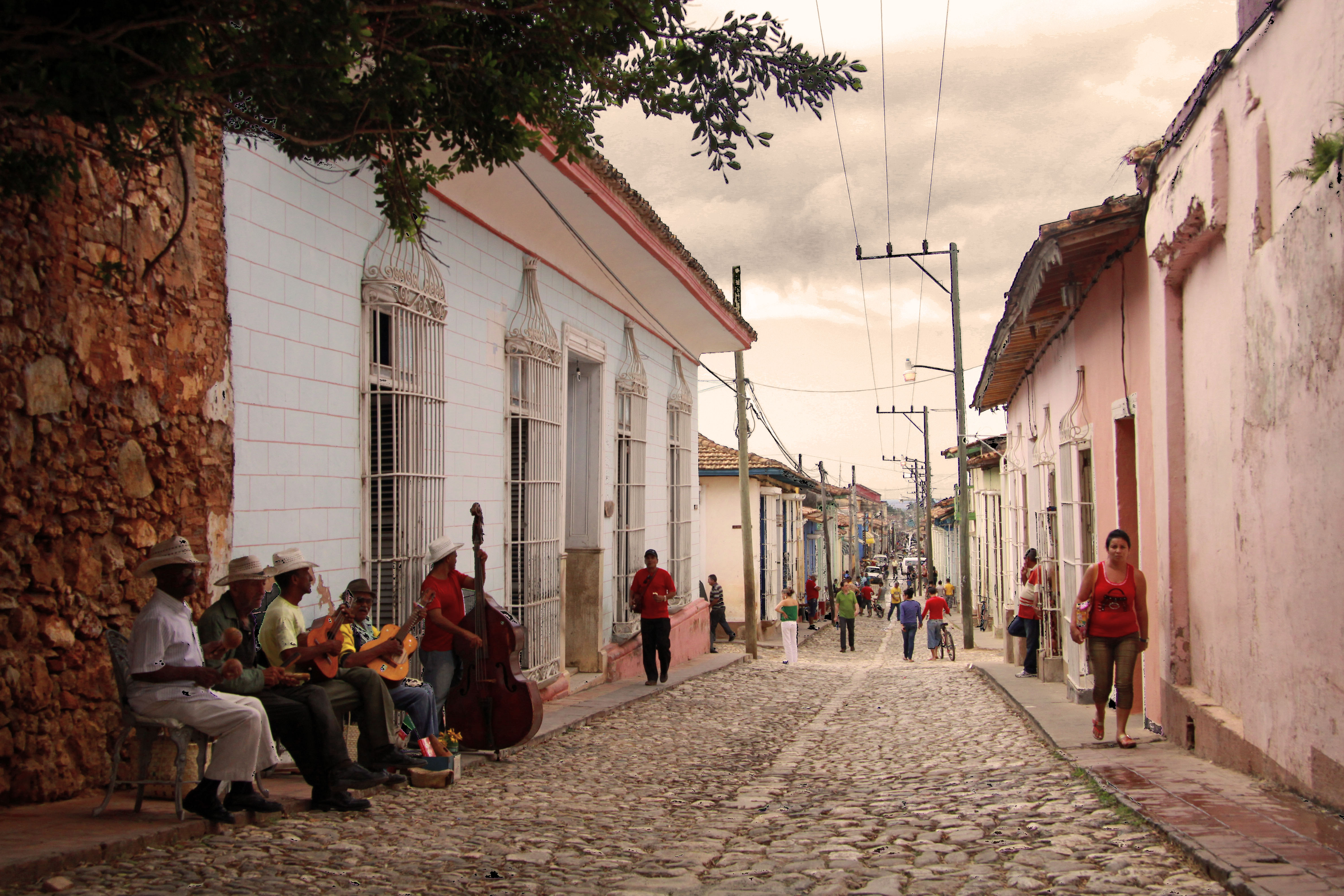

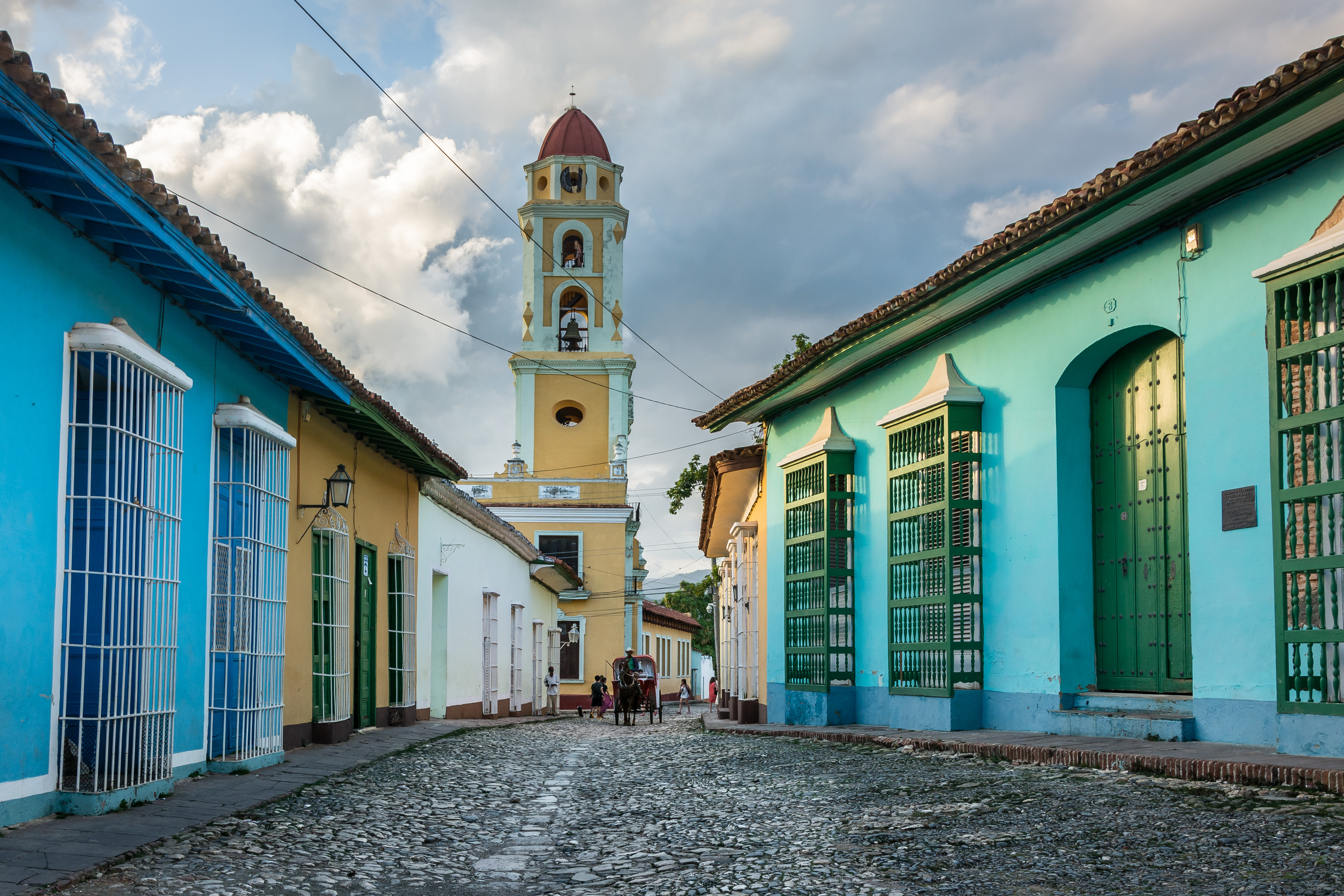

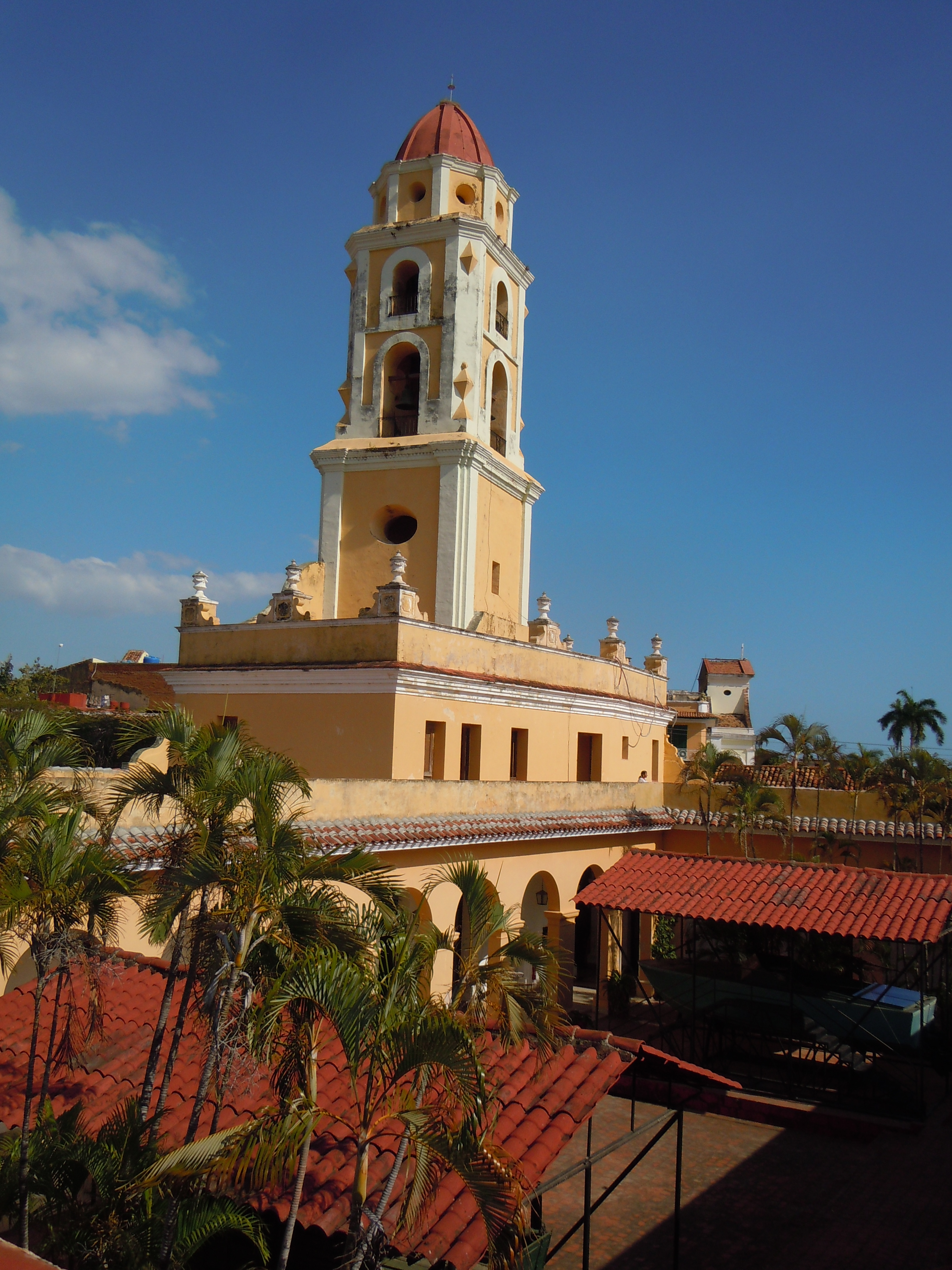
Tower of the Convento de San Francisco

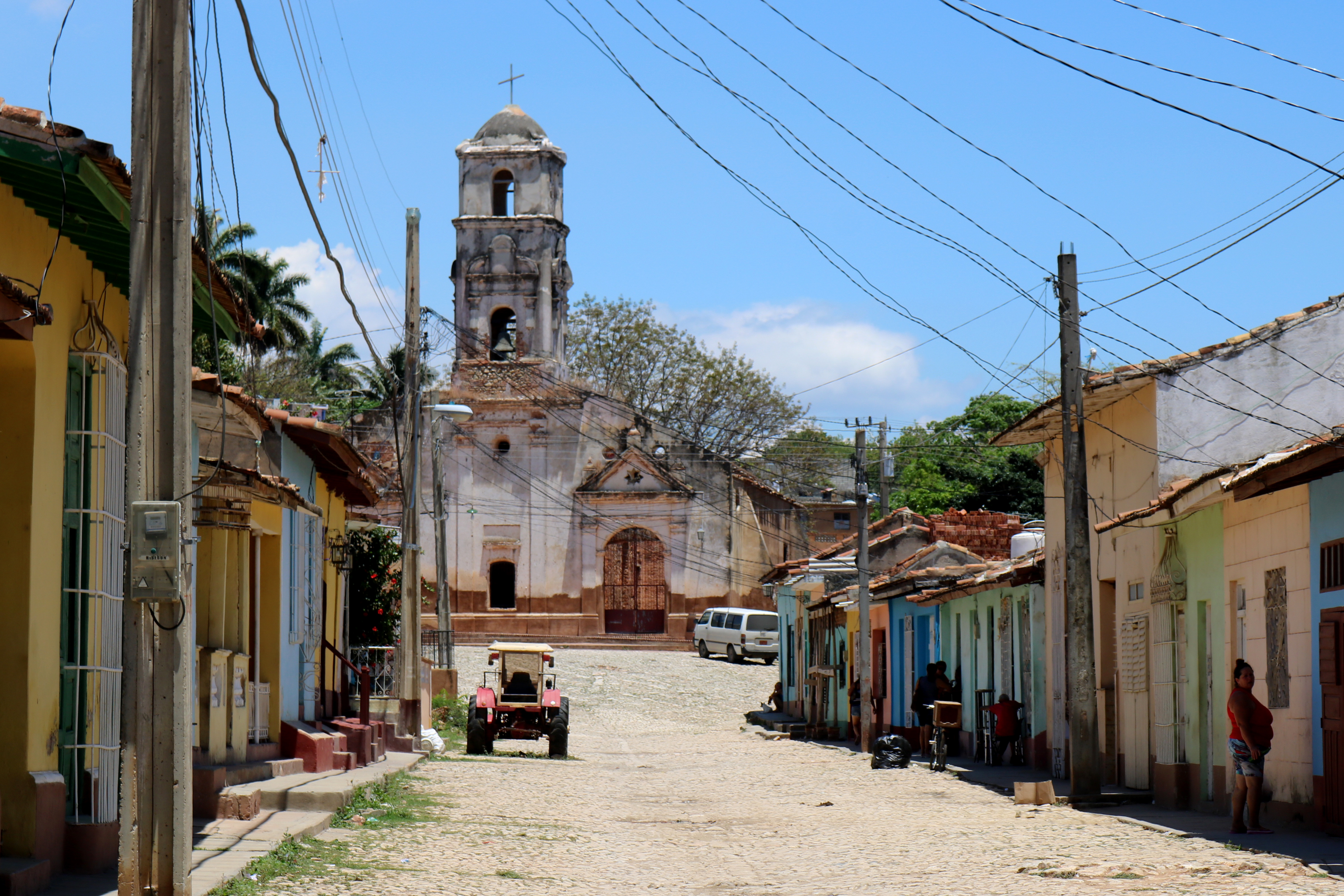
Church of Santa Ana

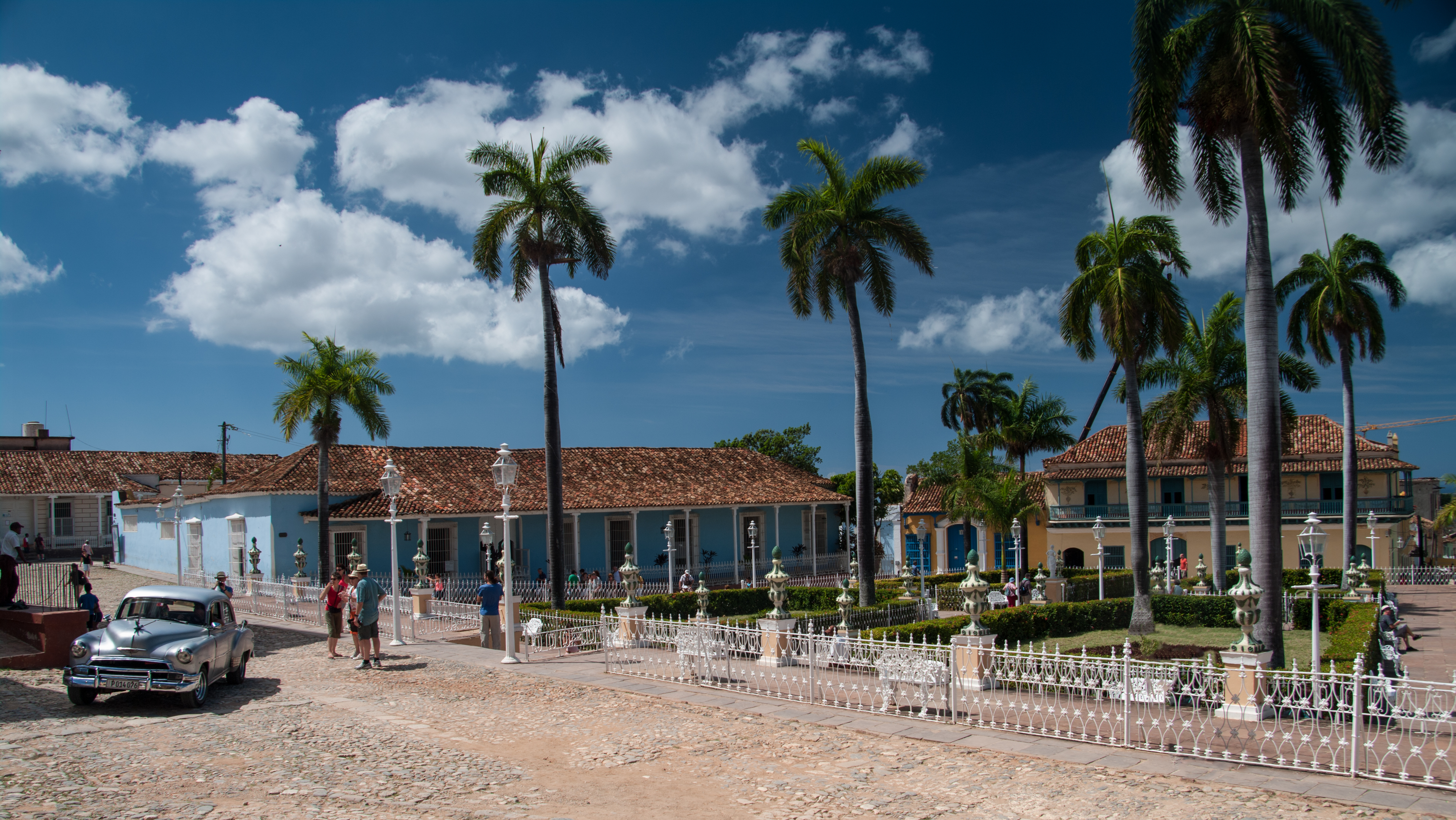

== Notable people ==
- Alexandre Arrechea
- Julio Emilio Carretero
- Tomás San Gil
- Manolo Urquiza

== See also ==
- Alberto Delgado Airport
- Valle de los Ingenios
- List of cities in Cuba
- Municipalities of Cuba
