= Valle de los Ingenios =

Valley in Cuba

- Valley of the Sugar Mills
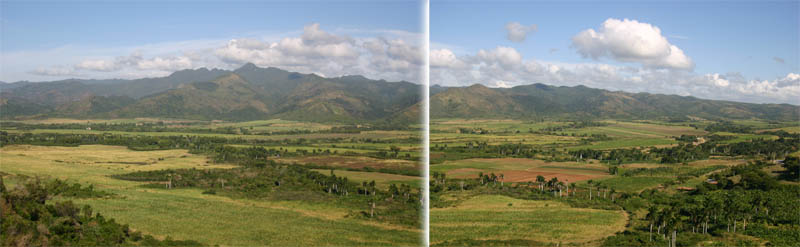
- Valle de los Ingenios

- Location within Cuba
- Length: 12 kilometres (7.5 mi)
- Area: 270 km^{2} (100 sq mi)

Geography
- Population centers: Outside of Trinidad, Cuba
- Coordinates: 21°50′29″N 79°51′59″W
- Interactive map of Valle de los Ingenios

UNESCO World Heritage Site
- Official name: Trinidad and the Valle de los Ingenios
- Type: Cultural
- Criteria: iv, v
- Designated: 1988 (12th session)
- Reference no.: 460
- Region: Latin America and the Caribbean

Valle de los Ingenios, also named Valley de los Ingenios or Valley of the Sugar Mills, is a series of three interconnected valleys about 12 kilometres (7.5 mi) outside of Trinidad, Cuba. The three valleys, San Luis, Santa Rosa, and Meyer, were a centre for sugar production from the late 18th century until the late 19th century. At the peak of the industry in Cuba there were over fifty sugar cane mills in operation in the three valleys, with over 30,000 slaves working in the mills and on the sugar cane plantations that surrounded them.

In 1988, Valle de los Ingenios and neighbouring Trinidad were declared a World Heritage Site by UNESCO, because of its testimony to the early sugar trade industry. The entire area covers 270 km^{2} (100 sq mi) and includes the sites of over 70 former sugar mills.

== Overview ==
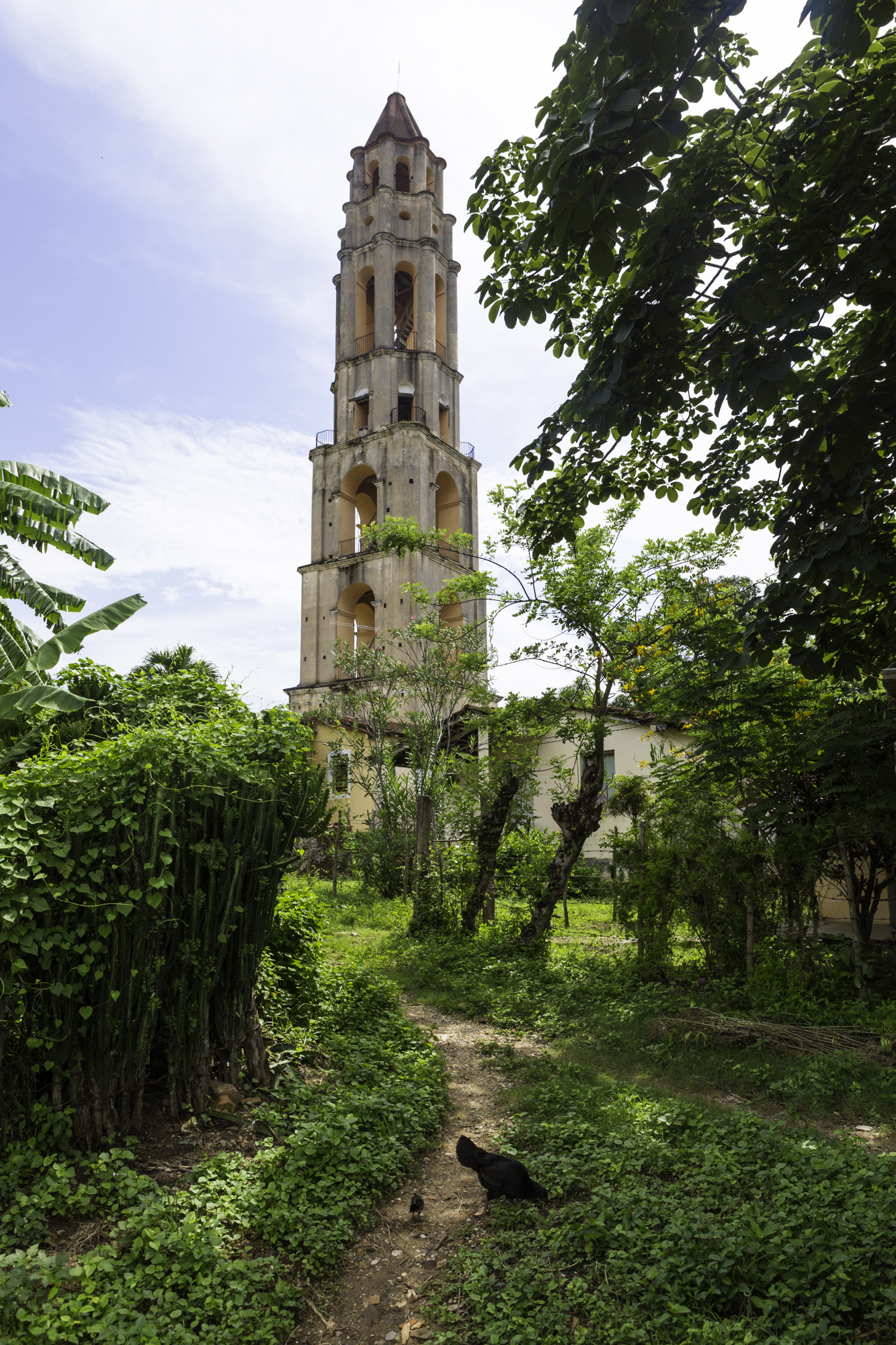
Manaca Iznaga Tower

Sugar production was an important industry for Cuba from the earliest settlement by the Spanish, who introduced sugar cane to the island in 1512, and trade in the commodity enriched Trinidad and the surrounding areas. The island became the world's foremost producer of sugar during the late 18th and 19th centuries, when sugar production was the main industry. The climate and soil were perfect for the cultivation of sugar cane, and good ports and interior connections facilitated transport and exportation of the refined sugar. To prevent the sugar from spoiling, rapid transport was necessary, and to this end a special railway line was laid down through the valley in the late 1880s, connecting the Valle de los Ingenios with Trinidad and the port at Casilda, 6 km (4 mi) from Trinidad, on the coast. The valleys are provided with water by several rivers, among them the Agabama River, Rio Caracusey, Rio de Ay, and Rio Tayaba.

Due to the virtual extinction of the native Cubans through contact with diseases brought by the European settlers and attrition though their poor treatment as slaves, the Spanish plantation owners decided to import Africans to work as slaves in the sugar cane fields and in the mills. The abolition of slavery by the Spanish in 1820 made the practice of importing slaves more difficult; but it was not until the Wars of Independence in the 19th century that the economic dominance of the area came to an end, as many of the sugar mills were abandoned or became run down.

Although most of the sugar mills are in ruins, intact structures endure at some sites, including Guachinango, where the plantation house remains, and the plantation of Manaca Iznaga, where the owner's house, a tower and some barracones, the original slave quarters, still stand. Although the barracones are now used as housing and are in poor repair, the house (which has been converted into a restaurant) and the "Iznaga Tower" are well maintained.

The 45 metre (147 ft) tower was constructed sometime in 1816 by the owner, Alejo Maria Iznaga y Borrell. According to experts, the bell that formerly hung on top of the tower announced the beginning and the end of the work day for the slaves, as well as the times for prayers to the Holy Virgin in the morning, midday, and afternoon. It was also used to sound an alarm in case of fire or slave escape. The height and magnificence of the tower served to display Iznaga's power over his slaves and his stature in the sugar industry and local society; at one time it was the tallest structure in Cuba. A recognised landmark of the region, the Iznaga Tower testifies to the area's flourishing material culture in the Spanish colonial period. The large bell now rests at the foot of the tower.

== Gallery ==
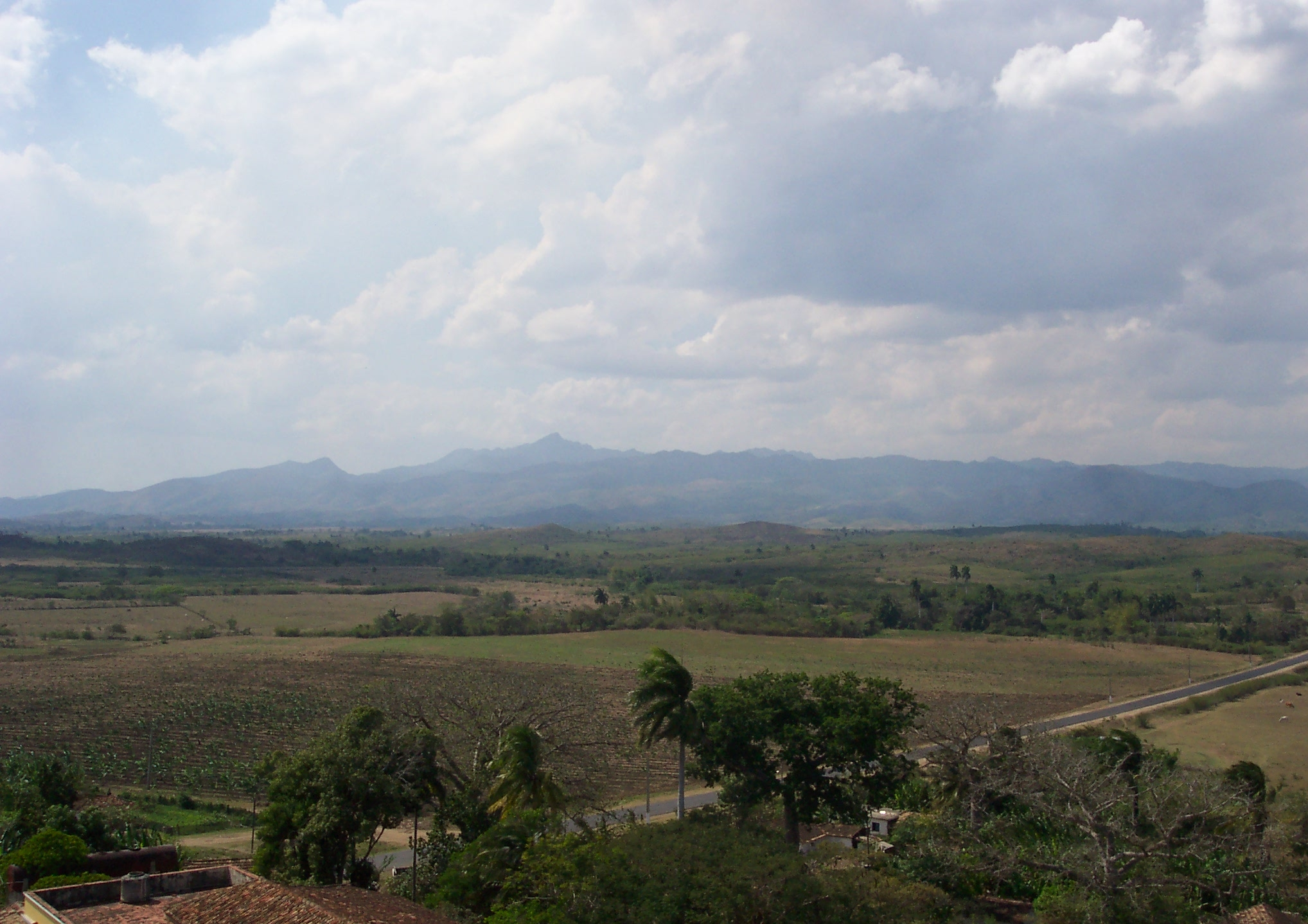
The valley

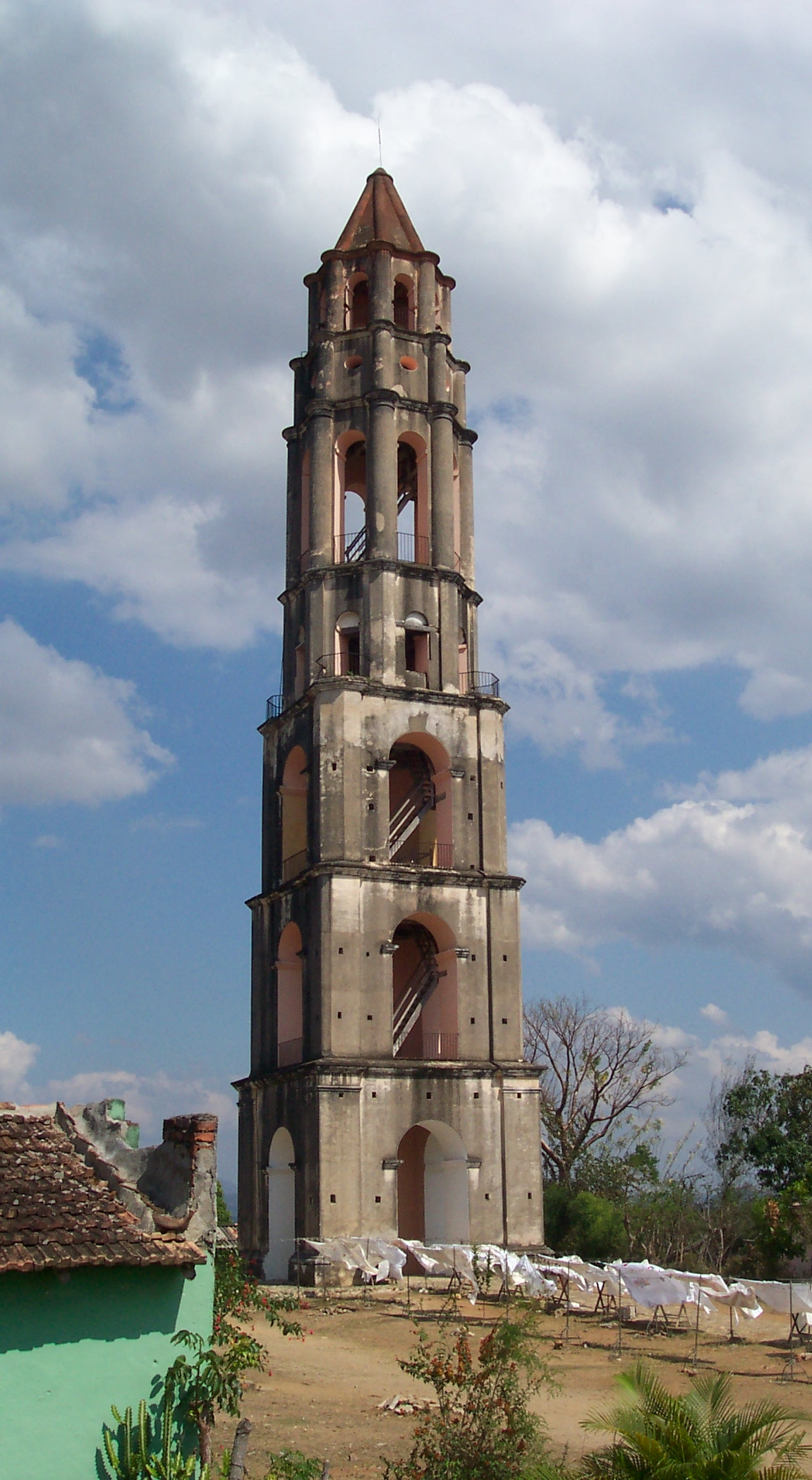
The tower at Manaca Iznaga estate

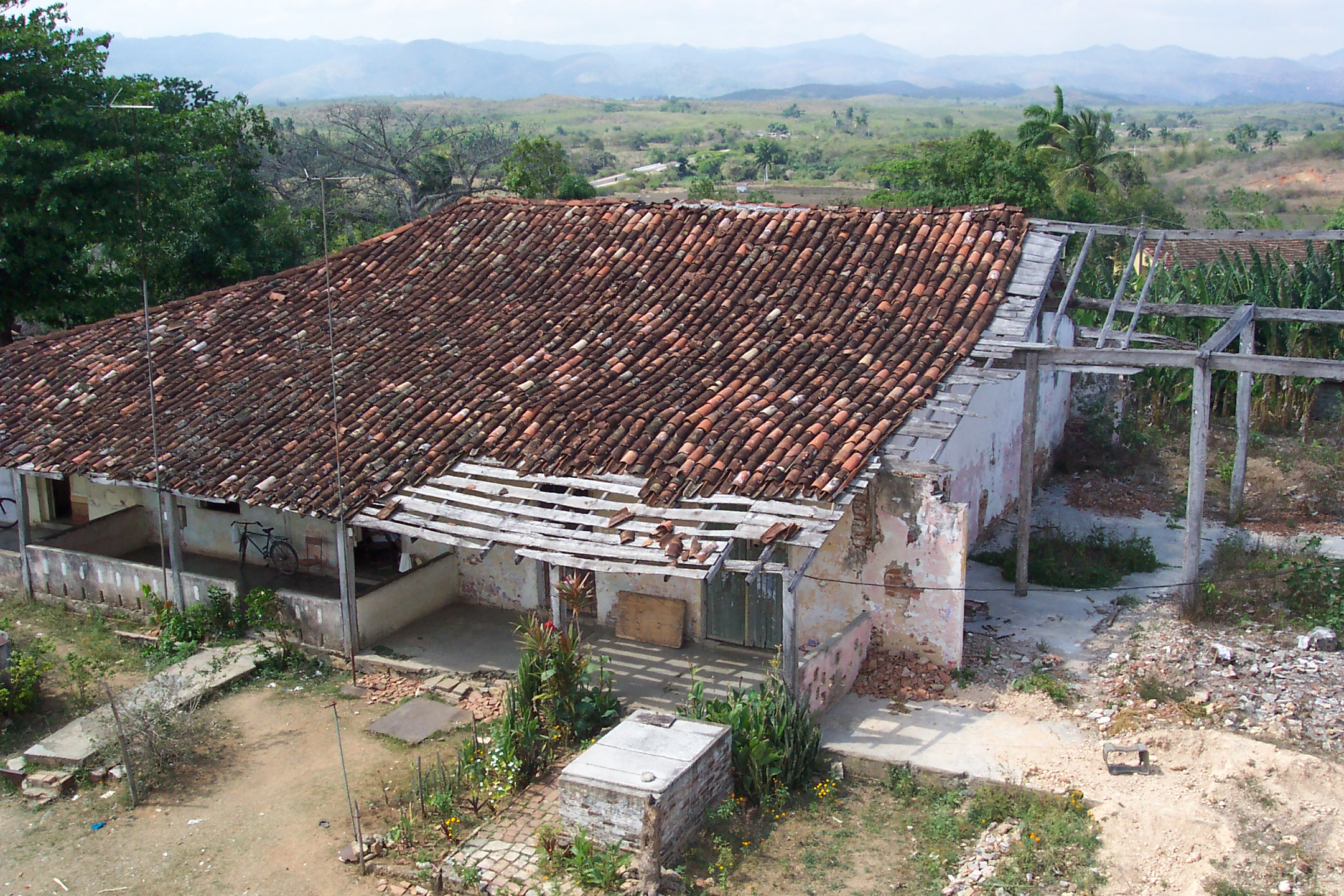
Slave dwellings at Manaca Iznaga estate

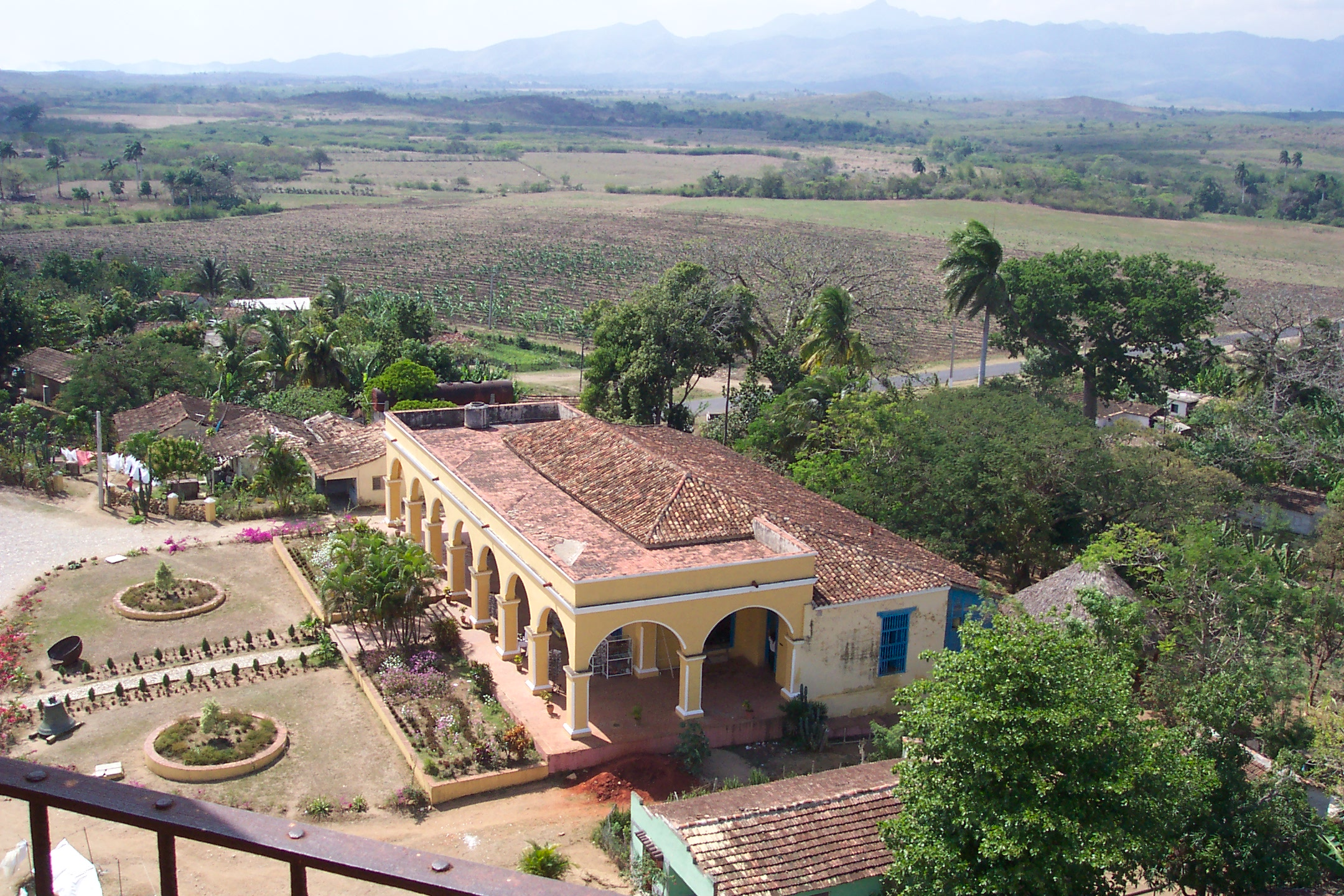
House at Manaca Iznaga estate

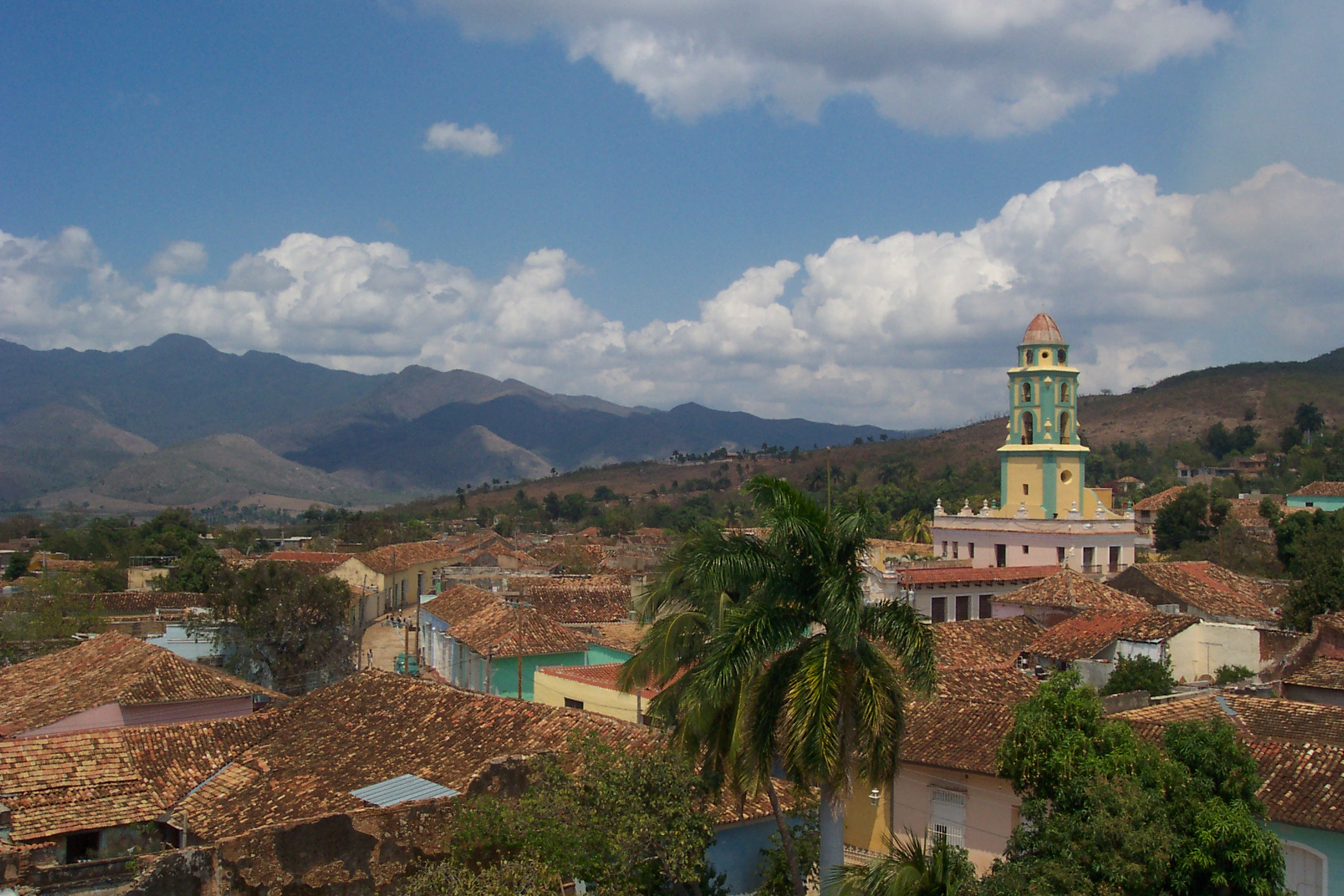
View towards Valle de los Ingenios from Trinidad

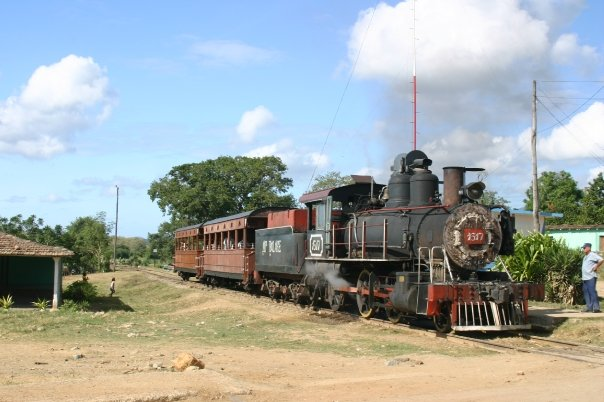
Baldwin Locomotive tourist ride from Trinidad to Manaca Iznaga estate.

== See also ==
- Casilda
- Plaza Mayor de Trinidad
