= Güinía de Miranda =

- Village
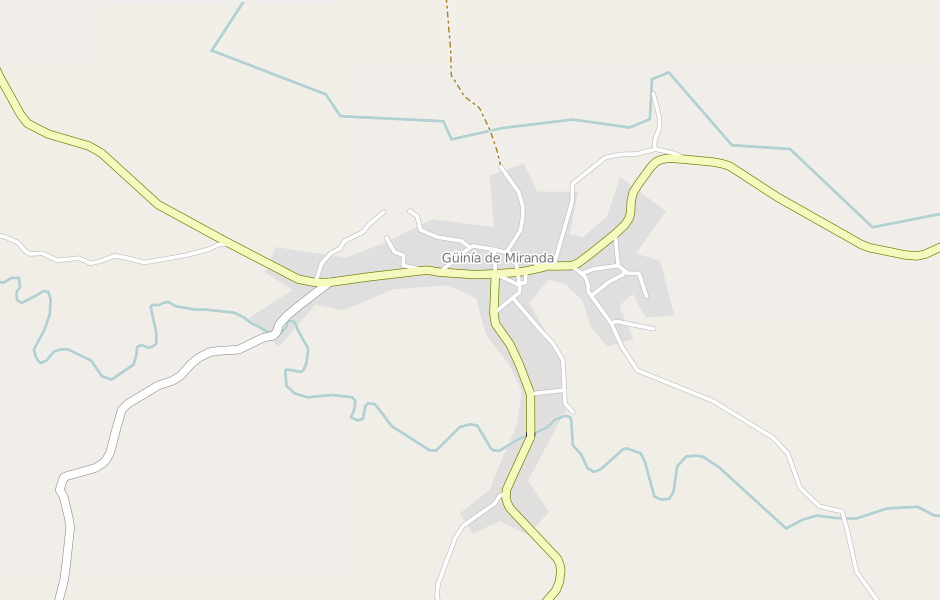
- OSM map showing Güinía de Miranda

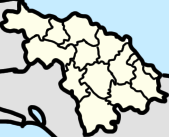
- Location of Güinía de Miranda in Cuba Güinía de Miranda (Villa Clara Province)
- Coordinates: 22°02′48.5″N 79°51′53.0″W
- Country: Cuba
- Province: Villa Clara
- Municipality: Manicaragua
- Founded: 1536

Area
  - Total: 114.2 km^{2} (44.1 sq mi)
- Elevation: 250 m (820 ft)

Population (2011)
  - Total: 3,000
- Time zone: UTC-5 (EST)
- Area code: +53-422

Güinía de Miranda, sometimes shortened as Güinía, is a Cuban village and consejo popular ("people's council", i.e. hamlet) of the municipality of Manicaragua, in Villa Clara Province. It has a population of circa 3,000 and the council's administrative territory covers an area of 114.2 km².

== History ==
Founded in 1536, at the end of the 16th century it was an estate depending from Sancti Spíritus. In 1862 Güinía was made up of 50 buildings and had a population of 300. Until 1976, it was part of the municipality of Fomento.

== Geography ==
Güinía de Miranda is a hilltown surrounded by the Escambray Mountains, crossed by the provincial highway linking Manicaragua (18 km west) to Fomento (17 km east) and Cabaiguán (46 km east), both in the bordering Sancti Spíritus Province. It is the northern end of a road to Valle de los Ingenios (41 km south), a tourist site near the city of Trinidad (43 km). A secondary mountain road, 10 km long, links it to Jibacoa, a village close to the Hanabanilla Lake.

The village is 28 km far from Mataguá, 39 from the tourist resort of El Salto del Hanabanilla, 52 from Santa Clara, 65 from Sancti Spíritus, and 74 from Cienfuegos.

== See also ==
- Topes de Collantes
- Municipalities of Cuba
- List of cities in Cuba
