= Mataguá =

- Village
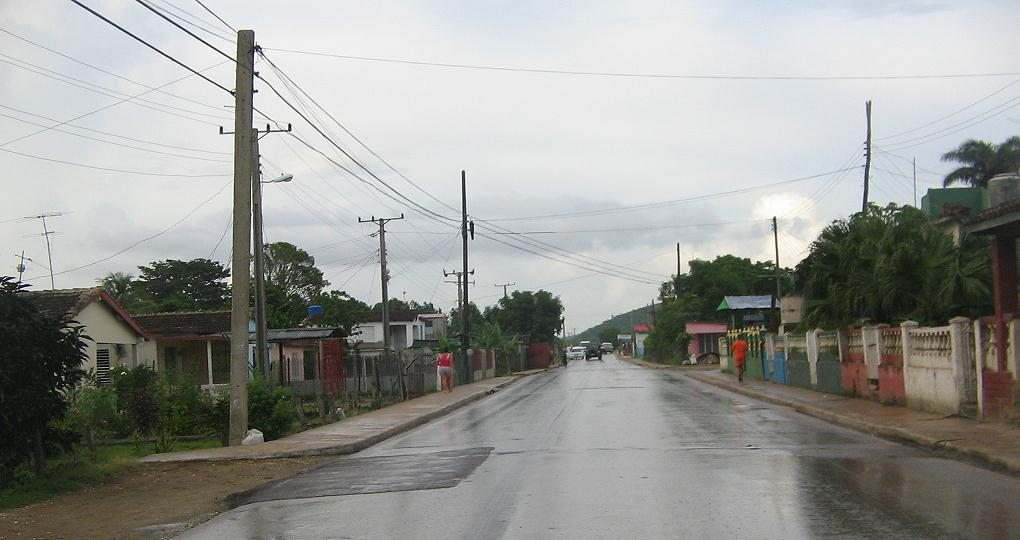
- View of the main road (Carretera de Manicaragua)

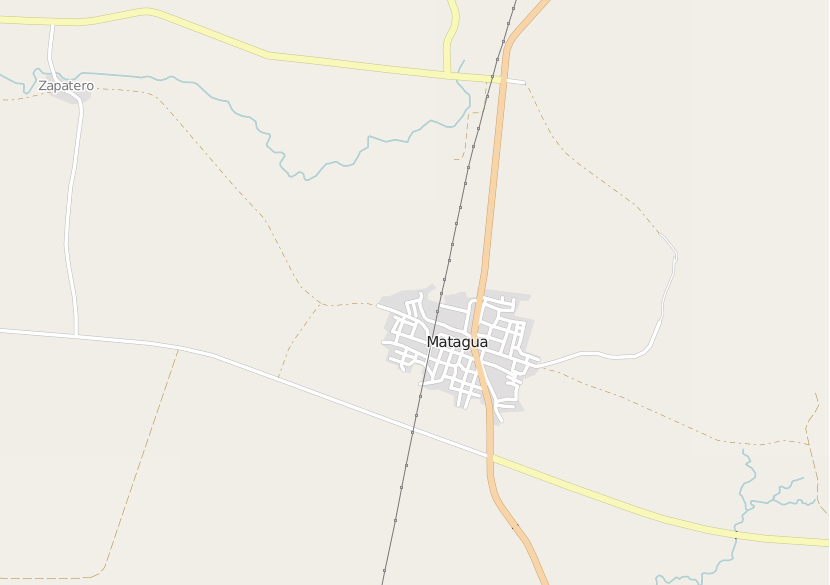
- OSM map showing Mataguá and its surrounding area

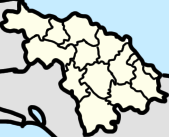
- Location of Mataguá in Cuba Mataguá (Villa Clara Province)
- Coordinates: 22°14′13.31″N 79°59′57.26″W
- Country: Cuba
- Province: Villa Clara
- Municipality: Manicaragua
- Founded: 1868
- Elevation: 150 m (490 ft)

Population
  - Total: ca. 10,000
- Time zone: UTC-5 (EST)
- Area code: +53-422

Mataguá is a Cuban village and consejo popular ("people's council", i.e. hamlet) of the municipality of Manicaragua, in Villa Clara Province. With a population of ca. 10,000, it is the most populated village in the municipality after Manicaragua.

== History ==
Founded in 1868 as a farm estate owned by a Spanish man named Jacinto Rivero, it was sold some years later to Susano Rodríguez, who changed its aboriginal name, Mataguá, to Palma Sola. In 1904, the property was transferred to the brothers Pablo and Belisario Millar Vila. The new owners restored the estate's original name, Mataguá.

The village was connected to the mains in 1927, and had a train station on a no longer active line. During the Cuban Revolution, Mataguá was taken by the revolutionaries on 22 December 1958, one week before the Battle of Santa Clara, by a group led by the commander Raúl Nieves.

== Geography ==
Located 11 km in north of Manicaragua and 27 in south of the city of Santa Clara, Mataguá spans on a valley near the Escambray Mountains, next to the village of Jorobada (8 km far). It is crossed in the middle by the state highway "474" (Carretera de Manicaragua), linking Santa Clara to Manicaragua and to the A1 motorway exit "Santa Clara South", 10 km in north of Mataguá. The highway, which continues as "152" and crosses the Topes de Collantes nature reserve, ends in the town of Trinidad, 71 km in south. The village is also 31 km far from the resort of Hanabanilla, 26 from Báez, 53 from Placetas, and 66 from Cienfuegos.

== Personalities ==
- Ofelia Domínguez Navarro (1894-1976), writer, teacher, lawyer, feminist, and activist.

== See also ==
- Jibacoa
- Güinía de Miranda
- Municipalities of Cuba
- List of cities in Cuba
