= Jibacoa (Manicaragua) =

- Village
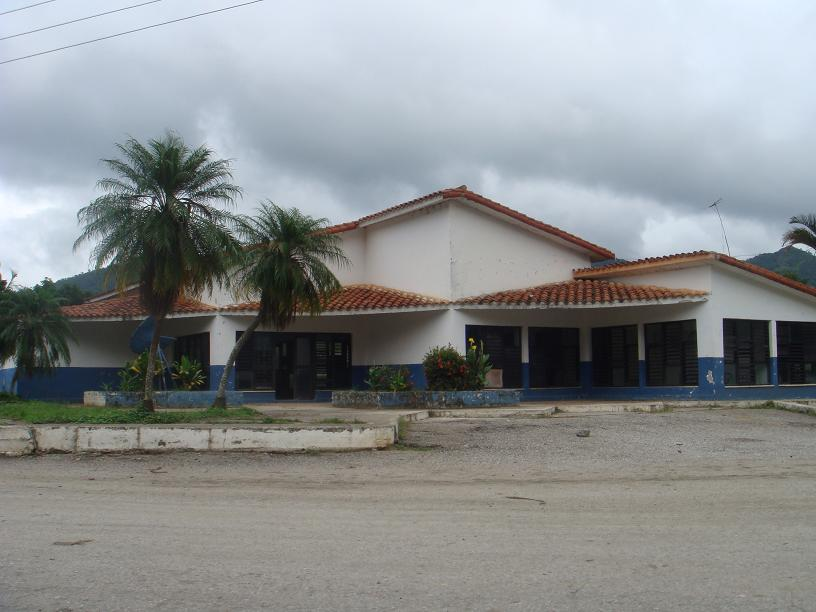
- Jibacoa omnibus station

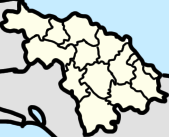
- Location of Jibacoa in Cuba Jibacoa (Villa Clara Province)
- Coordinates: 22°01′02.1″N 79°59′21.7″W
- Country: Cuba
- Province: Villa Clara
- Municipality: Manicaragua
- Founded: 1961

Area
  - Total: 78.5 km^{2} (30.3 sq mi)
- Elevation: 300 m (980 ft)

Population (2004)
  - Total: 3,101
  - Density: 39.75/km^{2} (103.0/sq mi)
- Time zone: UTC-5 (EST)
- Area code: +53-422

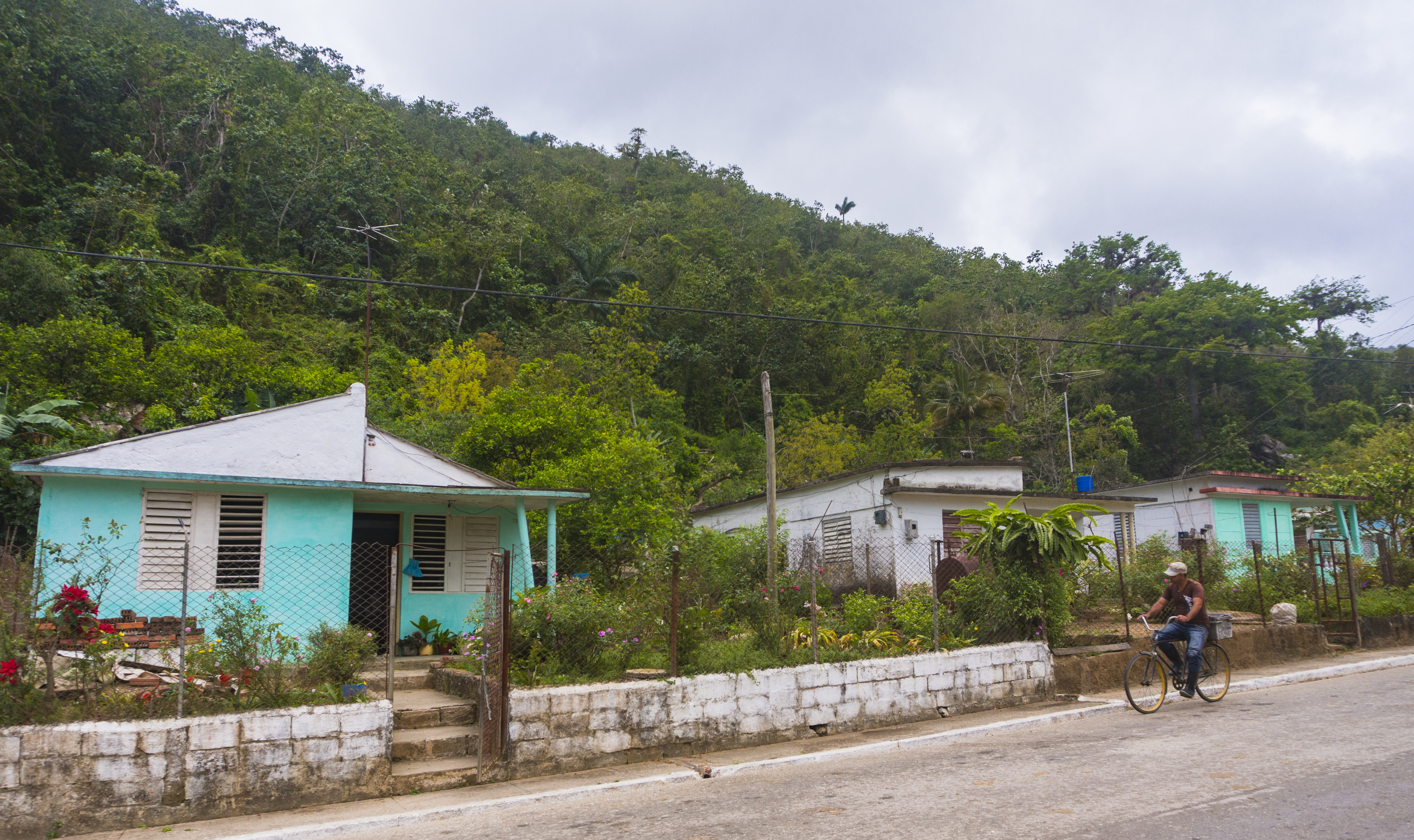
Houses in "Mountain Architecture" style (1960s onward) in Jibacoa's main road.

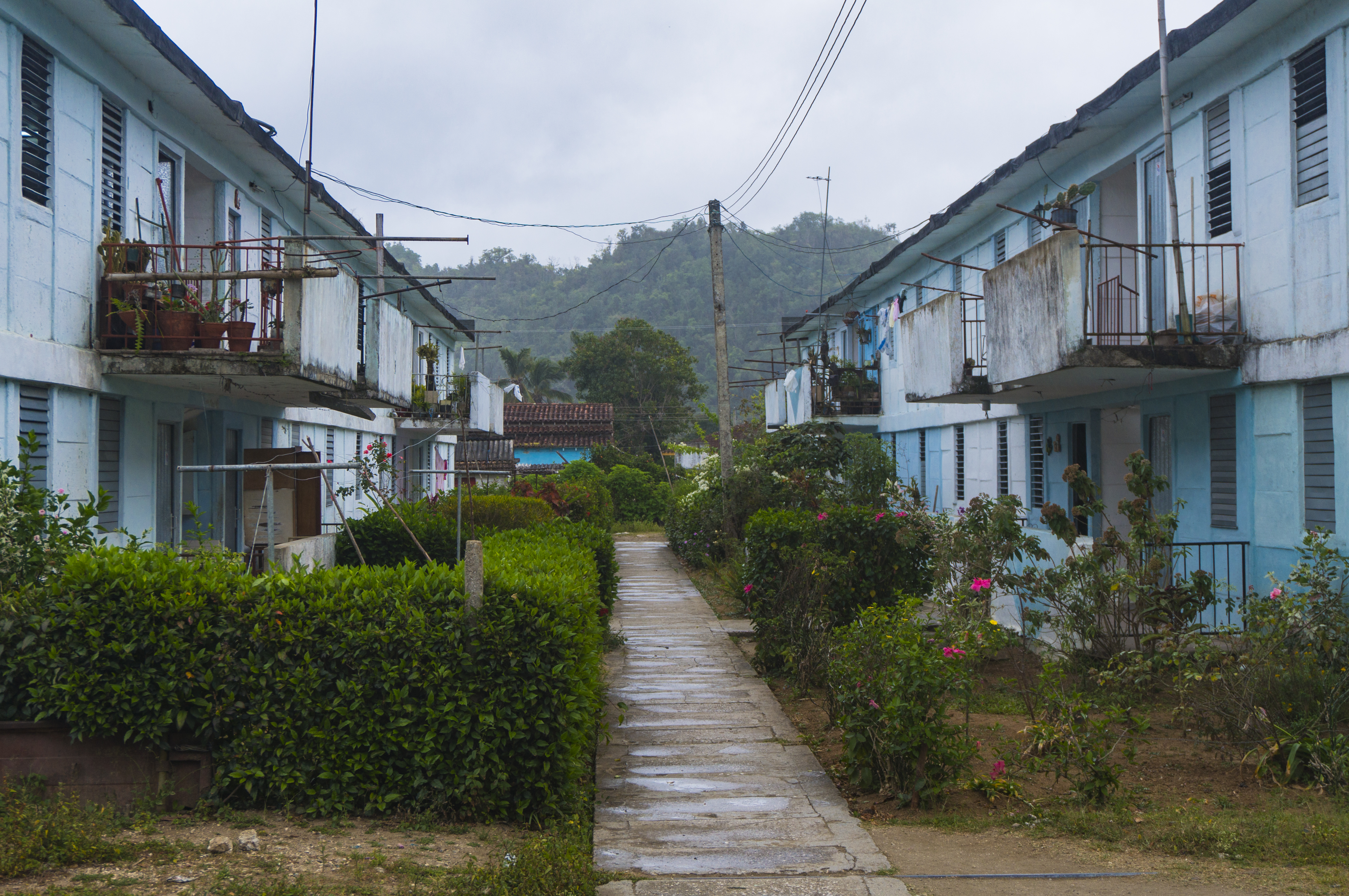
Bi-plantas (two story buildings) in Jibacoa, Manicaragua, Cuba.

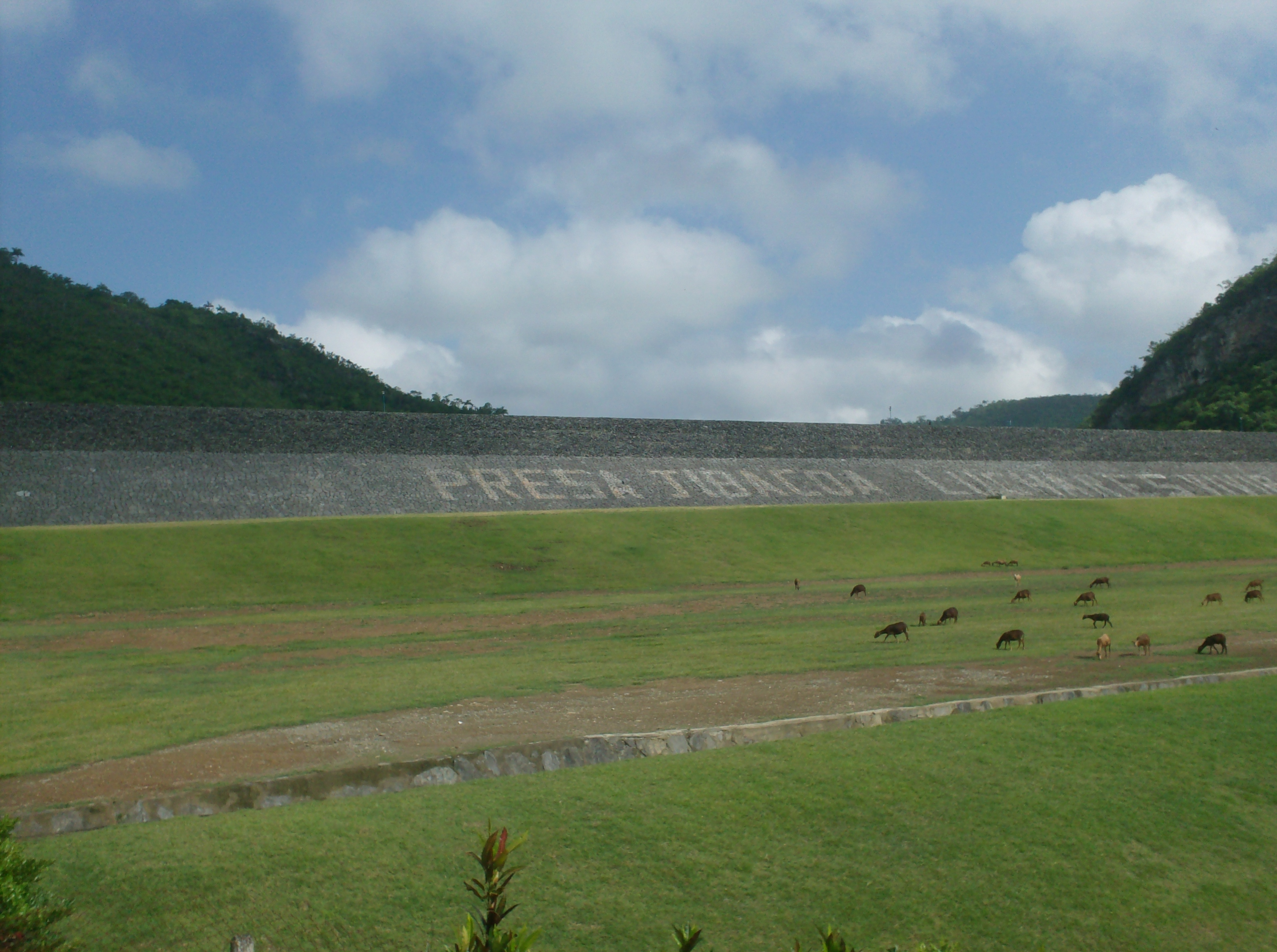
The Jibacoa Dam by the Hanabanilla Lake

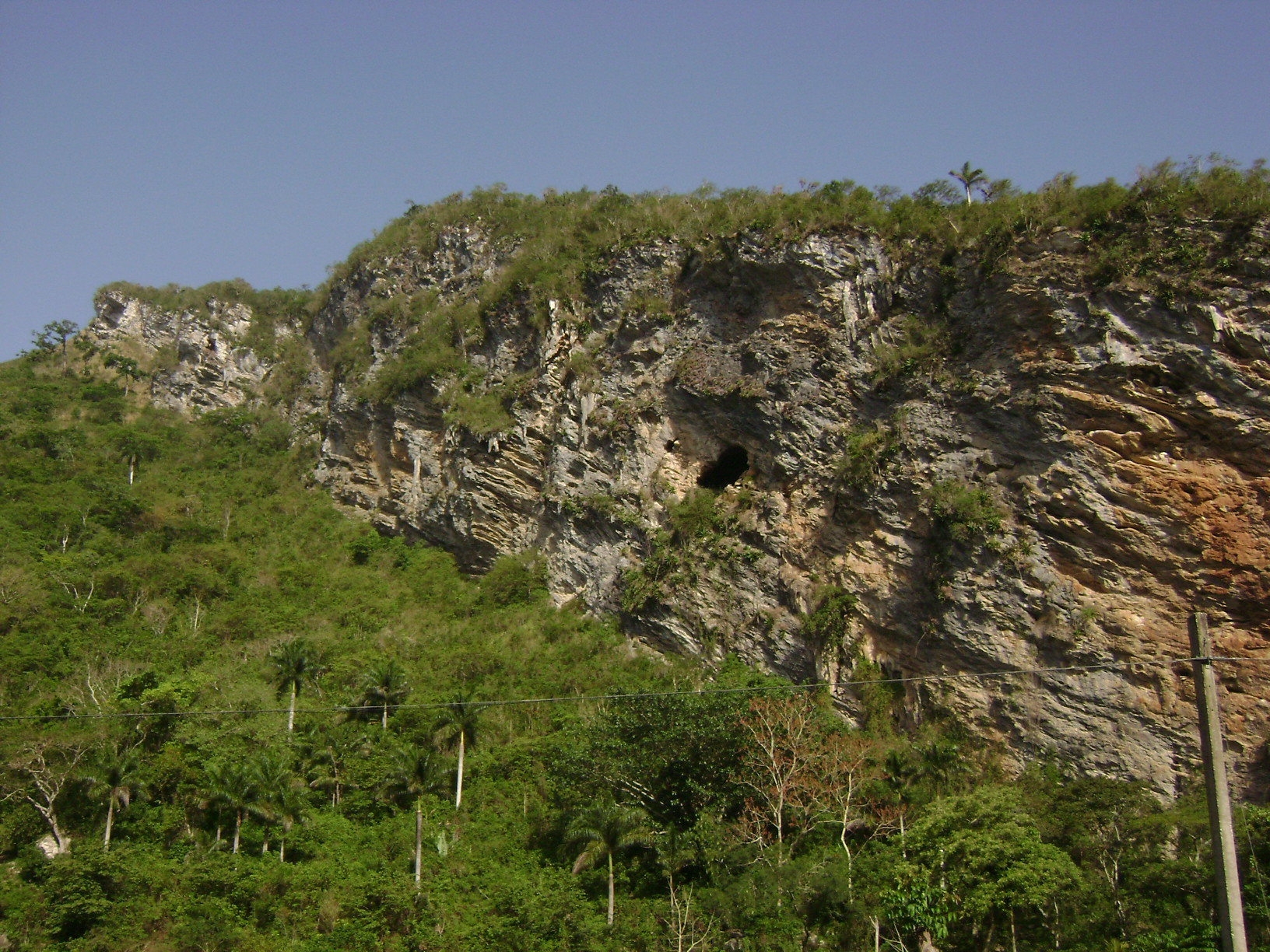
Cueva del Guanajo

Jibacoa is a Cuban village and consejo popular ("people's council", i.e. hamlet) of the municipality of Manicaragua, in Villa Clara Province. As of 2004, it had a population of 3,101; and the council's administrative territory covers an area of 78.5 km^{2}.

== History ==
The village was founded in 1961, soon after the Cuban Revolution. Its toponyms, as well as other included in the municipality (as Manicaragua, Mataguá, etc.) have an Arawak origin.

== Geography ==
=== Overview ===
Jibacoa is a hilltown surrounded by the Escambray Mountains, located near the southeastern shore of the Hanabanilla Lake and the Jibacoa Dam (Presa Jibacoa), and 39 km from the resort village of El Salto del Hanabanilla. The Jibacoa River flows to the east of the settlement and, next to it, is located a karst cave named Cueva del Guanajo.

It lies near the border point of Villa Clara Province with the ones of Cienfuegos and Sancti Spíritus, and is crossed by the provincial highway 152, linking Manicaragua (17 km north) to Trinidad (44 km south), through the nature reserve of Topes de Collantes. A secondary mountain road, 10 km long, links it to the village of Güinía de Miranda.

The village is 46 km far from Cumanayagua, 74 from Cienfuegos and 76 from Santa Clara.

=== Subdivision ===
The consejo popular of Jibacoa is divided in 11 areas: Jibacoa plus 10 minor villages and localities.

Village	Population
Jibacoa	1,483
Aguas Claras	62
Can Can	83
El Caney	34
El Guayabal	311
Guanayara	21
Manantiales	141
Picos Blancos	428
Punto Guanayara	65
Rincón Naranjo	225
Veguitas	248

== Culture ==
In the village are held different events throughout the year: the Festival del Cine de la Montaña ("Mountain's Film Festival") from 1995, the Festival del Libro de la Montaña ("Mountain's Book Festival"), and the Carnavales de Junio ("June Carnivals").

== See also ==
- Hanabanilla Dam
- Municipalities of Cuba
- List of cities in Cuba
