= Agabama River =

River in Cuba

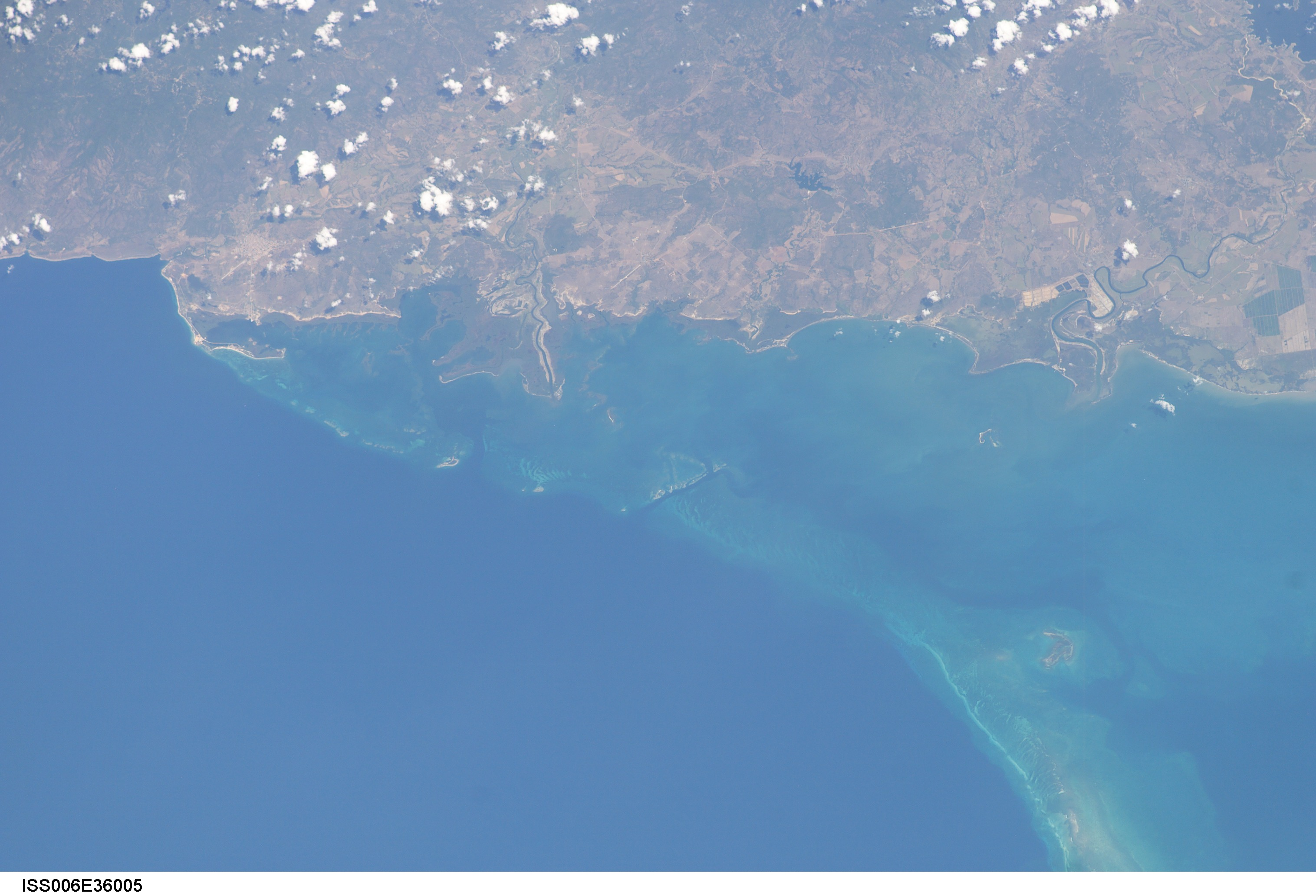
- Native name: Río Agabama (Spanish)

Location
- Country: Cuba
- Province: Sancti Spíritus, Villa Clara

Physical characteristics
- Source: Sierra de Agabama
- Mouth: Caribbean Sea
  - coordinates: 21°40′05″N 79°49′37″W
  - elevation: 0 metres (0 ft)
- Length: 118 km (73 mi)
- Basin size: 1,713 km^{2} (661 sq mi)

The Agabama River (Spanish: Río Agabama) is a river on the southern slope of the island of Cuba. The river begins in the Santa Clara Mountains and runs 118 km (73 mi) between the Escambray Mountains to the west and Sierra de Sancti Spíritus to the east. It passes through multiple municipalities, one of which being Fomento, before flowing out into the Caribbean Sea and forming a delta. After the river crosses the road between Trinidad and Sancti Spíritus, it gains the name "Manatí". Overall, the total basin area of the river is 1,713 km^{2} (661 sq mi). The river has multiple tributaries, some being the Ay, Tabla, Juaya, Mabujina, Guaracabulla, Caracusey, Seibabo, and Sipiapo rivers.

The river is one of the largest rivers in Sancti Spíritus Province. For much of its course, it cuts deep through sandstone and forms the Agabama valley, one of the valleys of the Valle de los Ingenios, a UNESCO World Heritage Site. Throughout the 1980s, many highly polluting waste products and contaminants were dumped into the river by the Ramón Ponciano, F.N.T.A. plants and the Papelera Pulpa Cuba (Pulpa Cuba Paper Mill).

The river has also overflowed its banks and flooded the village of Agabama multiple times.

== See also ==
- List of rivers of Cuba
