= El Salto del Hanabanilla =

El Salto del Hanabanilla Hanabanilla
- Village
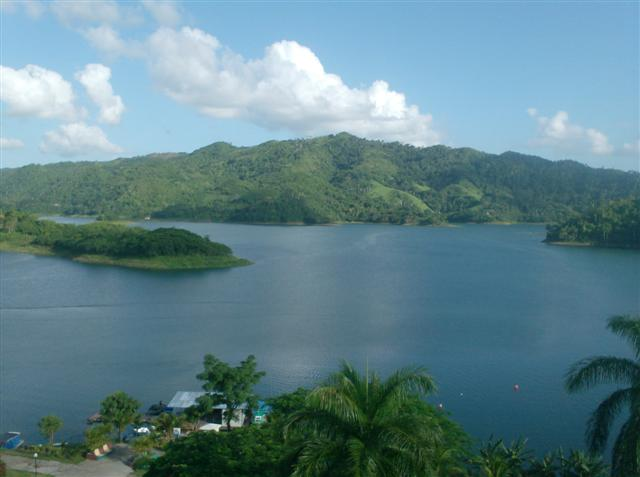
- Hanabanilla Lake

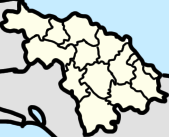
- Location of El Salto del Hanabanilla in Cuba El Salto del Hanabanilla (Villa Clara Province)
- Coordinates: 22°5′46.25″N 80°3′59.15″W
- Country: Cuba
- Province: Villa Clara
- Municipality: Manicaragua
- Founded: 1802
- Elevation: 350 m (1,150 ft)

Population (2011)
  - Total: 436
- Time zone: UTC-5 (EST)
- Area code: +35 422

El Salto del Hanabanilla, also known as Hanabanilla, is a Cuban village and consejo popular ("people's council", i.e. hamlet) of the municipality of Manicaragua, Villa Clara Province. As of 2014 the town has 137 homes making up a total of 436 inhabitants. Is a mountain resort famous for the homonym lake.

== History ==
El Salto del Hanabanilla was originally settled by Taino people; so far 35 aboriginal villages have been discovered around this area. After the Spanish colonization it remained virtually untouched until the early 19th century, when it was finally settled in 1802 by Galician families trying to foment the production of tobacco and coffee and create cattle farms.

The idea to create a man-made reservoir is also quite old; it was first proposed in 1868, in order to efficiently supply the port city Cienfuegos with fresh water and electricity for its electrical tramway system. But it wasn't until 1908 when it finally was approved. Construction of the dam itself started in 1959 and finished in 1963, along with the construction of a clinic and a school in the centre of the village, nearby the dam.

A 126-room hotel of the same name was built in July 1975 using a Cuban adaptation of the Russian construction system popular in the 1970s to create schools and hotels through the island. This precast technology is named Girón, after the same location where the Bay of Pigs Invasion took place in 1961. It has been recently restored and it is the deployment point for nature tourism and fresh water bass fishing activities around the surrounding mountains.

== Geography ==
Located in the northern area of the Escambray Mountains, by the Hanabanilla Lake, created by the Hanabanilla Dam, the village is surrounded by mountain tropical rain forest receiving a mean of 1,346.3 millimeters of rain water during rainy season (approximately 130 days of rain). Many rivers and brooks deposit fresh water into the lake being the largest ones Negro (Literally Black), Arimao, Caonao, Mabujina, Hanabanilla, Jibacoa and Guanayara, except for the first one -Black River- the rest of the streams and most of the geography around the area retain the original Taino Arawak names. Hanabanilla means "A basket full of Gold" in Taino language. The humidity around the lake forest has a mean of 82,73% water vapor which aids the evergreen look of the area year round.

Linked to the Manicaragua-Cumanayagua road (8 km far) by a dead end road to the lake. A street crossing a dam links its populated area to the nearby "Hotel Hanabanilla". In front of the village is located an islet.

El Salto del Hanabanilla is close to the borders of Cienfuegos Province and is 21 km far from Manicaragua, 22 from Cumanayagua, 39 from Jibacoa (in the southeastern shore of the lake), 50 from Cienfuegos, 52 from Santa Clara and 81 from Trinidad.

== Gallery ==
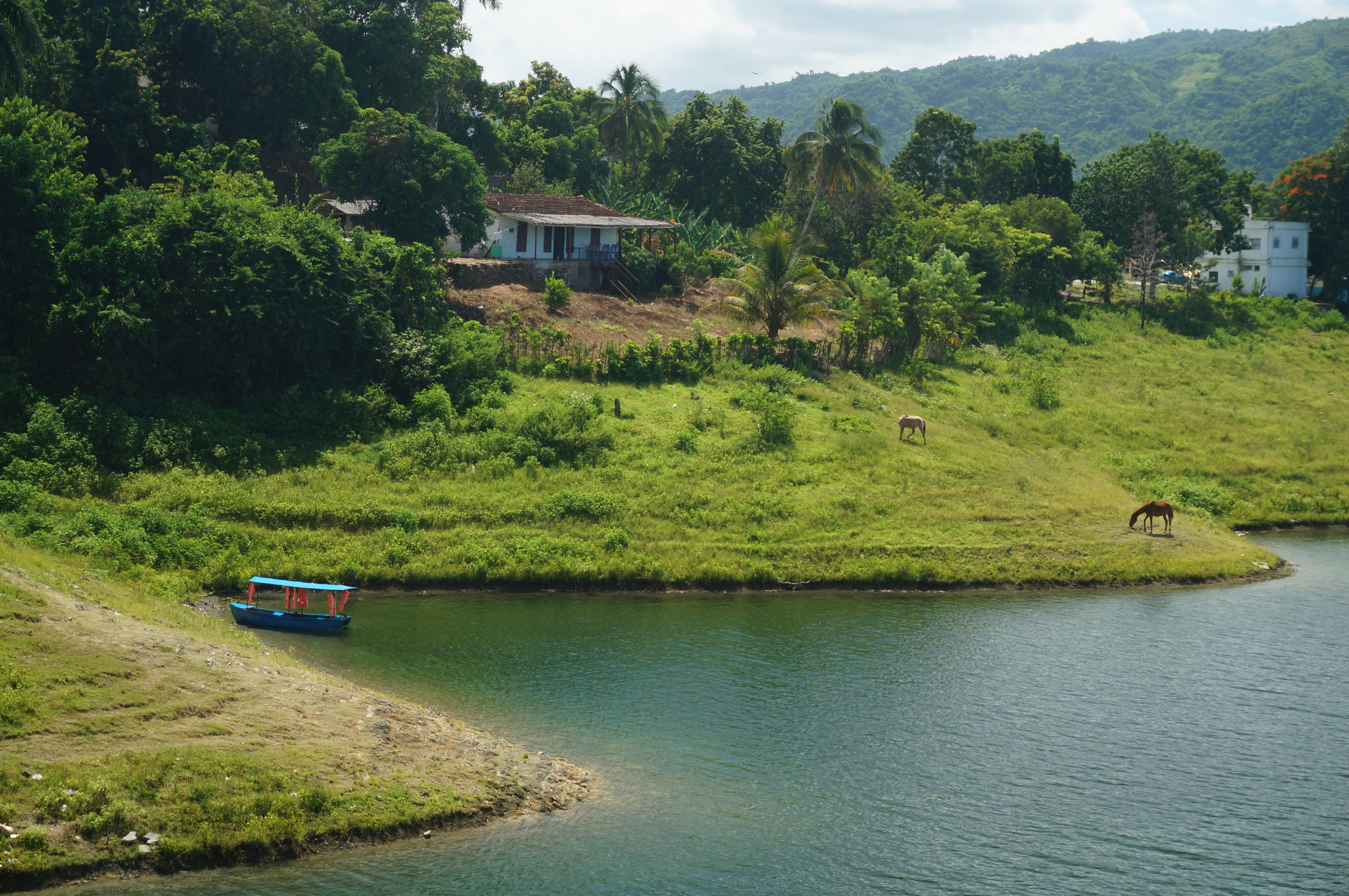
Some houses and medical clinic of Hanabanilla village visible from the lake's courtain.

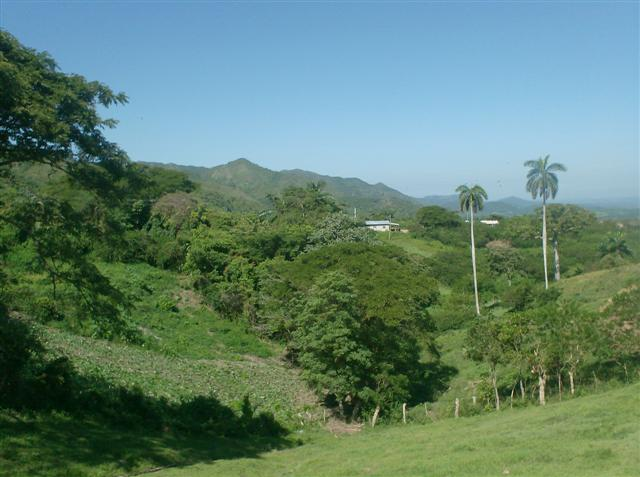
View of the Escambray Mountains north side from the village.

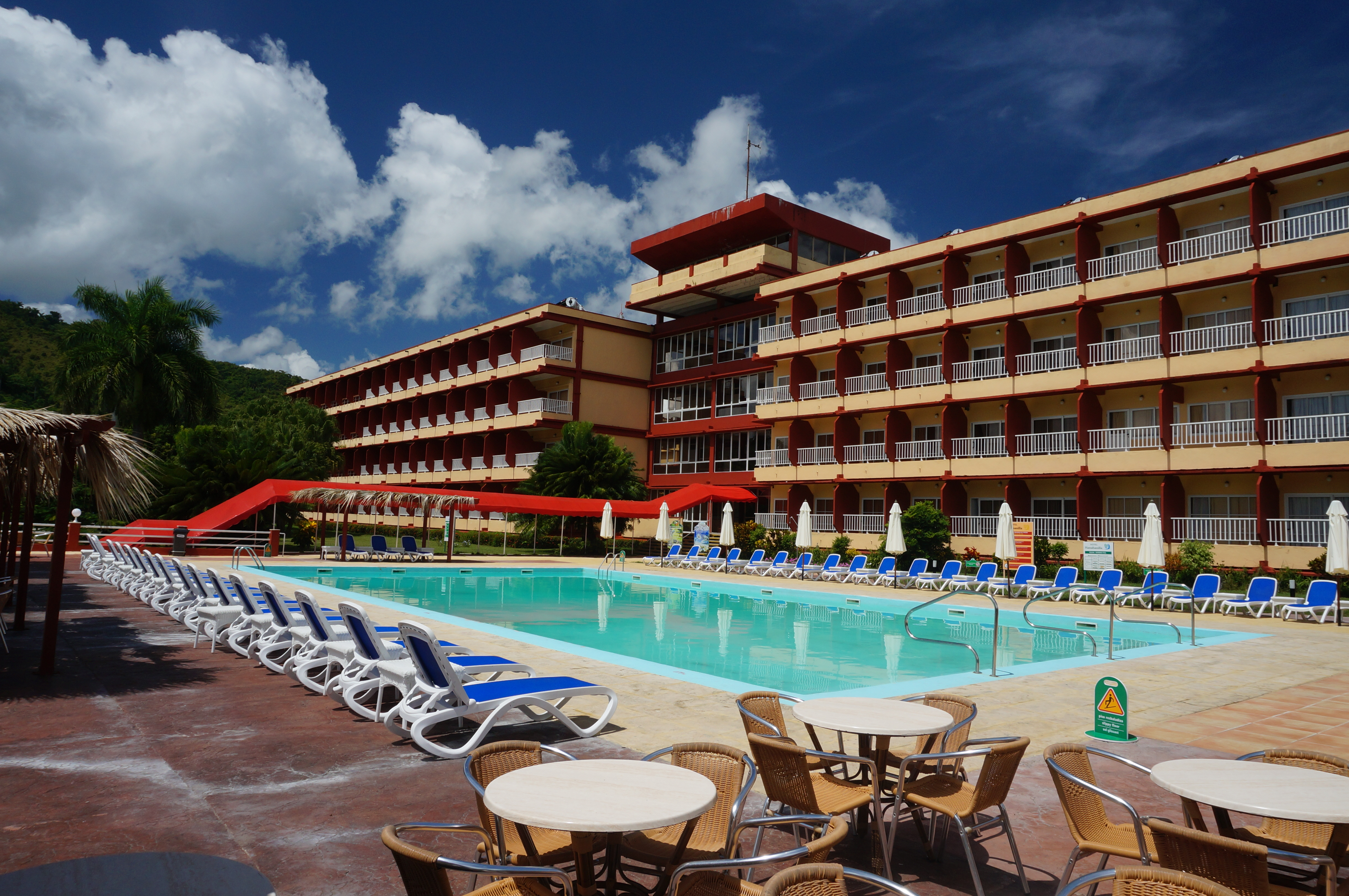
View of a 70's built Hanabanilla Hotel grounds.
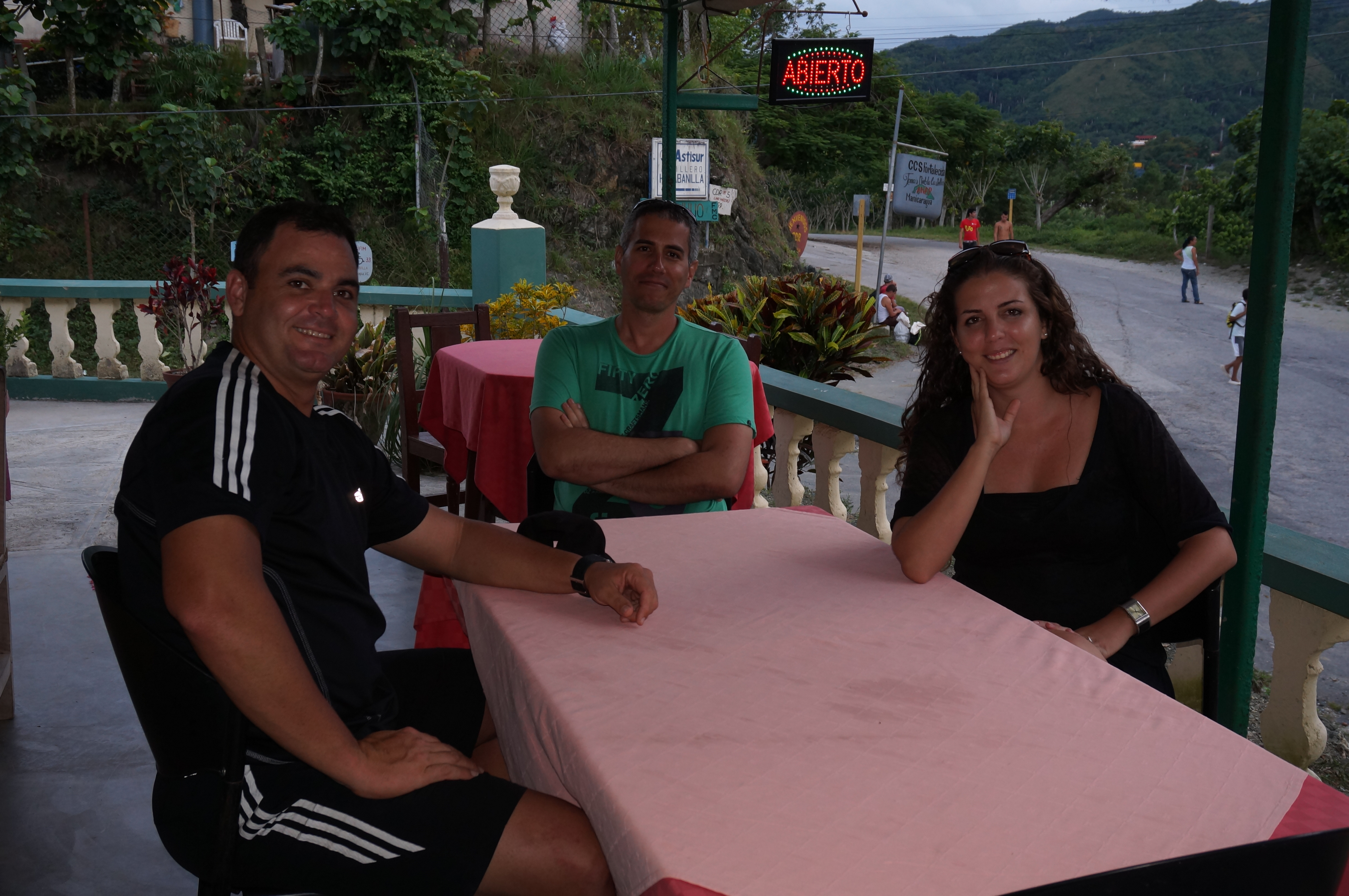
A family restaurant in Hanabanilla village.

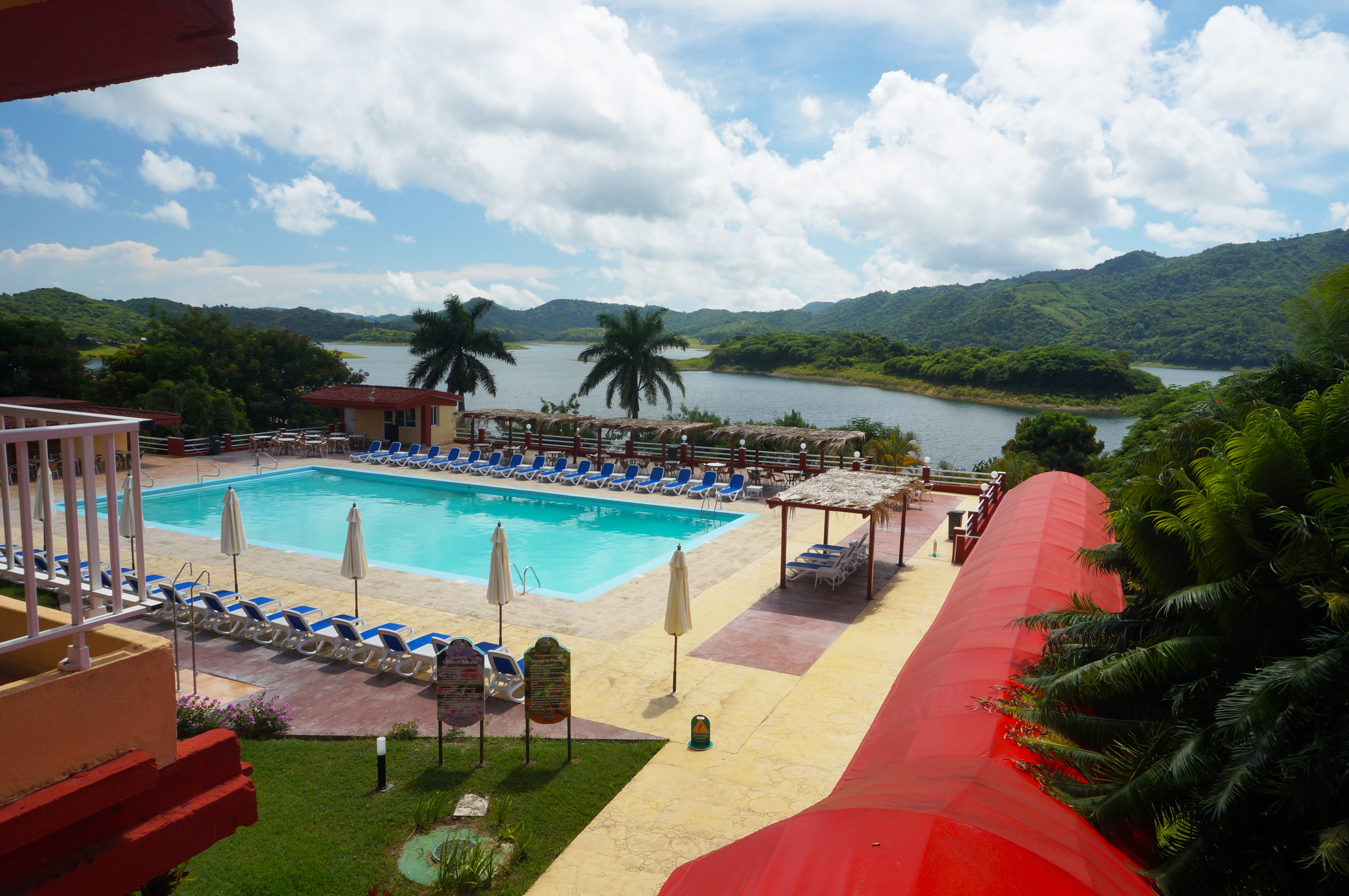
Partial view of Hanabanilla Lake from Hanabanilla hotel.

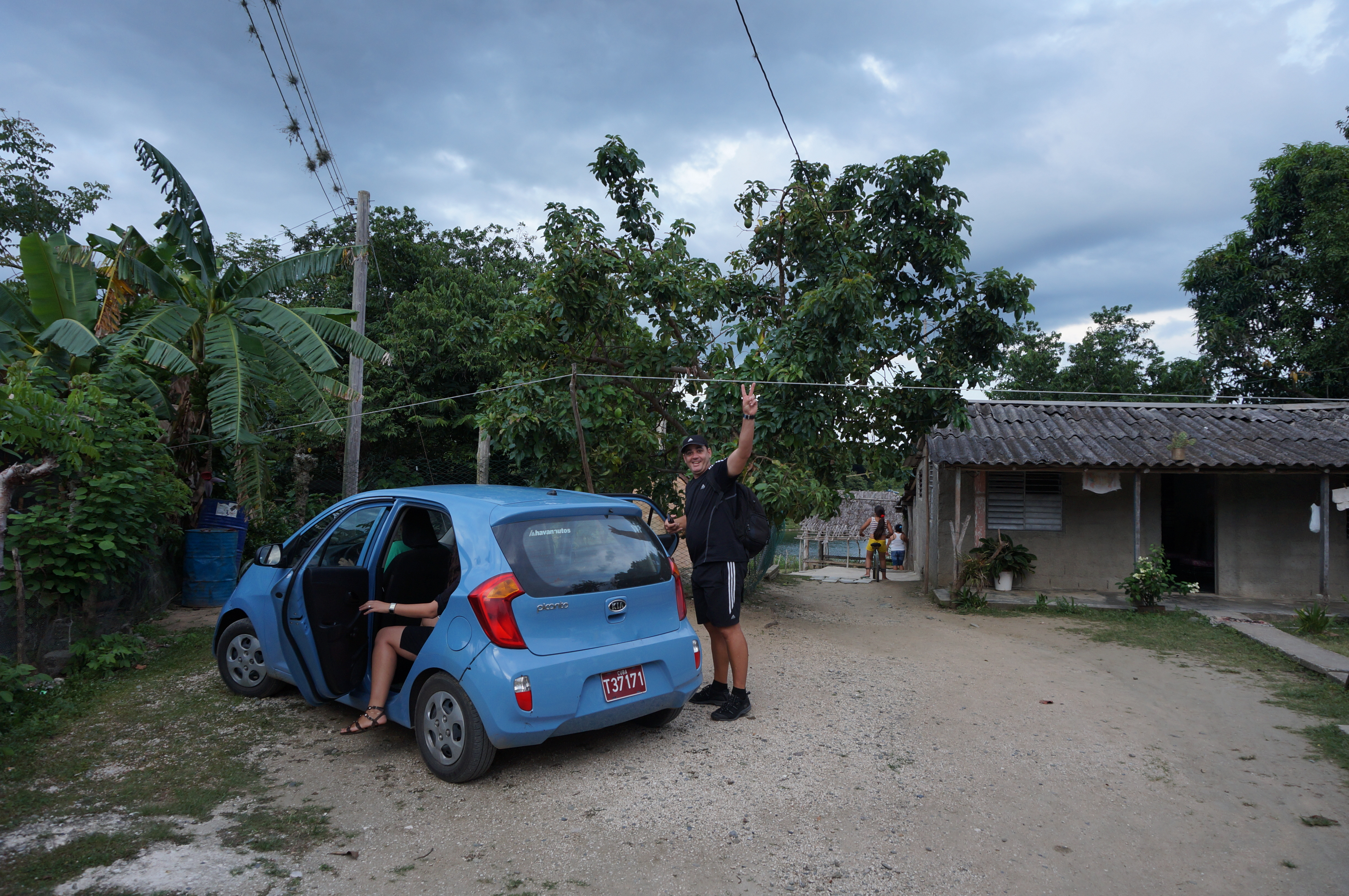
A house at the south end portion of Hanabanilla village.

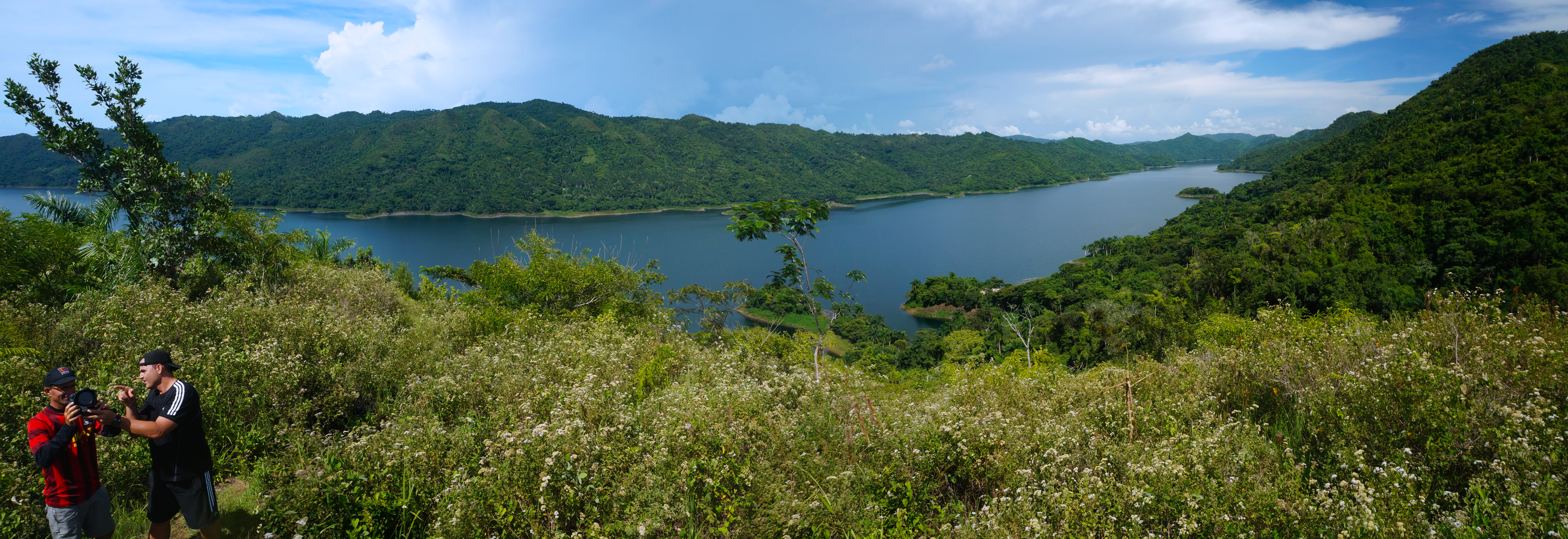
Partial view of Hanabanilla lake from Rio Negro mountain top.

== See also ==
- Mataguá
- Güinía de Miranda
- Topes de Collantes
- Tourism in Cuba
- List of cities in Cuba
- Municipalities of Cuba
