= University "Marta Abreu" of Las Villas =

Cuban public university

- Universidad Central "Marta Abreu" de Las Villas
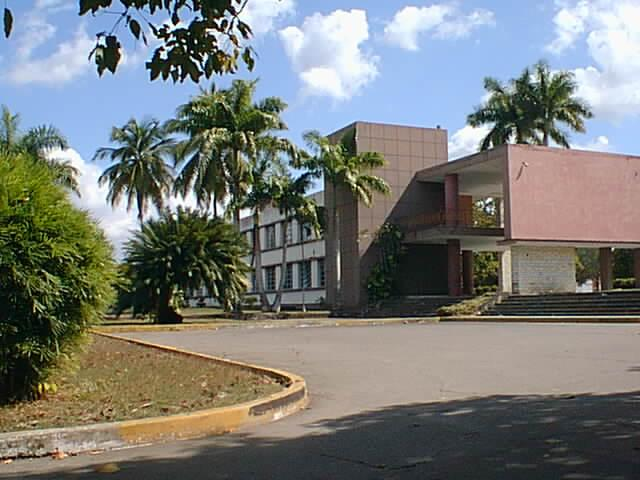
- Motto: Veritate sola nobis imponetur virilis toga
- Motto in English: Only the truth will give us the virile toga
- Type: Public
- Established: 30 November 1952; 73 years ago
- Rector: Dr. Osana Molerio Pérez
- Students: 7,500
- Location: Carretera a Camajuaní, 5 1/2 kilometres (3.4 mi), Santa Clara, Villa Clara, Cuba
- Website: www.uclv.edu.cu

The University "Marta Abreu" of Las Villas (Spanish: Universidad Central "Marta Abreu" de Las Villas, UCLV) is an undergraduate and graduate public university in Santa Clara, Cuba, founded in 1952 and having a remote campus called "Universidad de Montaña" in Topes de Collantes, the heart of the Escambray Mountains.

It is the alma mater of the current President of Cuba and First Secretary of the Communist Party of Cuba, Miguel Díaz-Canel.

== Organization ==
The university academic programs are divided into 13 departments with an added program in the Department of Humanities which offers a bachelor's degree in journalism.

- Faculty of Electrical Engineering
- Faculty of Mechanical Engineering
- Faculty of Mathematics – Physics – Computer Science
- Faculty of Industrial Engineering and Tourism
- Faculty of Chemistry – Pharmacy
- Faculty of Construction Engineering
- Faculty of Agriculture
- Faculty of Economics
- Faculty of Humanities
- Faculty of Social Sciences
- Faculty of Psychology
- Faculty of Law
- Faculty of Information Science and Education

== See also ==
- Education in Cuba
- List of universities in Cuba
