= Armando de Armas =

Armando de Armas may refer to:

- Armando de Armas Meléndez (1920–2000), Venezuelan businessman, founder of the Bloque De Armas media company
- Armando de Armas Romero (1914–1981), Cuban painter
- Armando de Armas (writer) (1958–2024), Cuban writer and journalist
