= Fomento =

- Municipality
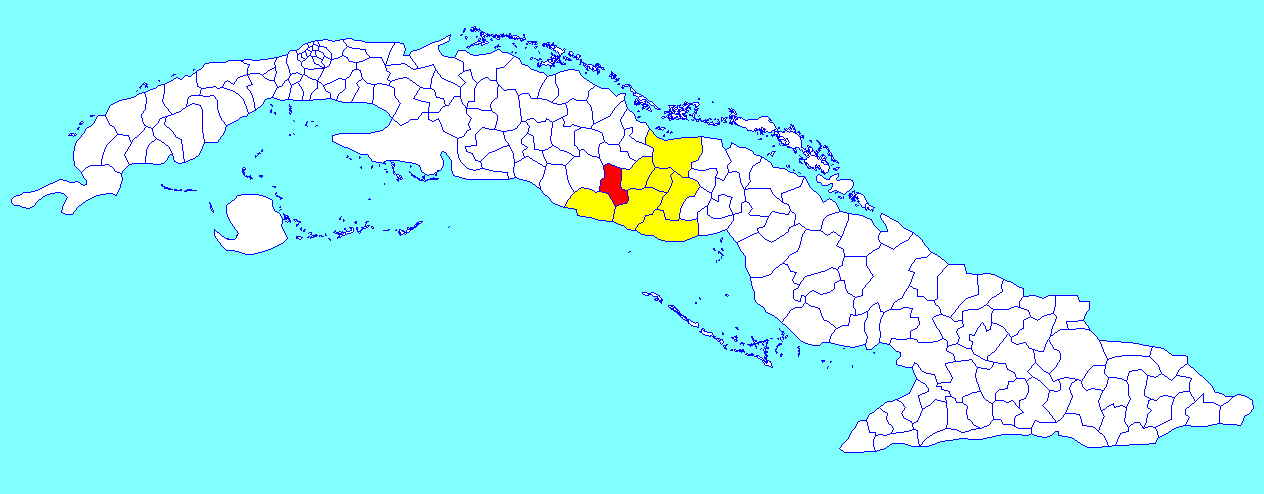
- Fomento municipality (red) within Sancti Spíritus Province (yellow) and Cuba
- Coordinates: 22°06′19″N 79°43′13″W
- Country: Cuba
- Province: Sancti Spíritus
- Founded: 1864
- Established: 1933 (Municipality

Area
  - Total: 471 km^{2} (182 sq mi)
- Elevation: 125 m (410 ft)

Population (2022)
  - Total: 31,131
  - Density: 66.1/km^{2} (171/sq mi)
- Time zone: UTC-5 (EST)
- Area code: +53-41
- Website: https://fomento.gob.cu/

Fomento is a town and municipality in the Sancti Spíritus Province of Cuba. It was founded in 1864.

== Geography ==
The municipality is divided into the barrios of Fomento (municipal seat) and the village of Jíquimas. Until 1976 the villages of Juan Bravo and Güinía de Miranda were part of Fomento, when they passed in the new province of Villa Clara, as part of the municipality of Manicaragua.

== Demographics ==
In 2022, the municipality of Fomento had a population of 31,131. With a total area of 471 km^{2} (182 sq mi), it has a population density of 66/km^{2} (170/sq mi).

== Personalities ==
MLB All-Star Kendrys Morales was born in Fomento but spent the majority of his formative years in Havana.

== See also ==
- Municipalities of Cuba
- List of cities in Cuba
