= Manicaragua =

- Municipality
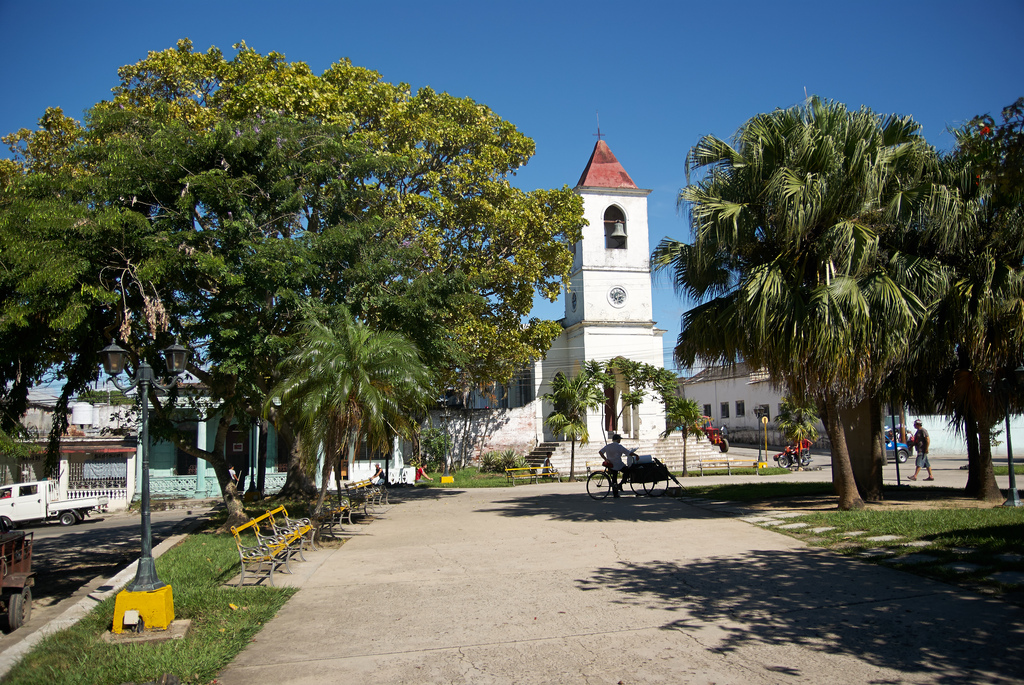
- Church and central square of Manicaragua

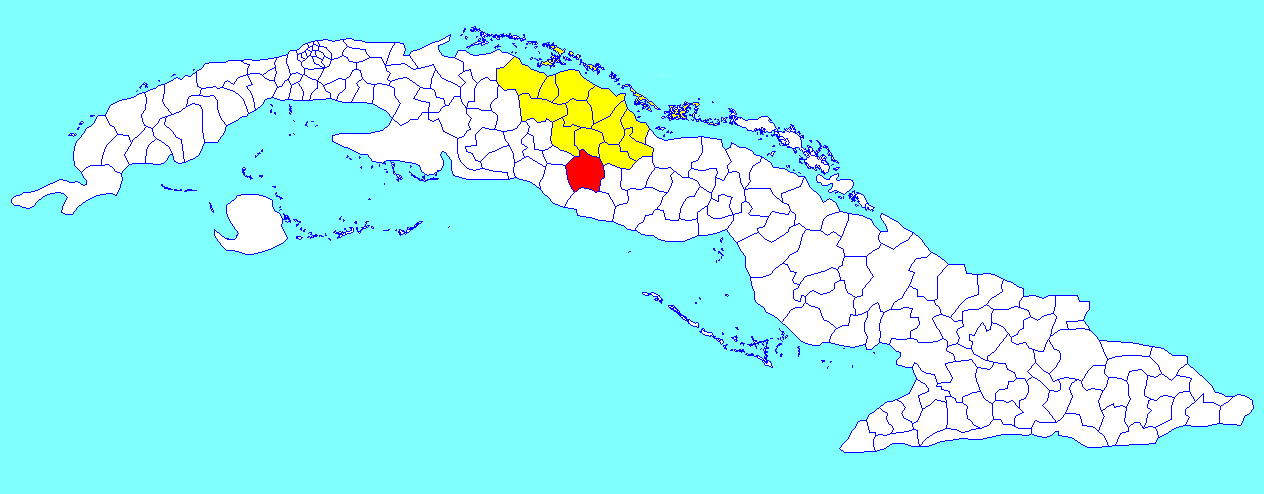
- Manicaragua municipality (red) within Villa Clara Province (yellow) and Cuba
- Coordinates: 22°09′0″N 79°58′35″W
- Country: Cuba
- Province: Villa Clara

Area
  - Total: 1,063 km^{2} (410 sq mi)
- Elevation: 150 m (490 ft)

Population (2022)
  - Total: 61,445
  - Density: 57.80/km^{2} (149.7/sq mi)
- Time zone: UTC-5 (EST)
- Area code: +53-422

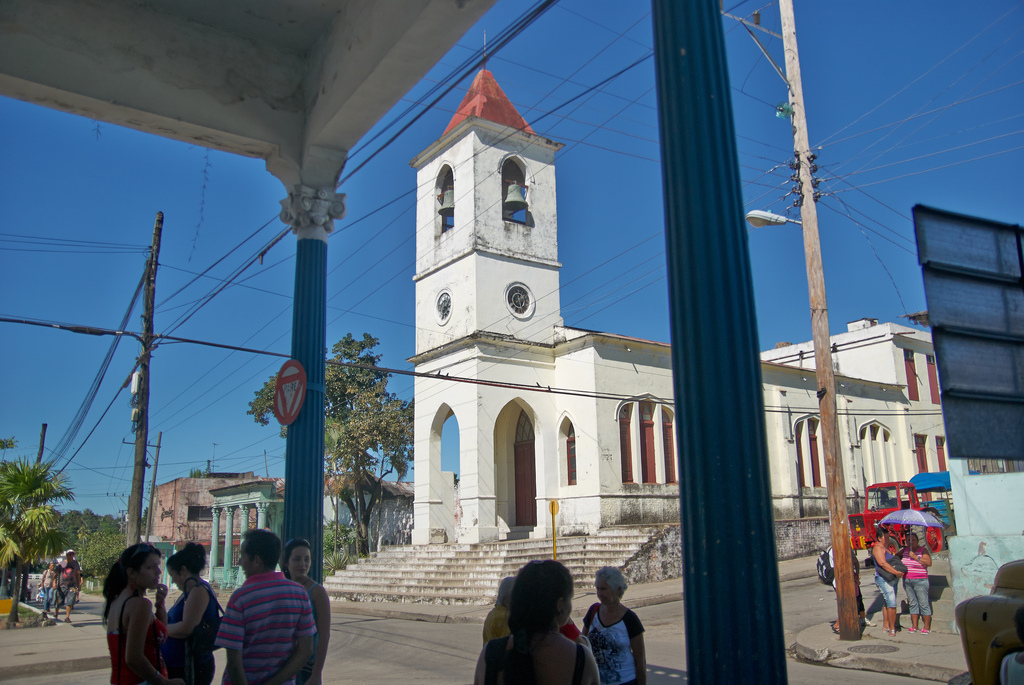
Church "Nuestra Señora del Carmen" of Manicaragua

Manicaragua (Spanish pronunciation: [manikaˈɾaɣwa]) is a municipality and mountain town in the Villa Clara Province of Cuba. It is located in the Escambray Mountains at the southern part of Villa Clara, bordering the provinces of Cienfuegos to the west and Sancti Spíritus to the east.

== History ==
The area was originally settled by the Siboney, a Taíno people native of Cuba. Some toponyms of settlements included in the municipality (as Manicaragua, Mataguá, Jibacoa etc.) have an Arawak origin.

== Geography ==
The municipality includes the town proper (with circa 23,000 inhabitants in 2003) and several villages as Arroyo Seco, El Mango, El Salto del Hanabanilla, Güinía de Miranda, Jibacoa, Jorobada, La Moza, Mataguá (the most populated one), Seibabo etc. It has areas of outstanding natural beauty and value as the Valley of Jibacoa, the Hanabanilla Lake, the dam, and the Hotel of the same name.

== Demographics ==
In 2004, the municipality of Manicaragua had a population of 73,370. With a total area of 1,063 km^{2} (410 sq mi), it has a population density of 69.0/km^{2} (179/sq mi). In 2022 the population had dropped to 61,445.

== Economy ==
Manicaragua is one of the four largest municipalities in Cuba. Main crops and source of income in this area include such items as tobacco and coffee. Coffee is grown in the slopes of El Escambray Mountains, a mountain ridge extending from the southeastern part of the Cienfuegos Province to neighboring Sancti Spíritus. Coffee beans from Manicaragua bear a flavorous unparallel nectar, though not known in the Western World due to the economic embargo. Not simingly, cigars made in the local factory, enjoy the popularity of many a tourist from different parts of the World. El Hoyo de Manicaragua, once known as the Land of the Best Tobacco in the World, is a small village located in this municipality. Its popularity faded after the crop was relocated to the western Cuban province of Pinar del Río, where many of the local campesinos were transferred due to their anti-Castro activities.

== Notable people ==
- Ofelia Domínguez Navarro (1894-1976), writer, teacher, lawyer, feminist and activist
- Juan Ramón Valdés Gómez (b. 1968), painter

== See also ==
- Municipalities of Cuba
- List of cities in Cuba
