= Armando de Armas (writer) =

Cuban writer and journalist

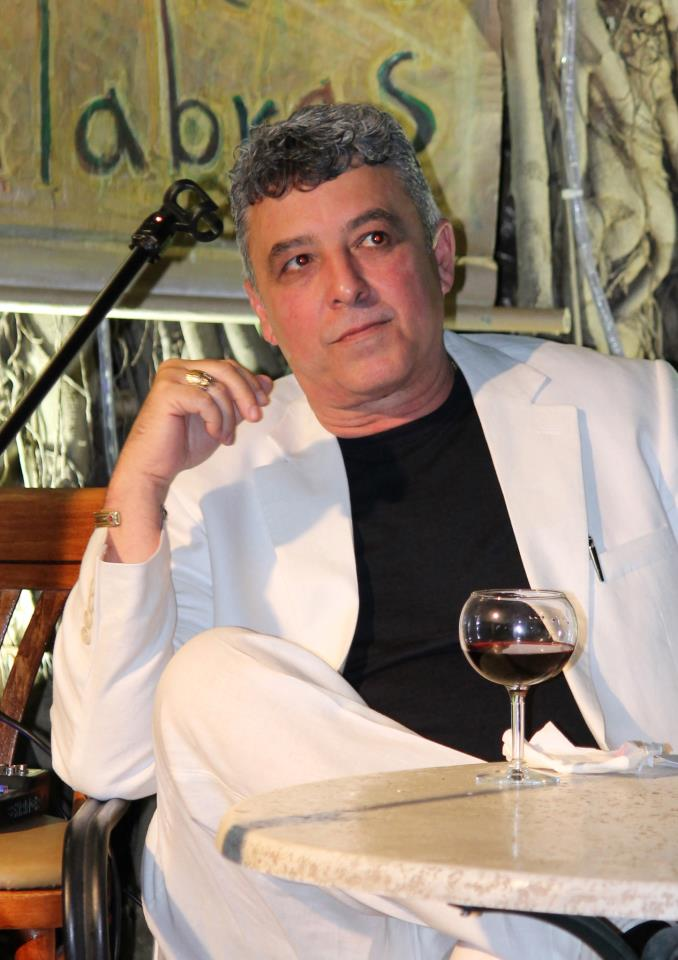
- Armando de Armas
- Born: October 15, 1958; Santa Clara, Cuba
- Died: October 8, 2024 (aged 65); Miami, Florida, United States
- Education: University "Marta Abreu" of Las Villas
- Occupations: Writer, Journalist
- Writing career
- Language: Spanish

Armando de Armas (October 15, 1958, Santa Clara, Cuba – October 8, 2024, Miami, United States) was a Cuban writer known for his novels, short stories, and essays, as well as his work as a journalist.

== Biography ==
De Armas was born in Santa Clara, Cuba, in 1958 and graduated with a degree in Philology from the University "Marta Abreu" of Las Villas. In the 1990s, he was a part of the human rights and independent culture movement that was developing on the island. In 1994, he escaped Cuba on a boat with a group of friends and received political asylum in the United States. The Berlin-based magazine Lettre International published an extensive chronicle of his escape from the island in 1999. On September 2, 1995, he survived the wreck of the shrimp boat "Sundown Two" in the Straits of Florida. The boat was part of a 25-boat "democracy flotilla" made up of Cuban exiles heading toward Havana as part of a protest against Fidel Castro.

In 1997, de Armas, along with fellow writers Ángel Cuadra, Indaniro Restano, Octavio Costa, and Reinaldo Bragado Bretaña, founded the "Cuban Writers in Exile Centre", a chapter of PEN International, with de Armas serving as vice president.

On August 31, 2007, he was part of a delegation of leaders from the Cuban exile community and United States Congress members that were invited by the Polish government to sign the "Agreement for Democracy in Cuba" with Polish president Lech Kaczyński in Lubin.

De Armas was also a contributor for Radio y Televisión Martí, where he ran the Arts & Culture section.

== Literary works ==
De Armas is the author of the novels La tabla (Fundación Hispano Cubana, Madrid in 2008) and Caballeros en el tiempo (Atmósfera Literaria, Madrid, 2013). He wrote various books of essays, including Mitos del antiexilio (Myths of the Antiexile), which was published in Miami in 2007 and was translated to Italian and English, and Los naipes en el espejo (Latin Heritage Foundation, New York, 2011).

His short story collections include Mala jugada (Miami, 1996) and Carga de la Caballería (Miami, 2006 and TheWriteDeal, 2012).

His stories, articles, and essays have appeared in numerous anthologies and have been translated into various languages around the world.

== Bibliography ==
- Mala jugada (1996)
- Carga de la Caballería (2006)
- Mitos del antiexilio (2007)
- La tabla (2008)
- Los naipes en el espejo (2011)
- Caballeros en el tiempo (2013)
