= Adela Hernández =

Cuban politician (born 1962)

- Born: 1962 (age 63–64)
- Occupation: Politician
- Years active: 2012-present
- Known for: First transgender person ever elected to political office in Cuba

Adela Hernández is a Cuban politician. Elected to the municipal council of Caibarién in the Villa Clara Province in November 2012, she is the first transgender person ever elected to political office in Cuba.

== Early life ==
In 1962, Hernández was born in a sugar town in central Cuba. Early on, Adela was interested in women’s clothing. Hernández had her first sexual contact “too young,” at the age of 7 with a 21-year-old man. Adela Hernández’s family disowned her.

At the age of 16, her father, a distillery worker, reported her to the police. She spent two years in prison in the 1980s on charges that Adela describes as “social dangerousness.”

== Gender Identity ==
When Adela Hernández entered office, she was still legally Jose Agustin Hernandez since she had not undergone sex-change surgery. However, on May 20, 2013, the first transgender woman received a photo ID since 1997 with her preferred name and gender identity without undergoing sex reassignment surgery. Adela Hernández expressed that she started the process of applying for a name change on her ID card.

== Career ==
She later worked as a hospital janitor, a nurse, an electrocardiogram technician, and a drag queen. She also became the head of the Committee for the Defense of the Revolution on her block and a member of the neighborhood watch committee.

Alberto Hernández, a farmer, nominated Adela because she was blunt and hardworking. Adela won in a run-off vote of 280 to 170. Hernández represented 2,000 residents of her neighborhood. In 2013, the neighborhood was routinely flooded and some houses experienced no running water. Adela got the authorities to provide running water at the local clinic, procured lights for the main street, and got the ration store to provide extra milk for the children. She was eligible for election to the National Assembly of People's Power in 2013, but she was not picked from a list of town councilors.
