= Hanabanilla Dam =

Dam and Reservoir in Cuba

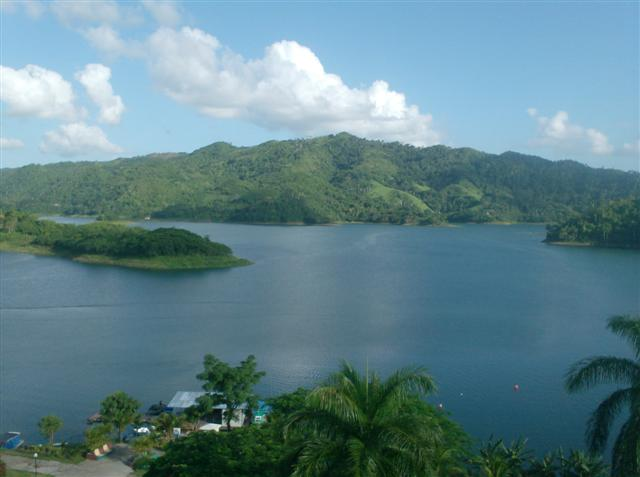
- Hanabanilla Lake

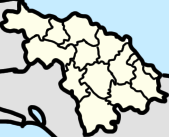
- Location within Cuba Location within Villa Clara Province
- Official name: Presa Hanabanilla
- Country: Cuba
- Location: El Salto del Hanabanilla, Villa Clara Province
- Coordinates: 22°5′39.39″N 80°4′2.66″W
- Purpose: Water supply, power
- Status: Operational
- Construction began: 1958
- Opening date: 1961; 65 years ago

Dam and spillways
- Type of dam: Embankment
- Impounds: Hanabanilla River
- Height: 46.5 m (153 ft)

Reservoir
- Total capacity: 286,000,000 m^{3} (232,000 acre⋅ft)
- Catchment area: 192 km^{2} (74 mi^{2})
- Surface area: 14.9 km^{2} (5.8 mi^{2})

Power Station
- Commission date: 1963
- Turbines: 3 x 14.3 MW Francis-type
- Installed capacity: 43 MW

The Hanabanilla Dam is an embankment dam on the Hanabanilla River near the village of El Salto del Hanabanilla in Villa Clara Province, Cuba. The purpose of the dam is to provide water for irrigation and municipal uses and to generate hydroelectric power.

== Overview ==
The dam withholds a reservoir of 286,000,000 m^{3} (232,000 acre⋅ft) and the power station, located near its base, has an installed capacity of 43 MW. It is the largest hydroelectric power station in the country. Near the southern end of the reservoir is Jibacoa Dam, an auxiliary dam, which closes off one valley to create the existing large reservoir.

The dam was constructed between 1958 and 1961. The power station was commissioned in 1963. In March 2014 a rehabilitation of the power station began.

== See also ==
- Escambray Mountains
- Manicaragua
