= Topes de Collantes =

Mountain and nature reserve in Cuba

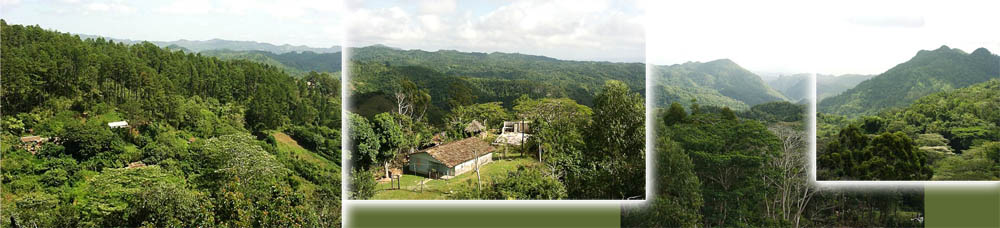
- Topes de Collantes
- Interactive map of Topes de Collantes
- Location: Cuba
- Nearest city: Trinidad
- Coordinates: 21°53′N 80°00′W

Topes de Collantes is a nature reserve park in the Escambray Mountains range in Cuba. It also refers to the third highest peak in the reserve, where a small settlement and tourist center is located, all sharing the same name.

== Geography ==
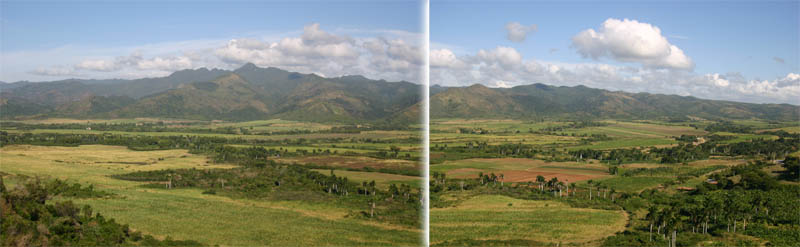
Valley of the sugar mills at the south skirts of Escambray Mountains

Topes de Collantes, literally Collantes’ Highs, almost 800 metres (2,600 ft) above sea level, along with Potrerillo peak, 931 metres (3,054 ft) and tallest San Juan peak, 1,140 metres (3,740 ft) are located in the Escambray range. These mountains are shared by the three central provinces of the island; Villa Clara Province to the north, Cienfuegos Province and Sancti Spiritus Province to the west and east respectively.

The wet winds coming off the Atlantic Ocean have made the north face of the mountains a luxurious refuge for plants and animals, while the drier south face hosts important ecosystems, in which lie two famous UNESCO World Heritage sites; Valle de los Ingenios (Valley of the Sugar Mills), and Trinidad city, both living examples of early 17th-century wealthy colonial Cuba.

== Nature ==
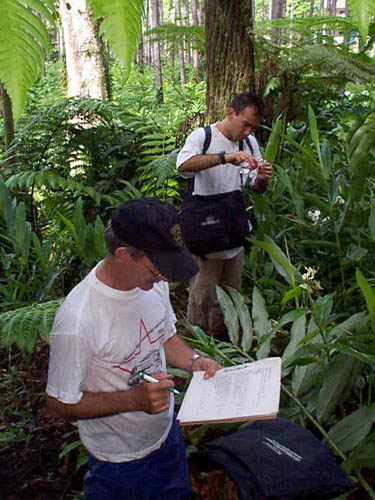
Mariposa species in the tropical rainforest

Nature is the big attraction here. Caves, rivers, falls, grottos, canyons, natural pools with crystal clear water, mountain hills surrounded by mariposa (butterfly lily, Hedychium coronarium) Cuba’s national flower announcing their presence with a soft unique flagrance from June to early September. More than 40 indigenous species of orchids and 100 species of ferns, of which 7 are 6 metres (20 ft) tall palm-like tree ferns, wild plantain and banana trees, jasmine, begonias, several representatives of the ginger family and around 40 species of coffee are growing under the shade of giant 40-meter-tall (130 ft) pines, eucalyptus, West Indian mahogany (Swietenia mahagoni) and magnolias making the wonder of this tropical rainforest.

Important animal species live here as well. They include the Cartacuba (Todus multicolor), Cuban ivory-billed woodpecker (Campephilus principalis bairdii), unique hummingbirds, and the tocororo (Priotelus temnurus), which is Cuba's national bird.

== History ==
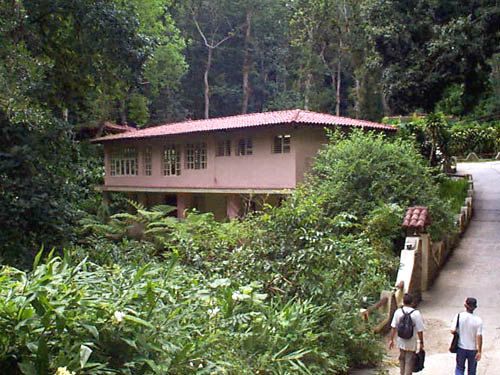
La Represa Park, Martha Batista's house

Coffee growers were living in the area when president Fulgencio Batista ordered the construction of a massive battleship-like Art Deco sanatorium for tuberculosis patients in 1954. Rumor has it that his wife Martha was battling against this illness and once there she fell in love for the place. As a result she persuaded Batista to build her a cottage in the area as well. After the Revolution the hospital was converted into a school, and in the mid-1970s it was returned to a similar use as a hotel specialized in rehabilitation and special therapies. The Kurhotel is also famous for its vast collection of original Cuban art. Scattered in its 210 rooms, lobbies and halls, almost 800 pieces of art from the most famous Cuban painters of all times can be found. As a result, a small worker’s settlement was developed around the place. The Universidad de Montaña or Mountain Campus of Las Villas University was built here in the 1980s. Due to its connection with Trinidad city and the beaches of the Ancon peninsula a couple more hotels and a resort villa catering to tourist have been developed.

== Attractions ==
Almacigo tree (Bursera simaruba) in Ancon beach, Trinidad

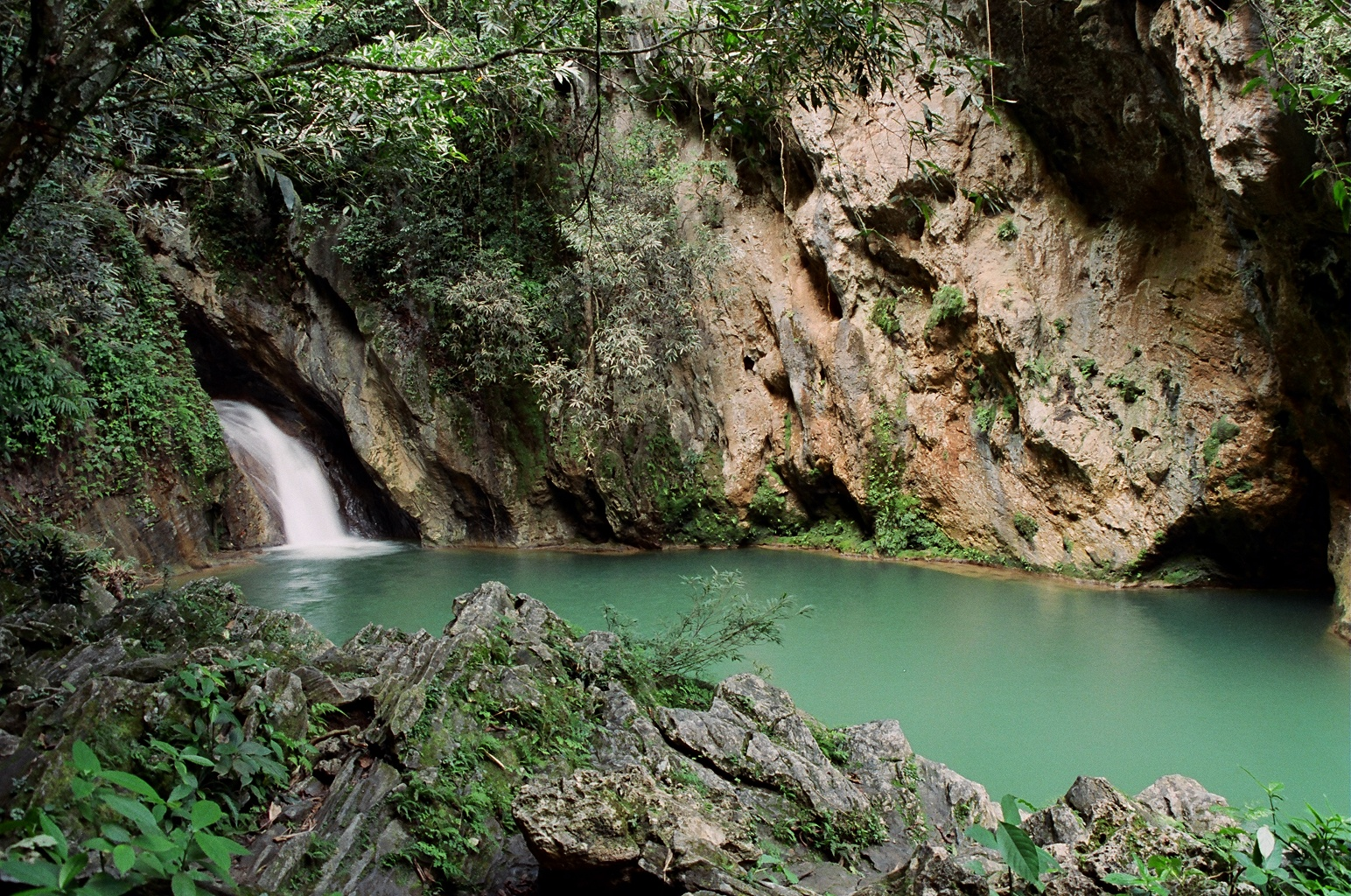
One of the many naturals pools in Caburni river

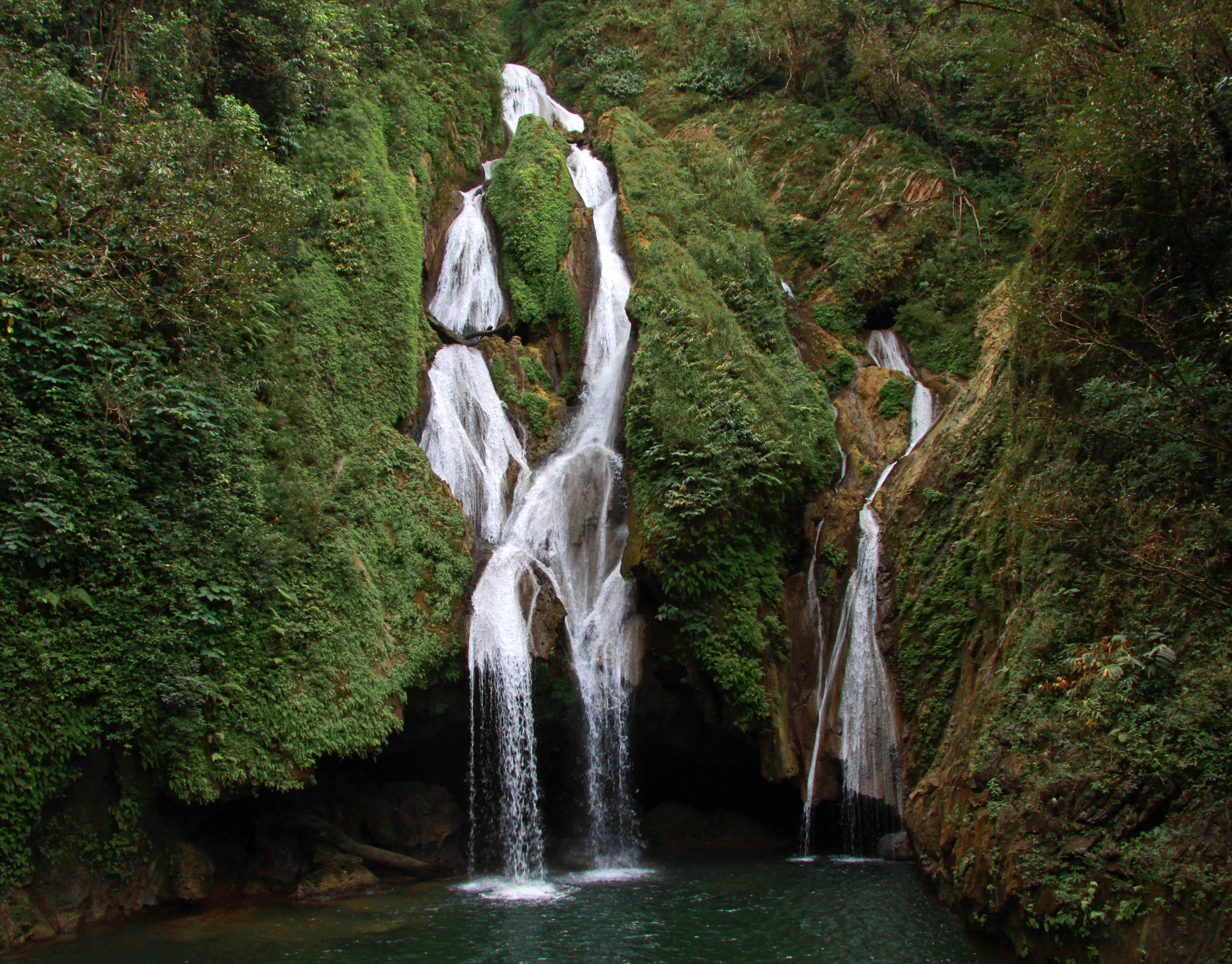
Waterfalls

There are several places to go, these are some of the most popular trips:

Caburni Falls, at about 3 kilometres (1.9 mi) is the most popular hike through coffee plantations, traditional farmers houses, and cliffs to end in Caburni river which falls from a 62 metres (203 ft) rock wall into a series of ponds.

La Batata, 3 kilometres (1.9 mi) from the city, offers scenic views as well, ending in an underground river-cave system with several levels of natural ponds.

Hacienda Codina, a ranch with several attractions: medicinal mud baths, medicinal and ornamental gardens, the orchid’s collection has more than 40 local species including bamboo; Altar’s cave from where a secret passage ends in a natural lookout facing south of the mountain system and the Valley of the sugar mills, Trinidad and Ancon can be seen.

Paseo Ecologico, Ecology walk, 1 kilometre (0.62 mi) local path connecting the Kurhotel with hotel “Los helechos” filled with mariposa shrubs and arborescent ferns under the canopy of pines and eucalyptus.

Parque La represa, a 1 square kilometre (0.39 sq mi) park developed around the original house built for Batista’s wife Martha. Placed on the banks of River Vega Grande, there is an arboretum with more than 300 exotic species. The highest and oldest mahogany ever found in Cuba lives in this place.

Snak Bar “El mirador”, literally The Lookout, it in the way down to Trinidad, between the Valley and the range in the back, but still 600 meters above sea level offers views of the city and peninsula below.

With around 500 years of history in its stone built streets and colonial architecture the UNESCO’s World Heritage Site of Trinidad is located close to the white sands and blue waters of Ancon and La Boca beaches.
