= Escambray Mountains =

Mountain range of Cuba

Escambray
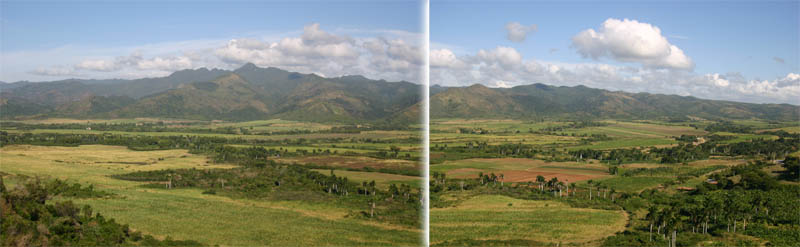
- South side of Escambray in Sancti Spíritus Province with Valley of the Sugar Mills at the front.

Highest point
- Peak: Pico San Juan
- Elevation: 1,140 m (3,740 ft)
- Coordinates: 21°59′25.08″N 80°8′50.28″W

Geography
- Location within Cuba
- Country: Cuba
- Provinces: Villa Clara; Cienfuegos; Sancti Spíritus
- Range coordinates: 21°59′05″N 80°07′57″W

The Escambray Mountains (Spanish: Sierra del Escambray) are a mountain range in the central region of Cuba, in the provinces of Sancti Spíritus, Cienfuegos and Villa Clara.

== Overview ==
The Escambray Mountains are located in the south-central region of the island, extending about 80 kilometers (50 mi) from east to west, and 80 kilometers (50 mi) from north to south. Their highest peak, Pico San Juan, rises to 960 m (3,150 ft) above sea level. The Escambray range is divided into two sections by the Agabama River. The western part is called the Guamuhaya Mountains, and the eastern part, raising between Trinidad and Sancti Spiritus, is best known as Sierra de Sancti Spíritus. After Pico San Juan, the highest points are Caballete de Casas, Gavilanes, Loma de Banao, Caja de Agua, and Pico Tuerto.

Topes de Collantes is a nature reserve park established in the south-eastern ranges of Escambray Mountains, protecting and showcasing caves, rivers, waterfalls, and canyons. The Valley de los Ingenios is developed at the south-eastern foot of the mountains, and is a UNESCO World Heritage Site.

The mountains were the theater of the Escambray rebellion in 1959–1965. It was also a planned refuge during the Bay of Pigs Invasion; however, it was never used as such.

== Gallery ==
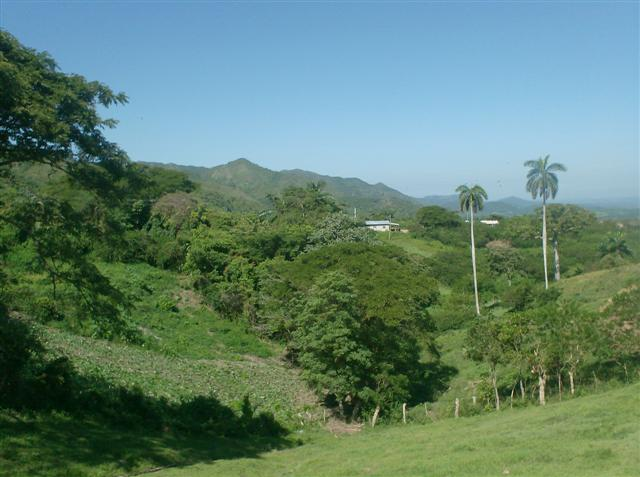
Escambray near Hanabanilla lake in Villa Clara Province

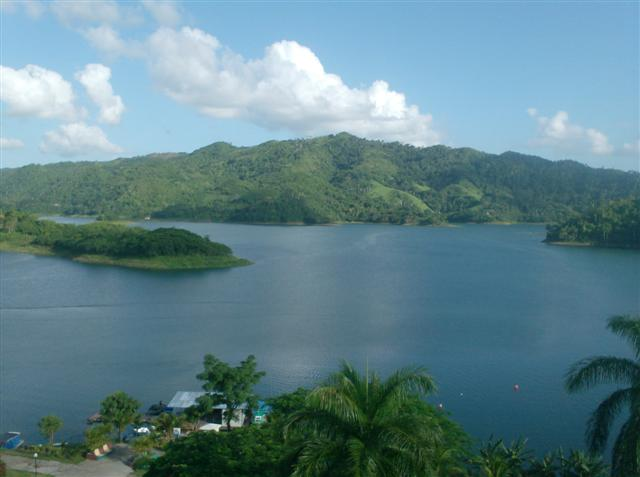
The Hanabanilla lake is at 364 meters over sea level and averages 40 meters deep.

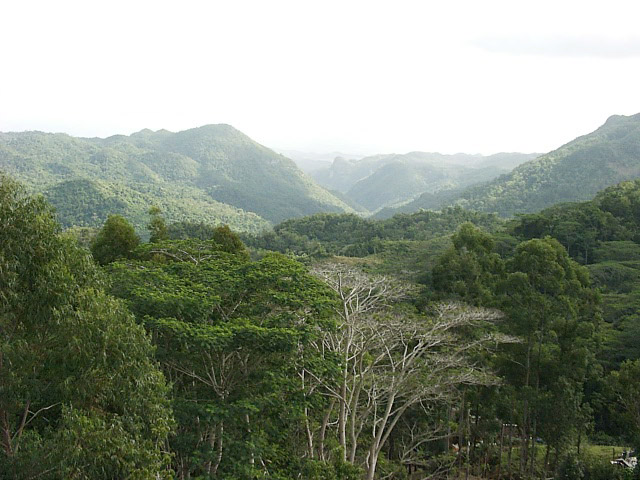
Tropical rain forest near in the heart of Topes de Collantes, Sancti Spíritus Province

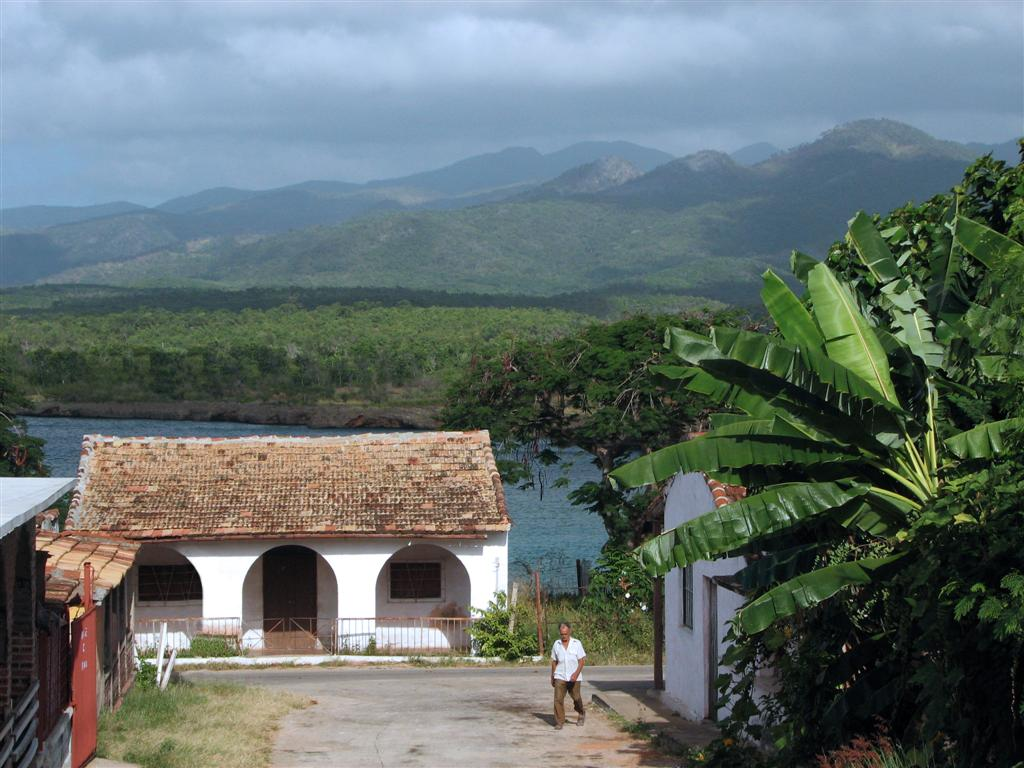
La Boca fisherman's village near Trinidad with Escambray at the back

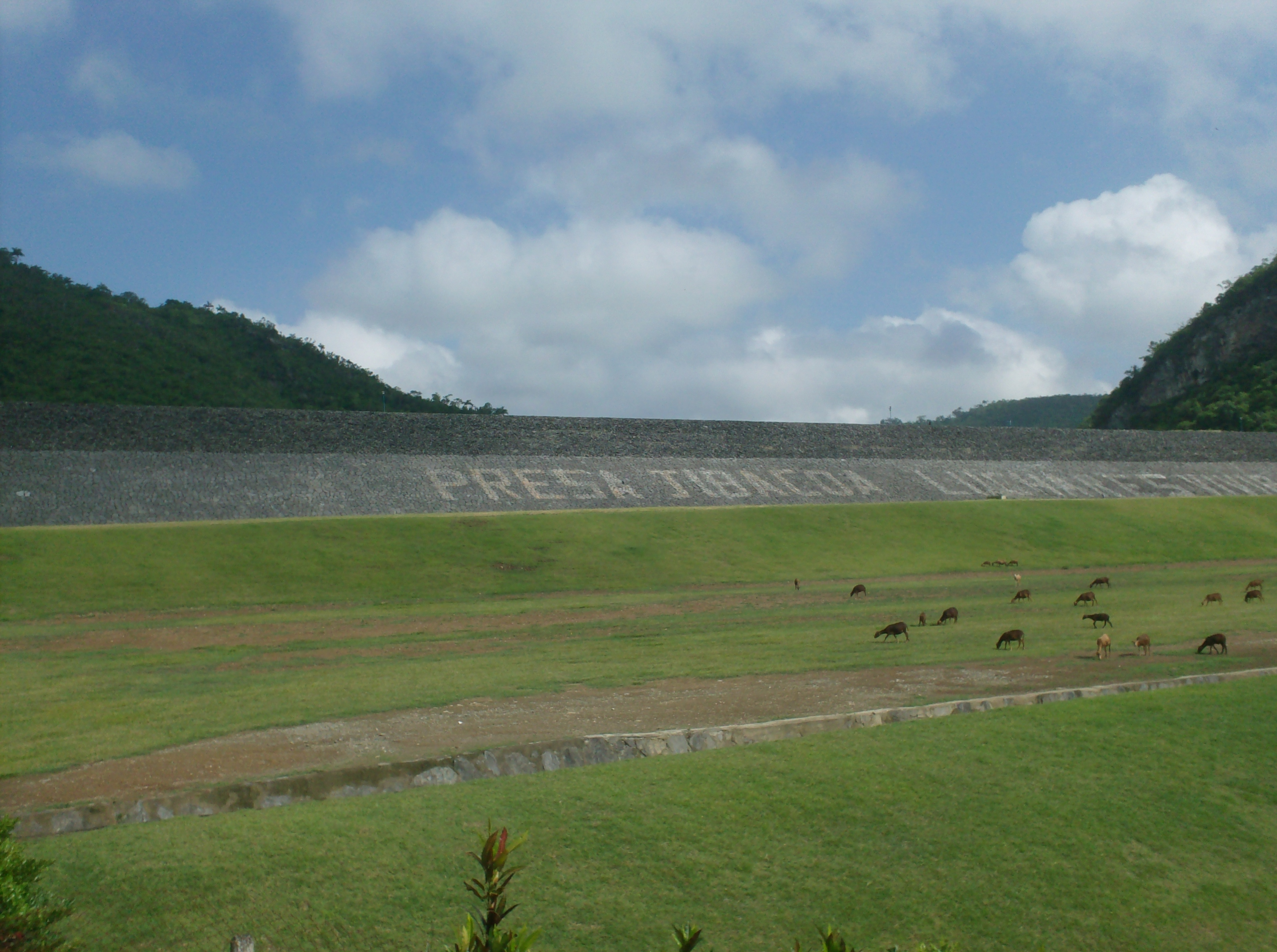
Hanabanilla lake wall, in the village of Jibacoa, in Villa Clara, Escambray.

== See also ==
- Geography of Cuba
