= Villa Clara Province =

Province of Cuba

- Province of Cuba
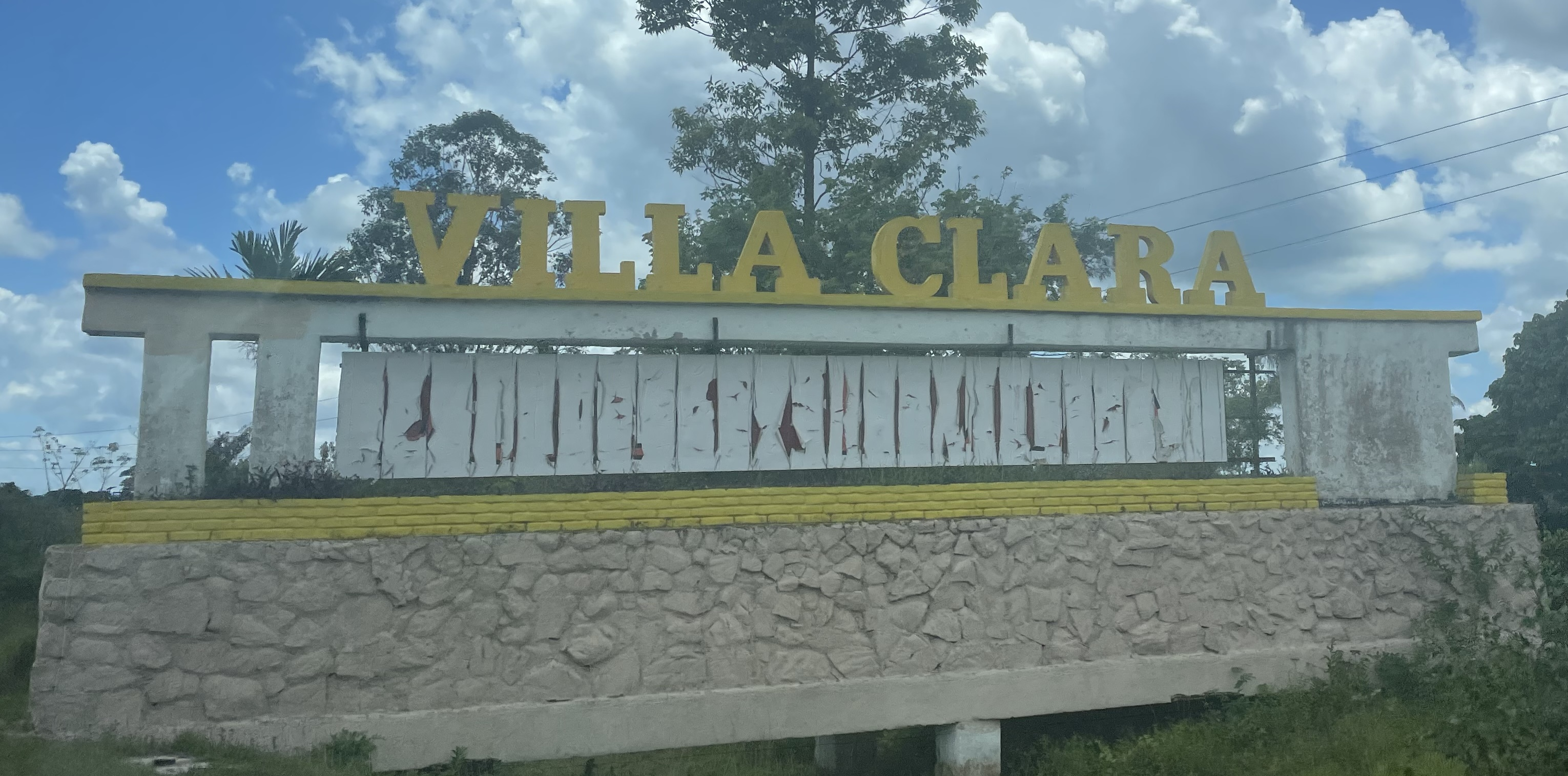
- Sign seen when entering the province.

- Coat of arms

- Country: Cuba
- Capital: Santa Clara

Government
  - Governor: Milaxy Yanet Sánchez Armas
  - Vice-Governor: Noel Cecilio Chinea

Area
  - Total: 8,413.13 km^{2} (3,248.33 sq mi)

Population (2010-12-31)
  - Total: 803,562
  - Density: 95.5128/km^{2} (247.377/sq mi)
- Time zone: UTC-5 (EST)
- HDI (2019): 0.768 high · 11th of 16
- Website: https://www.soyvillaclara.gob.cu/es/

Villa Clara is one of the provinces of Cuba. It is located in the central region of the island bordering on the Atlantic Ocean to the north, Matanzas Province to the west, Sancti Spiritus Province to the east, and Cienfuegos Province to the South. Villa Clara shares with Cienfuegos and Sancti Spiritus on the south the Escambray Mountain Range. Its main cities are Santa Clara (the capital), Remedios, Sagua La Grande, Camajuani, Caibarién, Ranchuelo, Placetas, and Manicaragua.

== History ==
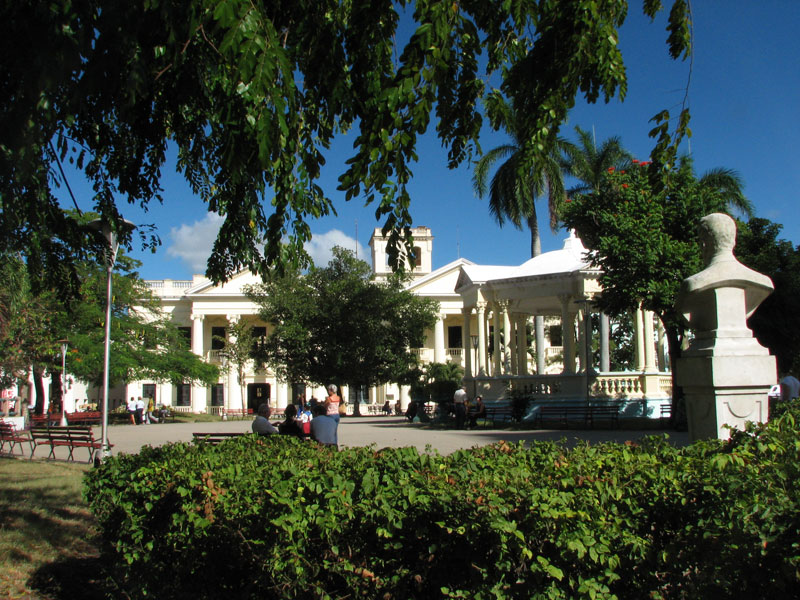
Vidal Park in Santa Clara

Prior to 1976, the current provinces of Cienfuegos, Sancti Spíritus, and Villa Clara were all part of the now obsolete province of Las Villas, but Villa Clara is still referred some times just as "Las Villas" using the shorter old name. Santa Clara was the capital of historical Las Villas and still capital of Villa Clara province. That old name itself, Spanish for "The Cities", refers to the four original 16th and 17th-century cities founded in this vast territory: San Juan de los Remedios, Sancti Spíritus, Santísima Trinidad and Gloriosa Santa Clara.

During pre-Spanish settlement in Cuba, what now is Villa Clara province was populated by Taíno people with chieftains of Sabanaque (north west), Sabana (north east), and Cubanacan, literally "The Middle Land" in the center where Santa Clara city is located nowadays. In this region from the eastern landing point of the Spanish was where Columbus believed the "King of India" was living.

In early colonial Cuba, historical province Las Villas was center to cattle industry but by the 18th and 19th centuries it had shifted to sugar production with a large concentration of mills. At the beginning of the 20th century, it had the highest percentage of land farms (90%). In 1950 it was second to Havana in manufacturing establishments.

After Castro's revolution in the 1960s it still led in sugar production on the island, but in the late 80s and 90s after the collapse of the Soviet Union and lack of support thereof, most of the already inefficient mills were closed down, some of them disassembled, while others became museums. Only the most efficient mills are still producing sugar. Since then the province concentrated its efforts on building beach resorts.

The country's first transgender municipal delegate was elected in Villa Clara in early 2013. Adela Hernandez is a resident of the town of Caibarien and works as a nurse electrocardiogram specialist.

== Economy ==
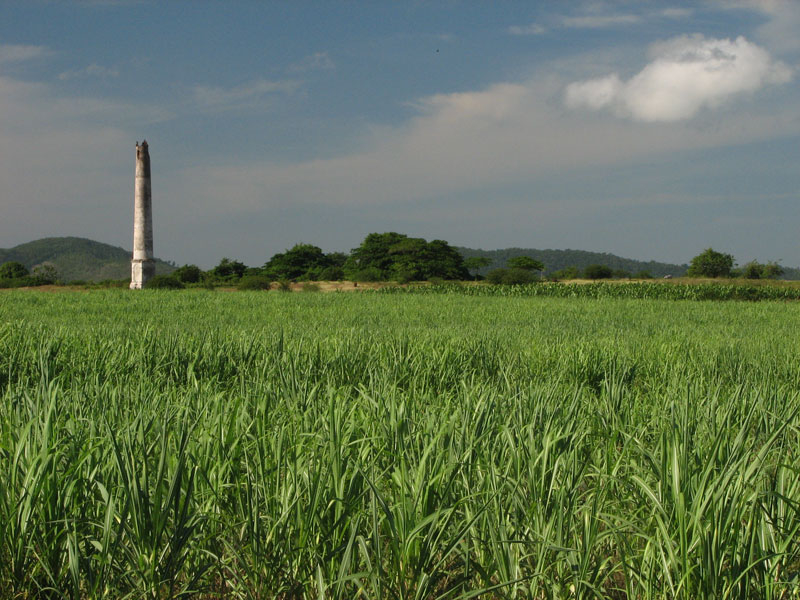
Sugarcane plantations in Villa Clara

Sugar, the commodity that the Cuban economy once relied upon, was primarily based in the plains in the north of the province, and several large mills provided employment to many people. Now in the newly restructured Cuban economy, most of these mills have been abandoned and the economy is instead focused on newly built beach resorts in the north cays. Sugar and tobacco are still the two most important agricultural commodities of the province.

== Geography ==
The northern coast of Villa Clara is dotted with numerous cays (part of the Sabana-Camaguey Archipelago), and there are many coral reefs, sandy beaches, and newly constructed touristic resorts.

The Cays are a capricious cluster of some 500 islands, strewn along a sea of varying shades of blues and greens off the northern coast of the central province of Villa Clara and close to the second largest coral barrier reef in the world. It is a tropical paradise with more than 17 km of fine-white sand beaches.

The Villa Clara Cays cover more than 77,844 hectares and support approximately 248 plant species. Major cays in the area include Cayo Las Brujas, Cayo Ensenachos and Cayo Santa Maria. The cays are connected to the Cuban mainland near Caibarien, by a 48 km causeway with 46 bridges designed to maintain water circulation between marine areas.

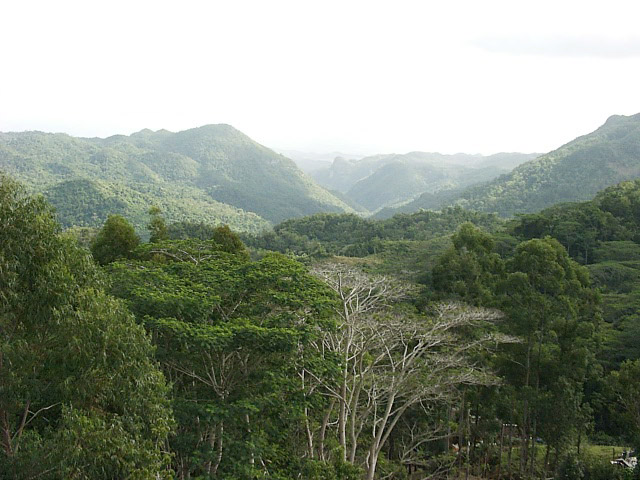
Escambray Mountains

There are smaller airfields near most of the main towns, plus a small international terminal in Cayo Las Brujas for the operation of small and medium size charter aircraft.

Villa Clara Cays, located approximately 300 km from Havana, are part of the Jardines del Rey archipelago, the largest archipelago surrounding Cuba which extends 465 km along the northern coast of the country.

A site of legends, it is said that this island, maze of singular biodiversity, was once a haven for pirates and buccaneers ready to pounce on ship passing along Cuba's shores.

Cayo Las Brujas takes its name from an old legend about a young couple whose love was thwarted by a jealous uncle, who in turn is the namesake of another islet: Cayo Borracho, which means drunkard. The remains of the San Pascual, a ship that ran aground many years ago, can be observed a mile away from the cay. Built in San Francisco, California and launched in 1919, the ship evokes the presence of American writer Ernest Hemingway in the area. From its deck, Cuban painter Leopoldo Romañach found inspiration for some of his famous marine landscapes.

Cayo Ensenachos is the smallest of the three cays but is a refuge for 22 endemic plants and 39 wildlife species. Shaped like a horseshoe, the islet was originally an aboriginal settlement. The beach is always calm due to the position of the cay which prevents the large waves from hitting the shore with force.

Cayo Santa María is also known as the White Rose of Jardines del Rey. The cay was named after the flagship of Christopher Columbus's fleet on his maiden voyage to the New World. Legend has it that this strip of land -some 13 km long and 2 km in width - is said to be haunted by the spirit of Rosa Maria Coraje, a woman who hid aboard a ship in a desperate attempt to find both paradise and her beloved. She landed on the cay and managed to survive hiding in the marshes, among the mangroves and feeding on fish, until she finally discovered her dearly loved in a neighboring cay.

Around Santa Clara, the land rises into the Alturas de Santa Clara. The highest point in the Santa Clara region is in the Alturas, at 464 m (1,522 ft) above sea level, while the south, dominated by the Escambray Mountains, reach elevations of over 900 m (3,000 ft). Villa Clara also has numerous lakes, which are used for both water sports and fishing. The largest Cuban river to drain into the Atlantic, Río Sagua la Grande, is also in Villa Clara province.

== Municipalities ==
Municipality	Population (2022)	Area (km^{2})	Location	Image
Caibarién	40,798	212	22.51583°N 79.47222°W	_
Camajuaní	57,142	614	22.46806°N 79.72361°W	_
Cifuentes	26,135	512	22.62083°N 80.06583°W	
Corralillo	24,791	843	22.98583°N 80.58278°W	
Encrucijada	31,500	345	22.61722°N 79.86611°W	
Manicaragua	61,445	1,063	22.15028°N 79.97611°W	Church and central square in Manicaragua, Cuba
Placetas	65,379	601	22.31611°N 79.65528°W	_
Quemado de Güines	20,533	338	22.79000°N 80.25583°W	
Ranchuelo	50,708	556	22.33611°N 80.11278°W	City Hall of Ranchuelo, Cuba
Remedios	42,134	560	22.49222°N 79.54556°W	Oldest city of Villa Clara province, established in 1513
Sagua la Grande	49,986	661	22.80889°N 80.07083°W	_
Santa Clara	245,959	514	22.40556°N 79.95389°W	Provincial capital
Santo Domingo	46,984	883	22.58361°N 80.23833°W	-

Source: Estimate from 2022. Area from 1976 municipal re-distribution.

== Demographics ==
In 2004, the province of Villa Clara had a population of 817,070. With a total area of 8,412.41 km^{2} (3,248.05 sq mi), the province had a population density of 97.1/km^{2} (251/sq mi).

== Notable residents ==
- Marta Abreu, benefactress
- Rolando Arrojo, baseball player
- José Bernal, artist
- Jose Braulio Aleman, general, Spanish–American War
- Yandy Díaz, baseball player
- Miguel Díaz-Canel, 17th president of Cuba since 2019
- Mario Garcia, newspaper and magazine designer, born in Placetas, Las Villa
- Rubén González, pianist
- Adela Hernández, Cuba's first transsexual municipal delegate
- Liván Hernández, baseball player
- Orlando Hernández, baseball player
- Wifredo Lam, painter
- Moraima Secada, singer
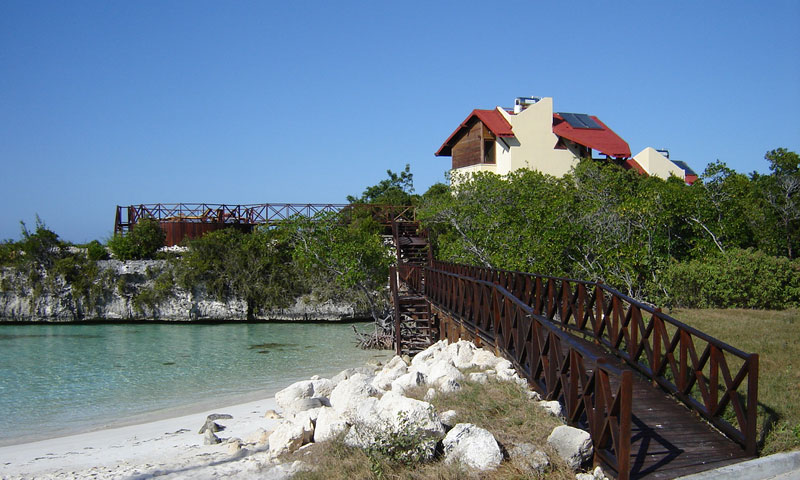
Las Brujas Beach

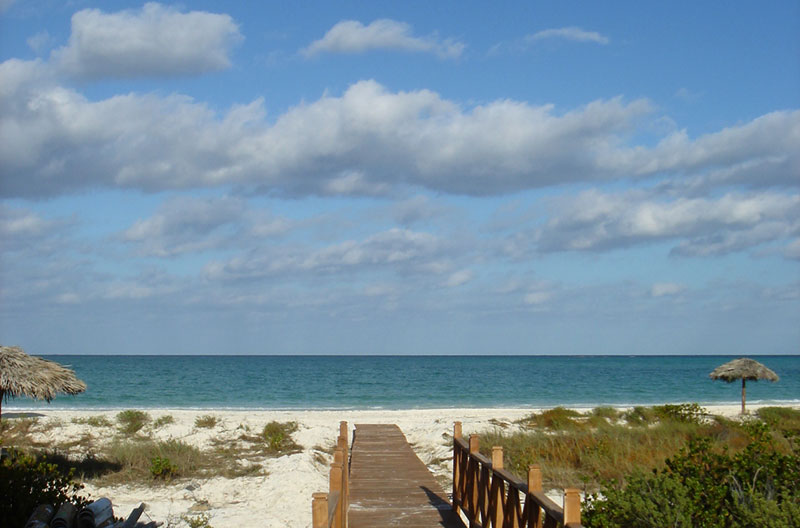
Santa Maria Cay and Beach

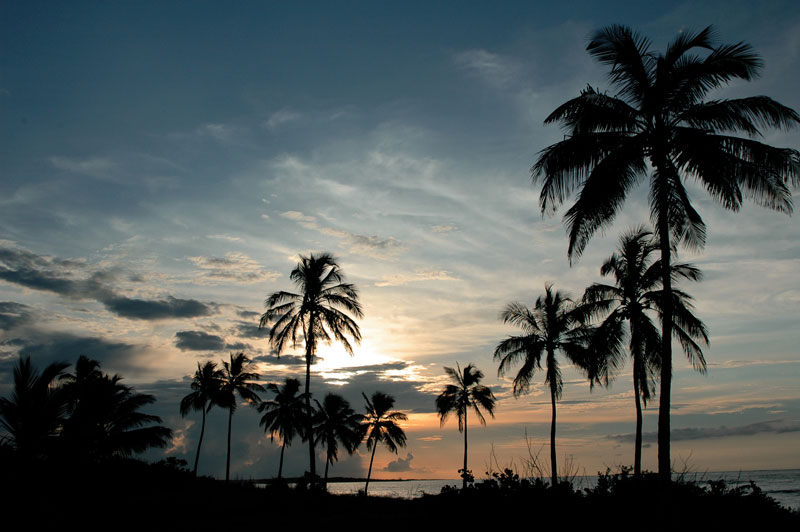
Ensenachos Beach

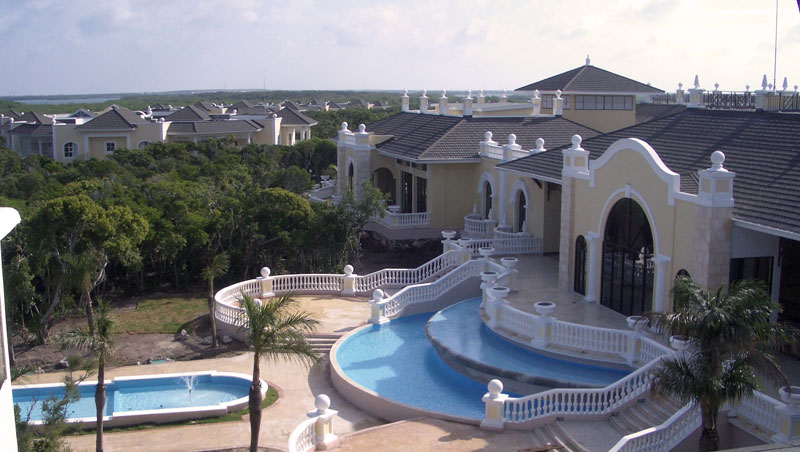
Resort at Ensenachos Cay

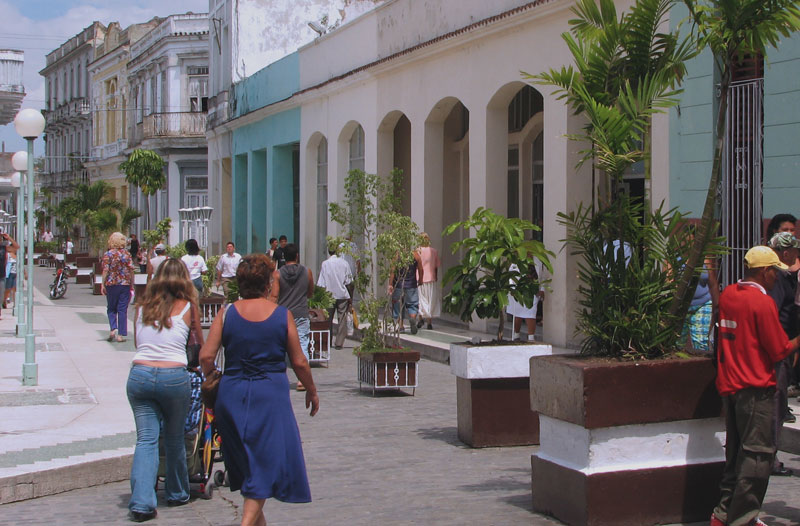
Santa Clara's pedestrian boulevard

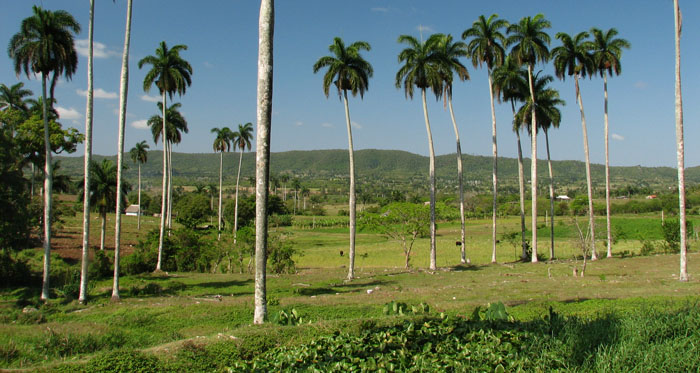
Camajuaní Valley

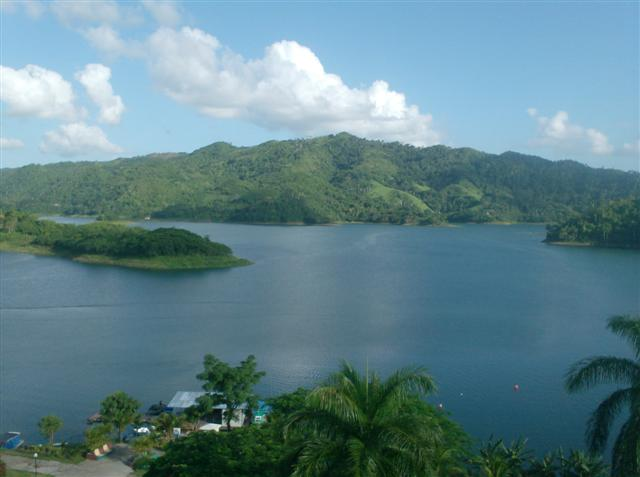
El Salto del Hanabanilla and Hanabanilla Lake

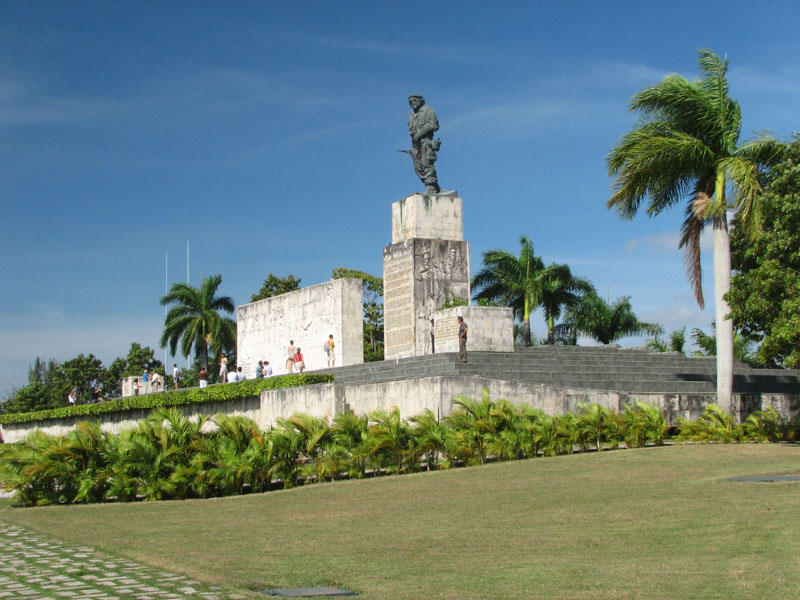
Che Guevara Mausoleum

== See also ==
- Second National Front of Escambray
