= Palmetum of Santa Cruz de Tenerife =

Botanical garden in Canary Islands, Spain

Coordinates: 28°27′07″N 16°15′21″W

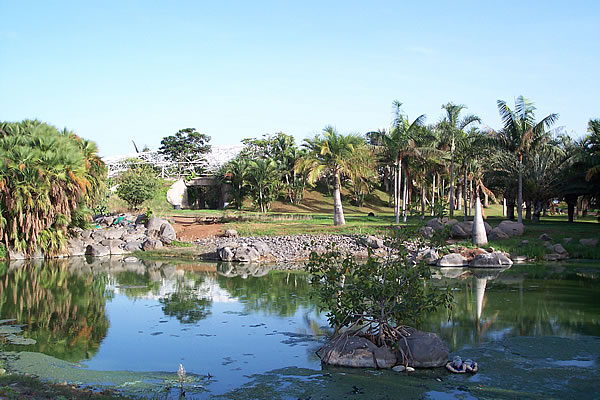
Palmetum, Santa Cruz de Tenerife

The Palmetum of Santa Cruz de Tenerife is a 120,000 m^{2} (30 acres) botanical garden specializing in palms (Arecaceae). It is situated on an artificial hill overlooking the ocean in Santa Cruz de Tenerife, Canary Islands, Spain. The gardens feature a system of waterfalls, streams, and ponds, as well as a museum dedicated to palms and a display shade house. The project began in 1995 on a former landfill site and opened to the public in 2014.

The collection includes approximately 600 palm species, with a focus on those native to islands around the world. Other trees and shrubs from different plant families are also displayed, arranged into biogeographical sections. The gardens are maintained without the use of pesticides or fertilizers, and various species of wild birds are commonly observed within the grounds.

== Location ==
The Palmetum is located in Santa Cruz de Tenerife, the capital of the western Canary Islands, in the district of Cabo Llanos, adjacent to the Parque Marítimo César Manrique. It is situated on an artificial hill originally formed from a former municipal landfill near the ocean. The average annual temperature is 21.7 °C (71.1 °F), and the lowest recorded temperature is 13 °C (55.4 °F).

== History ==
The former landfill was closed in 1983. The creation of the gardens began in 1995 with funding from the European Union and the City of Santa Cruz de Tenerife. The project was developed under the botanical direction of agronomist Manuel Caballero Ruano and biologist Carlo Morici. Landscape designer Carlos Simón oversaw the construction of several lakes and waterfalls, as well as the planting of the first gardens between 1996 and 1999.

Development was halted in 2000 due to a lack of funding and was maintained only at a basic level until 2006. Major works resumed in 2007 and 2008, including the replacement of the irrigation system and landscaping of the unfinished southern slopes. The living collections were expanded and reorganized, and new biogeographical sections were established.

Further improvements were carried out between 2010 and 2011, including the construction of the entrance building and the hardscape elements such as roads and circular areas. Although the park remained closed to the public, guided tours were introduced in 2013. The Palmetum was officially inaugurated in 2014 by the Princes of Spain and was designated as a botanical garden in 2015. It is now open daily and attracts both local visitors and tourists, offering educational programs and maintaining regular exchanges with other institutions.

== Buildings and facilities ==
- Entrance building: The entrance building includes a reception area with a small shop and an exhibition hall featuring a palm museum. Offices are located on the upper floor. A tower with a spiral staircase and an elevator connects the entrance area to a bridge leading into the gardens.
- El Octógono: Known as El Octógono ("The Octagon"), this half-sunken shade house covers 2,300 m^{2} (24,757 ft^{2}) and is designed to host the most delicate species. It features a dense display of tropical plants intersected by winding paths, streams, bridges, and waterfalls.
- Ethnographical Palm Museum: The Ethnographical Palm Museum is a semi-subterranean structure, partly covered with vegetation. The building remains unfinished and closed to the public. It is intended to house a collection of palm-related artefacts, dry specimens, and a lecture room.
- Plant Nursery Complex: Designed by Jorge Díaz Studio and Equipo Olivares Arquitectos, the plant nursery complex supports scientific research and horticultural activities. The nurseries are organized along a transverse paved corridor, which connects service buildings and offices while separating different functional areas. Each nursery is configured with specific conditions of humidity, light, and ventilation. The plot faces south along a mountain slope, offering views of the ocean and the eastern coast of Tenerife. The layout respects the site's existing topography, positioning four slightly rotated containers along the platform formed by a previous retaining wall, leaving narrow service corridors and shaded work areas that enhance ventilation and reduce sun exposure.

== Living collections ==
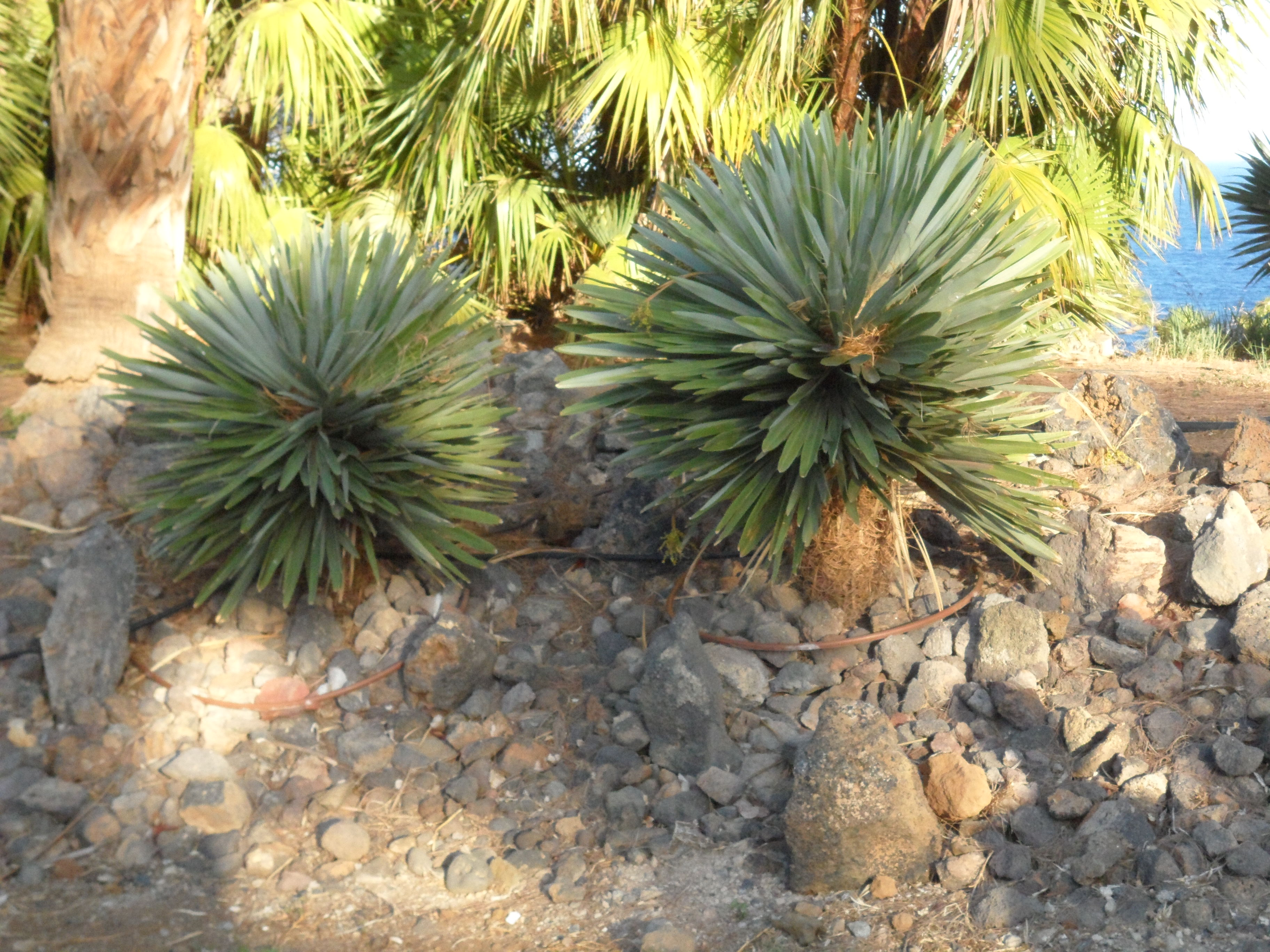
Hemithrinax ekmaniana in the Caribbean section

As of 2016, the plant collection included at least 1,853 plant taxa, with an emphasis on island floras. Of these, 420 taxa are listed on the IUCN Red List, including 73 classified as critically endangered and 2 as extinct in the wild.

The palm collection comprises 573 taxa, of which 163 are represented by at least one mature specimen. A total of 192 palm taxa are listed on the IUCN Red List, with 38 categorized as critically endangered. Forty-two of these IUCN-listed palms have reached maturity within the garden.

Other well-represented plant families include Amaryllidaceae, Asparagaceae, Apocynaceae, Bromeliaceae, Fabaceae, Malvaceae, and Moraceae.

The collection emphasizes palms native to islands, with Caribbean species being the most prominent. The collections of Thrinax, Coccothrinax, and Hemithrinax are among the most comprehensive in the world. They have been developed through numerous field expeditions and collaborations with botanical institutions in the Caribbean, including the National Botanical Garden of Havana, the Cienfuegos Botanical Garden, and Las Tunas in Cuba, as well as the Montgomery Botanical Center in Miami and the National Botanical Garden of Santo Domingo.

Several taxa are cultivated in sufficient numbers to enable ex situ conservation through seed production of IUCN-listed species. A notable example is Coccothrinax borhidiana, a slow-growing and critically endangered species represented at the Palmetum by 17 specimens germinated in 1996, which now produce fruit in the Caribbean section.

== Biogeographical sections ==
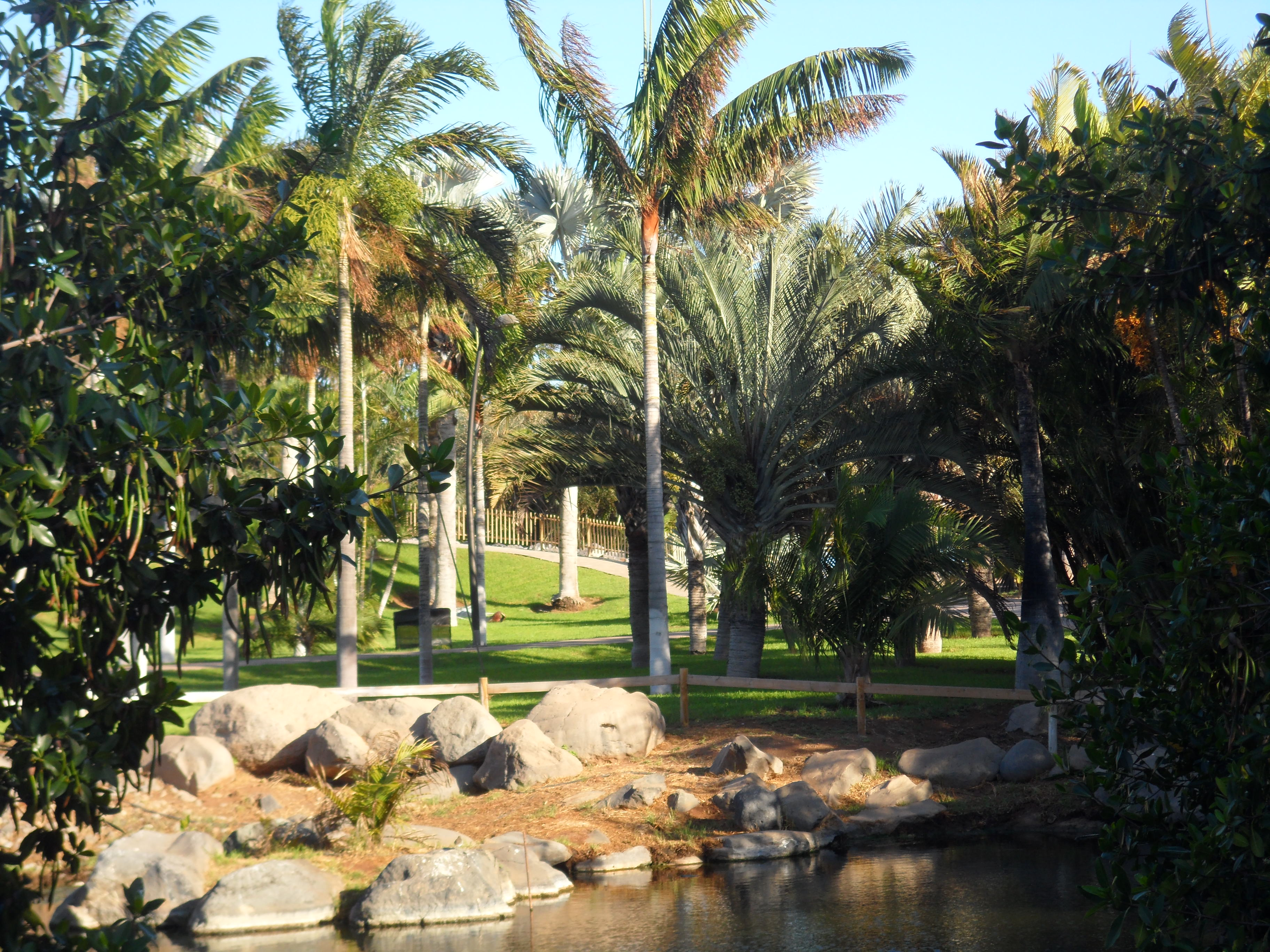
Dypsis leptocheilos

The surface of the hill is divided into biogeographical sections to represent the palm flora of different regions of the world. These sections vary in size from 1,000 to 20,000 m^{2} (0.25–5 acres). Some areas are landscaped with hills, streams, ponds, and waterfalls. The main sections and notable species are listed below.

- Thermophilous scrub of the Canary Islands (Anaga): Located on the north-facing slope of the hill, this section features flora native to the nearby Macizo de Anaga mountain range. It includes various endemic and native species, with abundant Canary Island date palms.
- Madagascar: This large section includes a pond with mangroves and Typhonodorum lindleyanum. A prominent group of Bismarckia nobilis dominates the area. Other notable palms include Ravenea xerophila, Tahina spectabilis, and several species of Ravenea, Beccariophoenix, and Dypsis. An Adansonia za (baobab), sown in 1996, grows near the lake, along with other endemic trees such as Delonix species.
- Caribbean Islands: The largest section of the Palmetum, it includes the main square surrounded by royal palms and features a large waterfall built from local rock, cascading into a pond bordered by white sand and coconut palms. It contains one of the world's most extensive collections of Caribbean palms, particularly of the genus Coccothrinax. Two species of Hemithrinax—Hemithrinax ekmaniana and Hemithrinax compacta—also thrive here.
- South America: This section follows a stream bordered by various species of Attalea and Syagrus. It includes significant South American palms such as Bactris gasipaes (peach palm) and Euterpe oleracea (açaí palm).
- Central America: A small area near the lake featuring large specimens of Sabal mauritiiformis and Swietenia macrophylla.
- New Caledonia: Overlooking the ocean, this section includes a grove of approximately 50 Araucaria columnaris planted in 2001. It also features Chambeyronia macrocarpa (red leaf palm) and a range of palms and trees endemic to New Caledonia, including Pandanus species and native conifers. A small area is dedicated to food crops from the Pacific islands.
- Melanesia: A compact section featuring palms native to Fiji and Vanuatu, such as Carpoxylon, Veitchia vitiensis, and Pritchardia pacifica. Other notable species include Metroxylon vitiense and Pelagodoxa henryana, growing near Morinda citrifolia (noni) and other tropical trees and shrubs.
- Hawaii: Home to several species of the endemic Hawaiian palm genus Pritchardia, along with other native species such as Acacia koa, Erythrina sandwicensis, Gossypium tomentosum (Hawaiian cotton), and various Hawaiian hibiscus.
- Australia: This section includes most Australian palm genera, featuring two large Corypha utan—the tallest palms in the Palmetum.

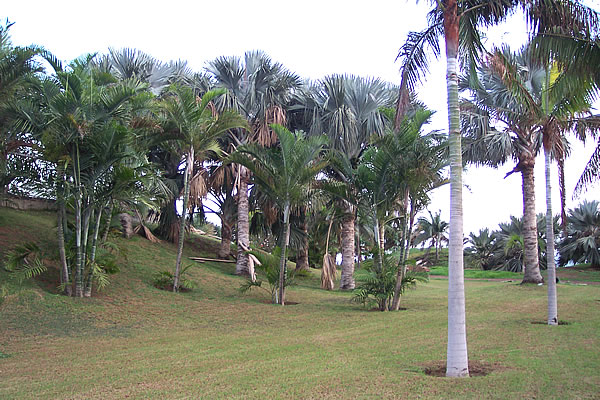
Madagascar section of the Palmetum

- Asia: This area features a large Ficus religiosa, a coastal path lined with coconut palms, and Corypha umbraculifera with their large leaves. Several Asian palm genera are represented, along with a collection of uncommon banana species.
- Africa: This section includes numerous Elaeis guineensis (oil palms) and other notable African genera such as Raphia australis, Borassus aethiopum, Hyphaene thebaica, and Medemia argun.
- Mascarene Islands: A smaller area with mature specimens of Acanthophoenix, Hyophorbe, Latania, and Dictyosperma.
- New Guinea, Borneo, and the Philippines: These biogeographical sections were established between 2007 and 2008 and remain closed to the public.
