= Isabela de Sagua =

Isabela de Sagua Isabela
- Village
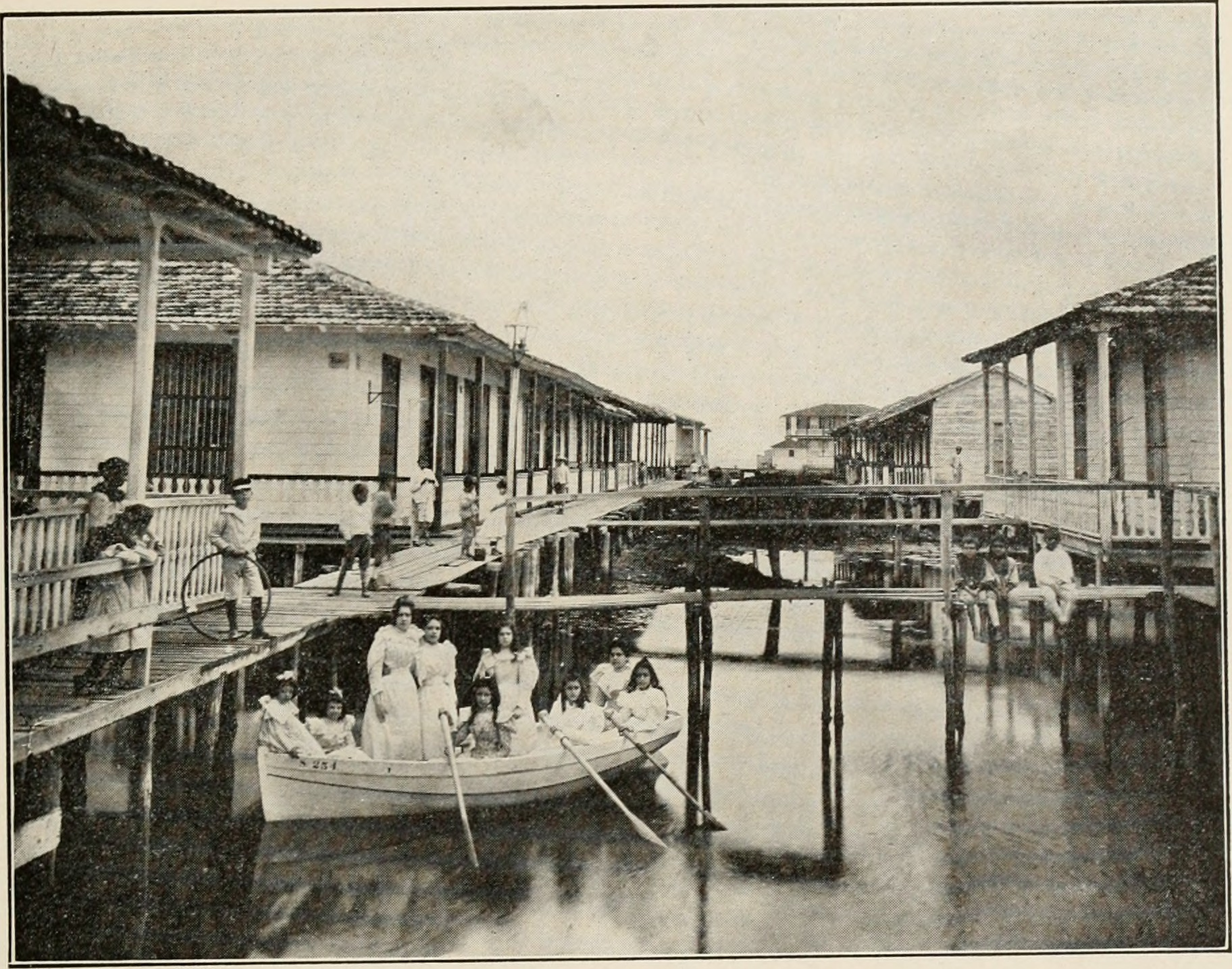
- Houses of Isabela in early 20th century
- Nickname: La Venecia de Cuba
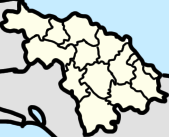
- Location of Isabela de Sagua in Cuba Isabela de Sagua (Villa Clara Province)
- Coordinates: 22°56′21.5″N 80°00′45.4″W
- Country: Cuba
- Province: Villa Clara
- Municipality: Sagua la Grande
- Founded: 1843
- Elevation: 5 m (16 ft)

Population (2011)
  - Total: 3,187
- Time zone: UTC-5 (EST)
- Area code: +53-422

Isabela de Sagua, also shortened as Isabela and nicknamed La Venecia de Cuba ("The Cuban Venice"), is a Cuban village and consejo popular ("people's council", i.e. hamlet) of the municipality of Sagua la Grande, in Villa Clara Province. In 2011 it had a population of 3,187.

== History ==
The village was founded in 1843 as the port and customs of Sagua and, 5 years later, it was enabled for international import trade. Hurricane Kate (1985) severely damaged the village, which was never rebuilt. Instead a new town called Nueva Isabela was created 2 miles away from Sagua La Grande and many Isabela residents moved there.

Among its most notable sons are Domingo Sánchez, Lázaro Sánchez, Juan Antonio Sánchez, and Lucio Benítez, all of whom spent years imprisoned for their opposition to the communist and totalitarian regime of Fidel and Raúl Castro Ruz. Have also produced baseball player of top quality such as Antonio Aleman and many others

The town has also produced painters, inventor & artists Reemby J. Parada Jr., amongst others, along with many others who have contributed significantly to its cultural and artistic development, making of Isabela de Sagua a leading cultural source for the area.

On 17 March 1963 Alpha 66, in coordination with the Second National Front of the Escambray, attacked the Soviet freighter the Lvov while it was anchored at Isabela de Sagua harbor. The ship was successfully hit with a canon and then strafed with machine guns. The USSR made a formal diplomatic complaint to the U.S. Embassy in protest and on 3 April the Russian ambassador Andrei Gromyko met with US ambassador Foy D. Kohler to complain. This raid and others by Cuban exiles was condemned by the Kennedy administration, considering it provocative and pointless.

== Geography ==
Located on a peninsula, west of Sagua la Grande River mouth and by a lagoon, Isabela lies by the Atlantic Coast, in front of the Jardines del Rey archipelago. It is surrounded by a marsh, that spans around the peninsula.

It is 11 km from Nueva Isabela, 17 from Sagua, 27 from the Mogotes de Jumagua, 36 from Cifuentes and 66 from Santa Clara.

== Transport ==
Isabela de Sagua has a port on the northwestern shore and a marina in the southwestern one. Its railway station is the northern terminus of the Santa Clara-Sagua-Isabela line and has some tracks serving the port. A provincial road links the village to Sagua la Grande and to the "Circuito Norte" (CN) highway.

== See also ==
- Municipalities of Cuba
- List of cities in Cuba
