= Wingate School =

Wingate School may refer to:

- A former name of Wingate University in the United States
- Wingate School (Spain)
- The Wingate School (Mexico)
