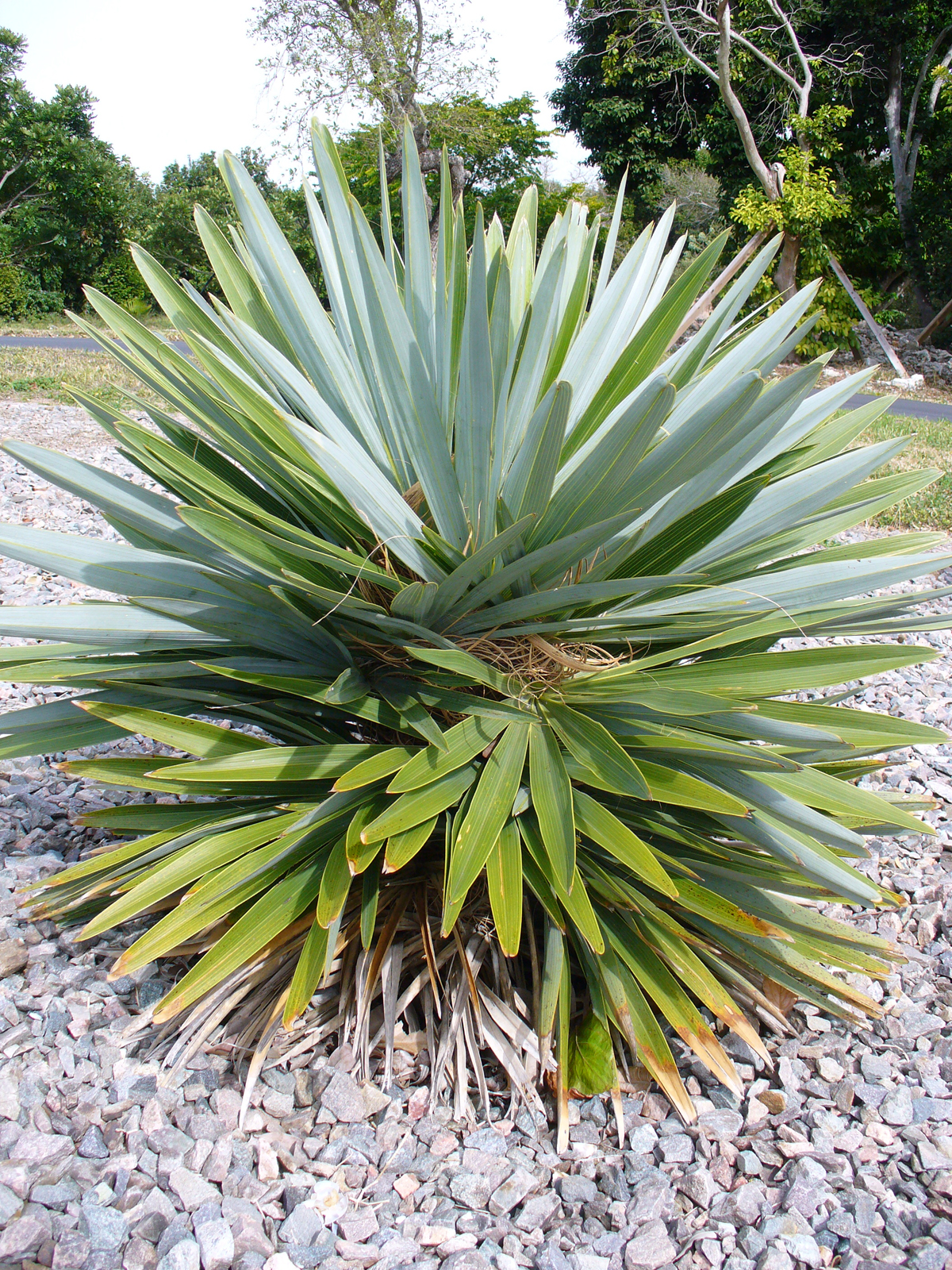

Conservation status
- Critically Endangered (IUCN 2.3)

Scientific classification
- Kingdom: Plantae
- Clade: Tracheophytes
- Clade: Angiosperms
- Clade: Monocots
- Clade: Commelinids
- Order: Arecales
- Family: Arecaceae
- Genus: Hemithrinax
- Species: H. ekmaniana

Binomial name
- Hemithrinax ekmaniana Burret

Synonyms
- Thrinax ekmaniana (Burret) Borhidi & O.Muñiz

= Hemithrinax ekmaniana =

Species of palm

Hemithrinax ekmaniana is a palm which is endemic to Cuba. Only a single population of less than 100 mature individuals remains in the wild.

== Distribution and habitat ==
It is an endemic palm of Mogotes de Jumagua in northern Cuba. This palm survives only on three of the small mogotes where it was rediscovered in 1978 by a group of paleontologists and naturalists looking for fossils in the caverns and cataloging the fauna and flora of the small mountains (Sabaneque Speleological Group). A small number under 100 individuals cling to the steep cliffs.

== Description ==
The Jumagua palm has a gray trunk about 5 cm in diameter holding a spherical and very dense crown of stiff, spiky light green leaves that have almost no stalks and therefore sit very close together.

== In horticulture ==
A seed collection picked in 1996 by specialists of Palmetum of Santa Cruz de Tenerife resulted in various plants now growing in a handful of Botanical Gardens; specimens can be found growing at the Montgomery Botanical Center in Miami, Palmetum de Santa Cruz in the Canary Islands, Orto botanico di Messina in Italy and The Jardín Botánico de Las Tunas, in Cuba. Until 2007 no commercial distribution of this plant was ever made, as in 2007 for the first time, seeds collected in the wild entered in the commercial seed trade and reached many growers in various areas of the world.
