= Palmetum =

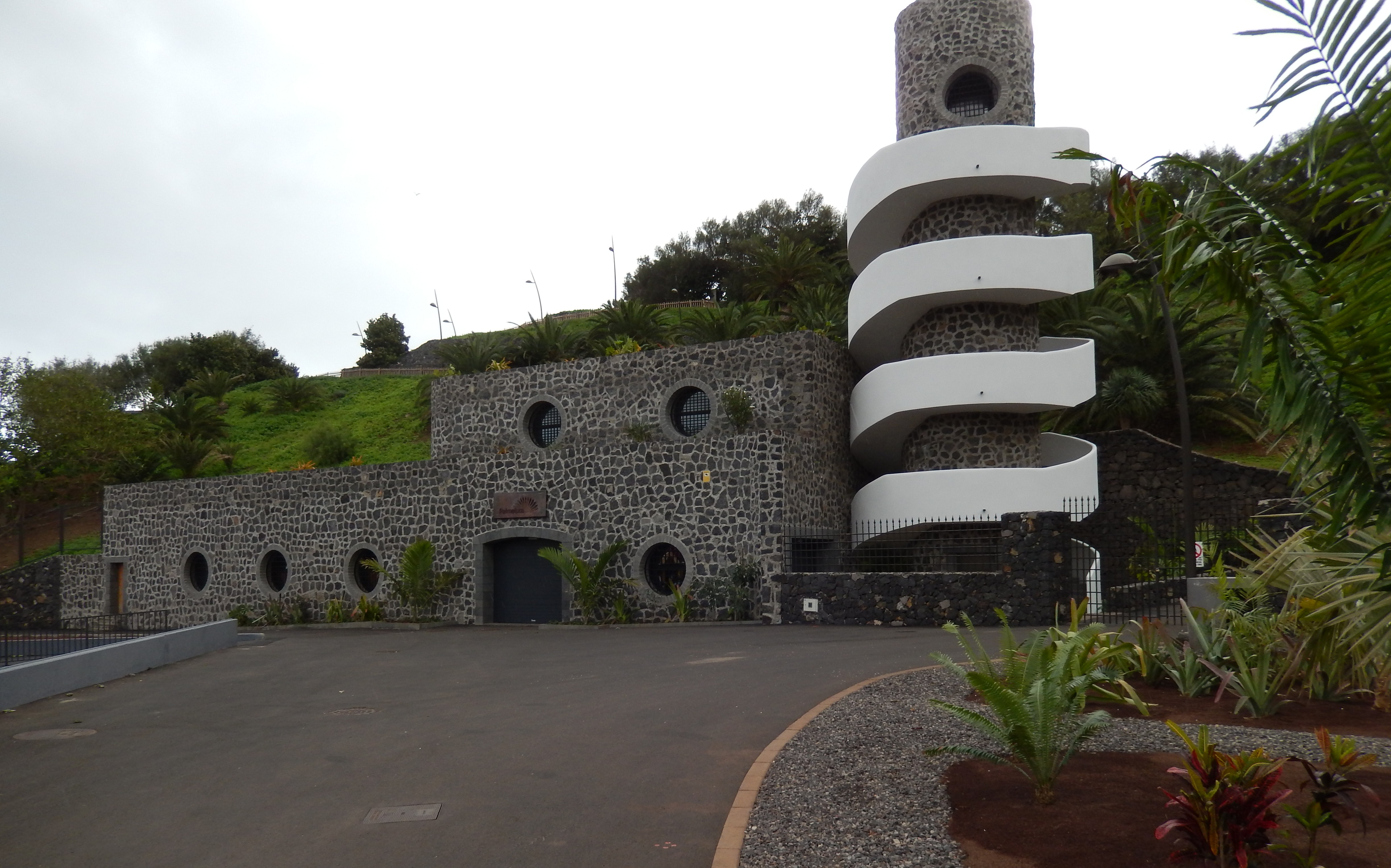
Entrance of Palmetum de Santa Cruz de Tenerife

A palmetum is a collection of cultivated palms (Arecaceae) in the context of a botanical garden or arboretum. Palmetums are used for the research, conservation, and public display of the members of the palm family.

== History ==
The transplanting and conservation of palms has occurred since at least the 19th century for species which provide important natural resources (e.g., Corypha umbraculifera). Europeans of the mid 19th century were particularly fascinated by palms, leading to the establishment of one of the first palm collections at the Royal Botanic Gardens, Kew.

Other early palmetums include Botanical Garden of Buitenzorg (Botanical Garden of Java) and Royal Botanic Gardens of Peradeniya (Sri Lanka).

== Places ==
Notable palmetums with large collections include:

- Royal Botanic Gardens, Kew - United Kingdom
- Meise Botanic Garden - Belgium
- Palmengarten der Stadt Frankfurt - Germany
- Caracas Botanical Garden - Venezuela
- Jardín Botánico Francisco Javier Clavijero - Mexico
- Palmetum of Santa Cruz de Tenerife - Canary Islands
- Montgomery Botanical Center - Florida, United States
- Fairchild Tropical Botanic Garden - Florida, United States
- Lyon Arboretum - Hawaii, United States
- Lakeside Palmetum - California, United States
- Townsville Palmetum - Australia
