= Morici =

Morici is a surname. Notable people with the surname include:

- Carlo Morici (born 1974), Italian botanist
- Peter Morici (born 1948), American economist
