= Arona, Tenerife =

Arona
- Municipality
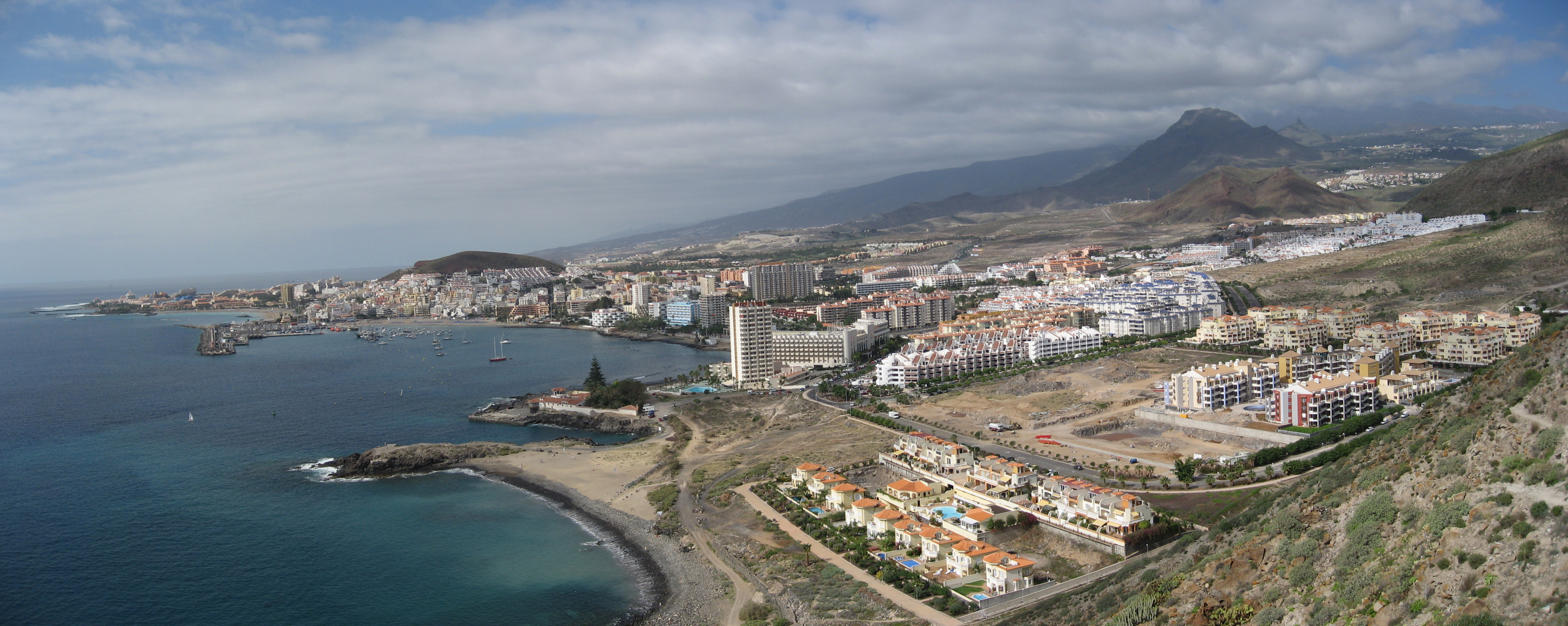
- Los Cristianos

- Flag Coat of arms

- Municipal location in Tenerife

- Location in Tenerife Arona (Canary Islands) Arona (Spain, Canary Islands)
- Coordinates: 28°6′N 16°40′W
- Country: Spain
- Autonomous Region: Canary Islands
- Province: Santa Cruz de Tenerife
- Island: Tenerife

Government
  - Mayor: José Julián Mena Pérez (PSOE)

Area
  - Total: 31.58 sq mi (81.79 km^{2})

Population (2025-01-01)
  - Total: 87,793
  - Density: 2,780/sq mi (1,073/km^{2})
- Time zone: UTC+0 (WET)
  - Summer (DST): UTC+1 (WEST)
- Post Code: 38640
- Climate: Csb
- Website: www.arona.org

Arona is a municipality in the southern part of the island of Tenerife in the Canary Islands, Spanish region and archipelago in the Atlantic Ocean, in Macaronesia. The municipality covers an area of 81.79 square kilometres comprising 4% of the island's area. The town of Arona is 59 km southwest of Santa Cruz de Tenerife, the island's capital. The population in 2025 was 87,793. It is the third largest city in Tenerife, after, Santa Cruz de Tenerife and San Cristóbal de La Laguna. Arona has a pleasant climate with temperatures ranging from 20 to 25 degrees Celsius. Notable places include the tourist resorts of Los Cristianos, Playa de las Americas, Costa del Silencio and Las Galletas. Arona also features Punta Salemas, the southernmost point of the island of Tenerife. The TF-1 motorway passes through the municipality.

== History ==
The area was sparsely populated in the initial centuries since the settlement of the island. While Viera y Clavijo mentioned a small village of the same name in an early work on the islands, a church was not built until the 17th century and this church did not obtain the status of a parish church until March 1796.

The economy until the twentieth century was based on fishing and agriculture including cochineal, bananas and cattle. There was also a small quarry in the fishing village of Los Cristianos in the nineteenth century.

In the first half of the twentieth century, the population grew slowly despite a slump in cochineal prices, a general decline in farming and the Spanish Civil War. However, the economy and population has grown rapidly in recent years as it has become a popular tourist destination. The population has grown from 13,556 in 1981 to 28,208 in 1996. The 2005 population has finally reached over 60,000. In contrast, the municipality had a population of approximately 2,000 in 1901. The tourism industry employs 60% of the workforce.

Since 2015, the town of Los Cristianos in Arona is the headquarters of the Islamic Federation of the Canary Islands, which is the organization that brings together associations and Muslim communities of the Canary Islands.

== Education ==
Wingate School, a British international school, is in Arona.

Svenska Skolan Teneriffa, the Swedish school on Tenerife, is in Arona.

== Notable areas ==
The Central Park of Arona (Spanish: Parque Central de Arona), finished in 2004 is a city park of four hectares. Designed by architects and biologists, it hosts a collection of tropical palms, and a rocky section with the original endemic flora native to this part of the island.

Los Cristianos is one of the main tourist centres on the south coast of Tenerife. Originally a quaint fishing village the resort has undergone some major expansion over the last 20 years and is now a bustling resort.

Las Galletas is a fishing village situated between Los Cristianos and the Tenerife South Airport in the south. It also has some tourist facilities. It has also become a tourist resort. The beach on Playas de Las Vistas has been refurbished with sand from the sea bed turning it into one of the longest beaches in Tenerife.

Historical population

Year	Pop.	±%
1900	1,971	—
1930	3,482	+76.7%
1950	4,690	+34.7%
1970	10,942	+133.3%
1981	13,556	+23.9%
1986	17,739	+30.9%
1991	22,721	+28.1%

Year	Pop.	±%
1996	28,208	+24.1%
2001	43,259	+53.4%
2002	52,572	+21.5%
2003	57,445	+9.3%
2004	59,935	+4.3%
2013	80,987	+35.1%
2017	93,496	+15.4%

== Notable people ==
- Bruno González (born 1990), football player

== See also ==
- Hospital del Sur de Tenerife
