= Playa de las Américas =

Holiday resort in Arona, Tenerife

Coordinates: 28°04′03″N 16°43′57″W

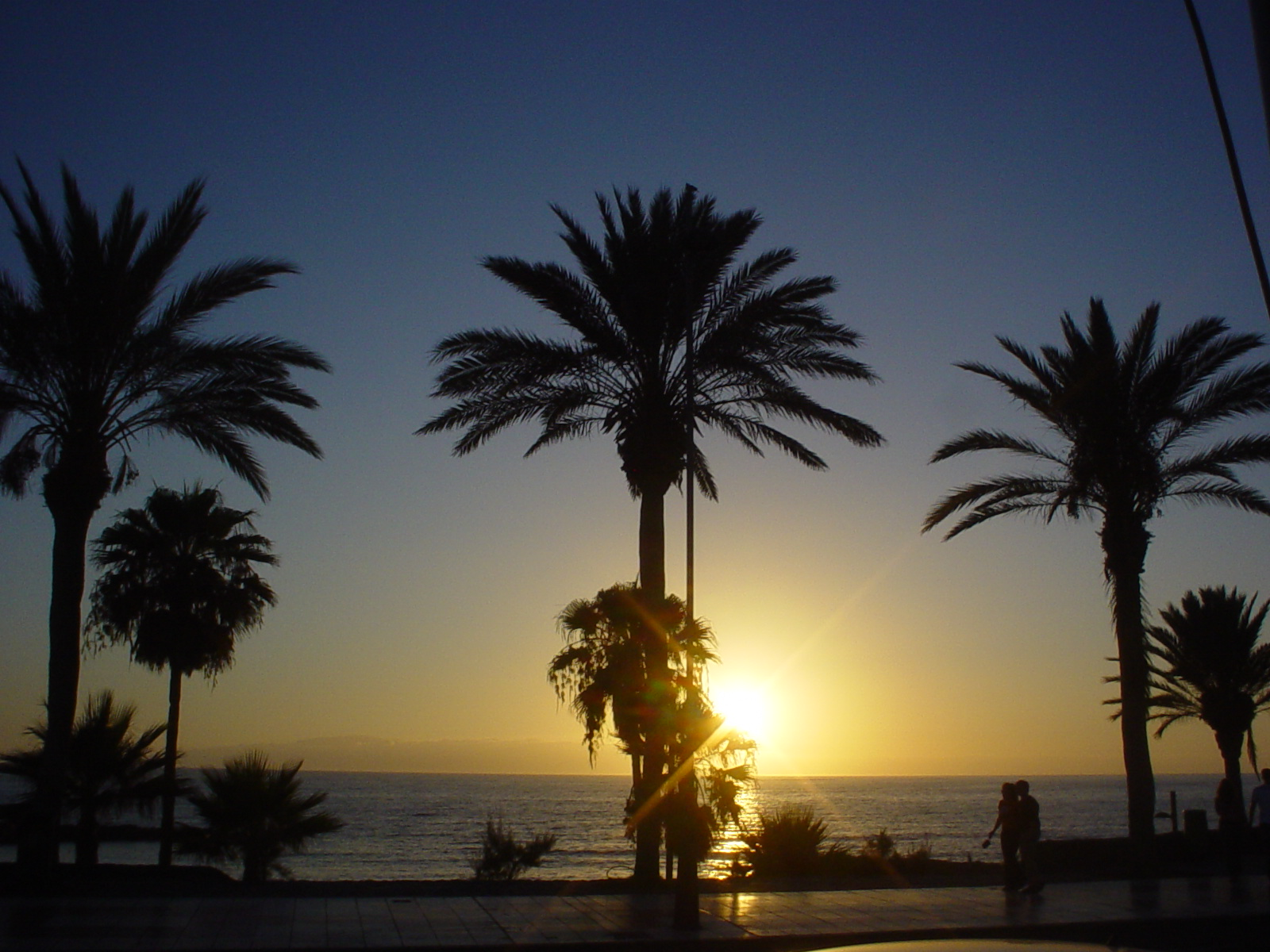
Sunset in Playa De Las Americas

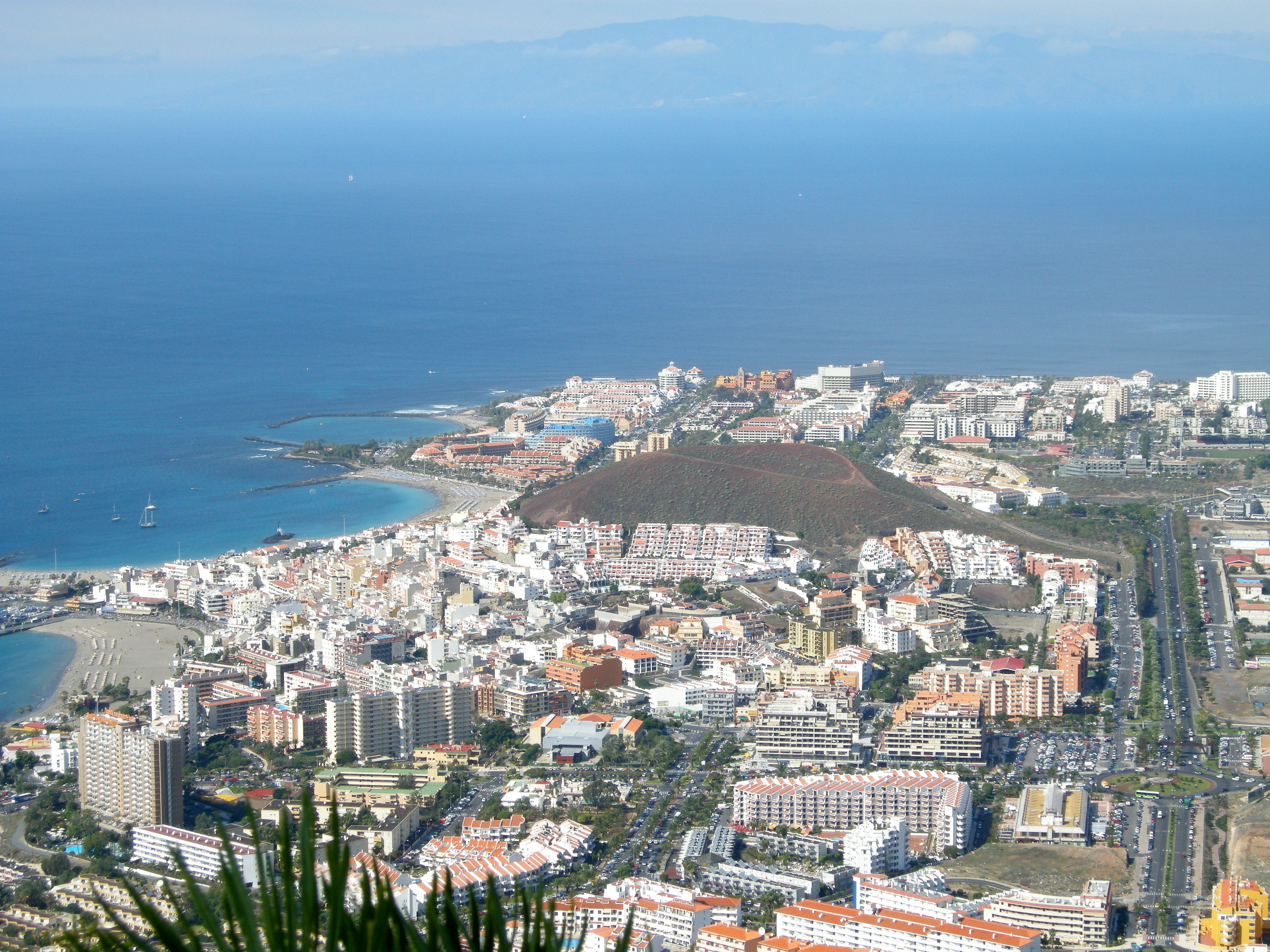
Los Cristianos and Las Americas - view from Montaña de Guaza

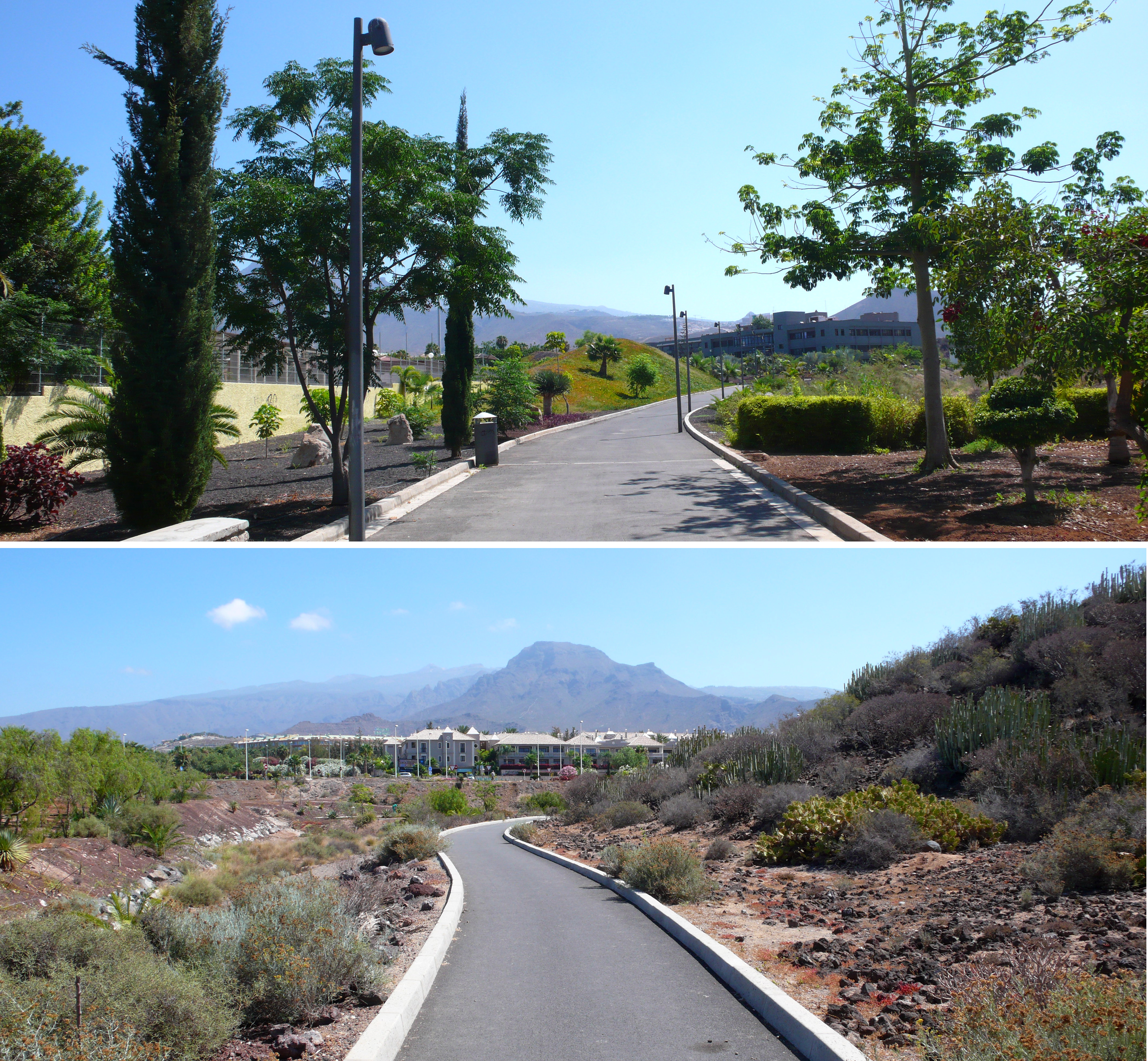
Parque Central de Arona

Playa de las Américas is a purpose-built holiday resort in Tenerife, one of the Canary Islands of Spain. It is located in the southern and southern-west part of the Municipality of Arona, close to the adjoining Municipality of Adeje in the west of Tenerife. It was built in the 1960s a few miles distant from the fishing village of Los Cristianos. Playa de las Americas now (2021) is part of the contiguous touristic construction zone lining Tenerife's entire southwestern coast. The resort area features bars, nightclubs, restaurants, attractions, and beaches, most of which are man-made with imported sand from Africa due to the darkness of the native volcanic sand. Playa de las Americas is a centre of nightlife in Tenerife. Nightlife is spread around the resort and includes the Veronicas Strip, Starco Commercial Centre and the Patch.

== Places of interest ==
=== Beaches ===
There are five main beaches.

==== Playa de El Bobo ====
This beach is found at the foot of H10 Gran Tinerfe hotel. This is the northernmost beach of Playa de las Américas.

==== Playa de Troya ====
Protected by breakwaters, Playa de Troya beach allows for fun in the water without high waves. This beach is located near Ravine of Troy (Spanish: Barranco de Troya).

==== Playa del Camisón ====
Playa del Camisón is the southernmost beach of Playa de las Américas.

==== Playa de las Vistas ====
A family friendly and accessible beach. With gold sand.

== Central Park of Arona ==
The Central Park of Arona, or Parque Central de Arona, is a public park of 42,000 square metres. It has several squares, playgrounds and parking areas and a collection of tropical and Canarian plants.

It is located in the centre of Playa de las Americas beside the football stadium. It is bordered by colleges, court, a hospital, and residential buildings.

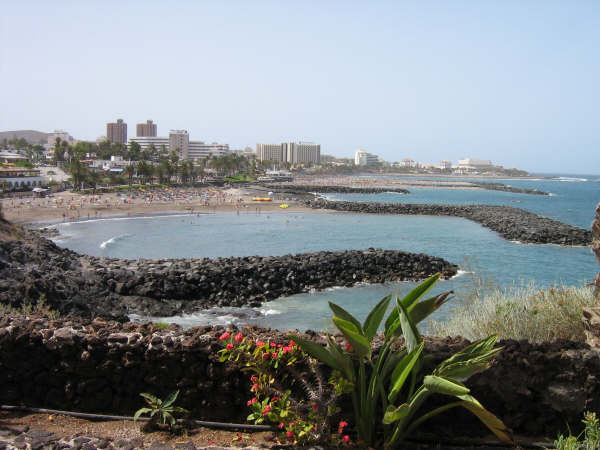
Beaches of Playa de Las Americas
