= Elizabeth Pérez =

Venezuelan television presenter (born 1976)

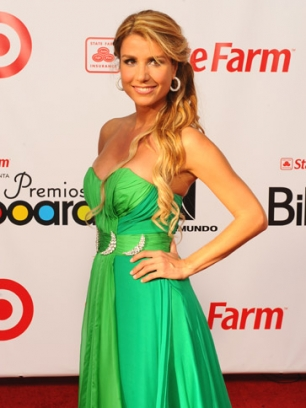
- Pérez at the 2009 Billboard Latin Music Awards in Miami
- Born: Elizabeth Pérez; June 16, 1976 (age 49); Sagua La Grande, Cuba
- Education: Universidad Bicentenaria de Aragua
- Occupation: Television journalist
- Years active: 2003–present
- Awards: Emmy Award

Elizabeth Pérez ( June 16, 1976) is a Cuban-Venezuelan-American television journalist and presenter working for CNN en Español in Miami, Florida.

== Early life ==
Elizabeth Pérez moved from Cuba to Venezuela with her parents at an early age. She was born in Sagua La Grande, Las Villas, Cuba but grew up in Maracay, Aragua State. She attended the Universidad Bicentenaria de Aragua and graduated as a Systems Engineer. In 2000, Pérez moved to the United States to study at Boston University. She was awarded a scholarship granted by the Puerto Rican Newspaper "El Nuevo Día" and enrolled at Florida International University. While at FIU, Pérez interned with El Nuevo Herald where she wrote and published several articles on different topics. Pérez also interned with Telemundo, where she produced and anchored an entertainment segment for Telemundo Internacional. Before graduating from FIU, Pérez began working for Telemundo as an entertainment anchor for several of the station's shows. She holds a master's degree in Mass Communications from Florida International University.

== Career ==
Pérez is currently a Sports anchor and correspondent for CNN en Español covering the latest and most relevant news in the world of sports throughout the daytime programming.

Pérez joined CNN after working as a TV presenter for the sports segments on Telemundo News, based in Miami, where she was also invited as a guest reporter on the extreme sport show, Ritmo Deportivo.

She started her television career as an Entertainment Reporter for the Telemundo Internacional Weekend Newscast broadcast in Latinoamerica and parts of Europe.

In 2004, Pérez became the Co-Host and Entertainment Anchor for "Quiéreme Descalzi", a news magazine in América Teve.

In 2006 Pérez hosted Galavision 2-hour special "Rumbo a Premios Juventud".

Pérez has hosted other shows on Telemundo including Reventon Billboards 2009 and Calle 8. In 2008 and 2009 she reported live from the Red Carpet of Premios Billboard a la Música Latina for Telemundo 51 Newscast.

Pérez has covered significant sporting events such as NASCAR in Indianapolis, Indy300 in the Homestead Speedway, the Red Bull SoapBox race in St. Louis, The Air and Boat show in Fort Lauderdale, and the Smash Super Bowl party for the NFL. She has also interviewed relevant figures in the world of sports, music and arts such as Oscar de la Renta, Udonis Haslem, Shaquille O’Neal, Carl Lewis, Dwayne "The Rock" Johnson, Emerson Fittipaldi, Miguel Cabrera, Ramon Dominguez, Shakira, David Bisbal, Daddy Yankee, Chayanne, Juanes, América Ferrera, and Enrique Iglesias, among others.

In 2011, Cynthia Hudson, senior vice president and general manager of CNN en Español and Hispanic strategy for CNN/U.S. welcomed Pérez saying: “Our viewers are assiduous sports fans, and we are pleased to bring, throughout the day, everything they want to know about this fascinating world with the hiring of a dynamic journalist such as Elizabeth.”

In 2011 Pérez anchored special shows for CNN en Español related to Sports: Herencia Hispana, Playoffs and Trás el Oro. That same year, she covered the Copa Libertadores and Copa América for CNN en Español and CNN International. Pérez reported live from Atlanta a weekly segment called Copa Chat for World Sport, the CNN International show broadcast from London and anchored by Don Riddell. She also served as a correspondent covering the 2011 Pan American Games in Guadalajara, Mexico.

== Awards ==
In 2008, Pérez received the Emmy Award for Best On-Camera News Talent, for her work at Telemundo News. In 2009, she was nominated in the same category. Throughout her career, she has been recognized with three Emmy Awards, the highest honor bestowed by the National Academy of Television Arts and Sciences in the United States, for her journalistic work.

== Charity work ==
Perez has been a Big Sister with Big Brothers Big Sisters of America since 2007 and collaborates with Food for the Poor, following a humanitarian mission to Guatemala in 2023. She is the face of the American Foundation's Latin American and Caribbean Children's Aid Program campaign. She is also an animal rights advocate.
