= Central Park of Arona =

Park in Tenerife, Spain

Coordinates: 28°03′29″N 16°43′34″W

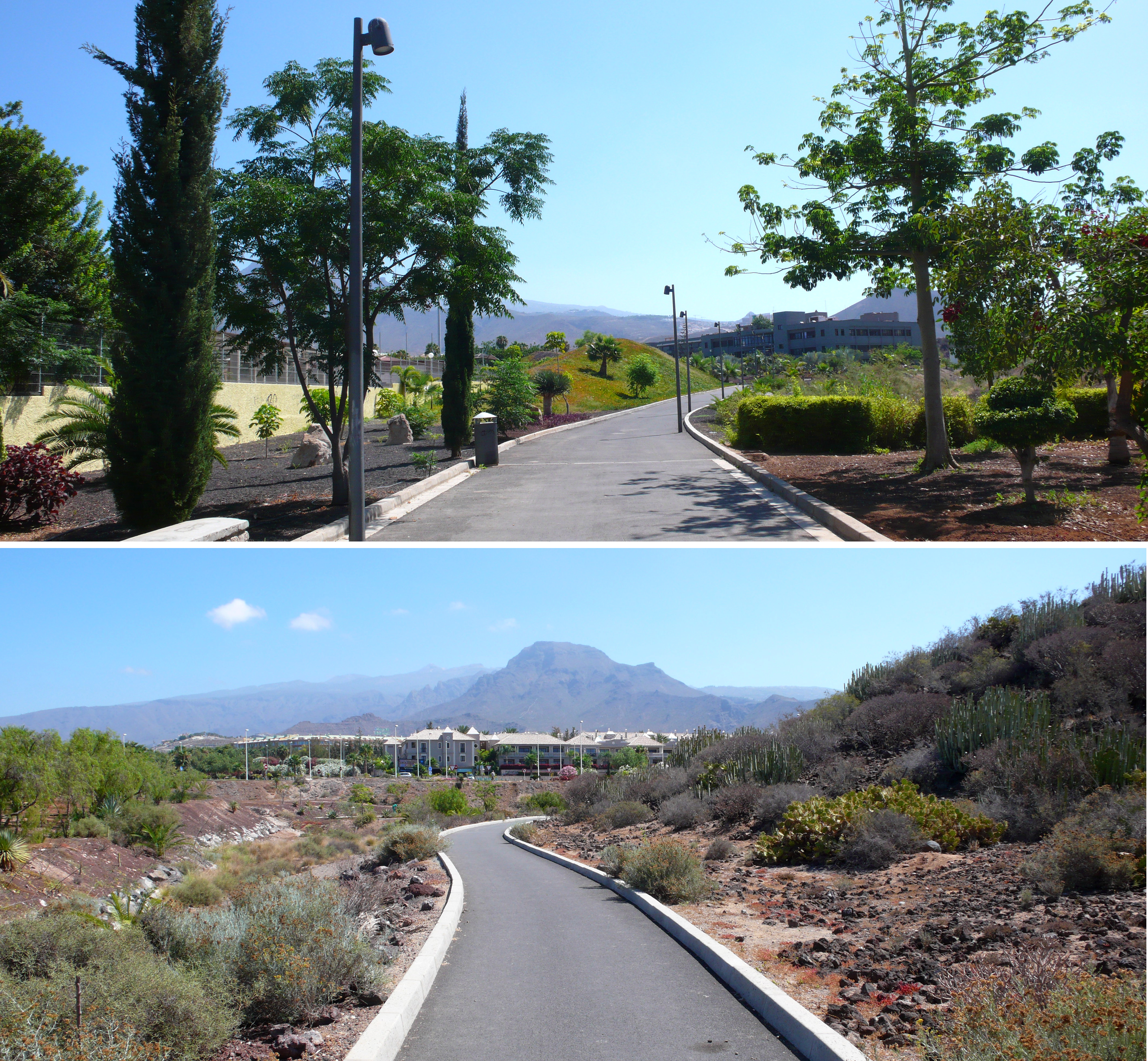
Two different views of the Central Park of Arona

The Parque Central de Arona is a public park of 42,000 square metres in Arona, Tenerife, in the Canary Islands. It is made up of several squares and gardens in the tourist centre of Playa de las Americas.

The park, which opened in 2004, was commissioned by the Cabildo de Tenerife and designed by GBGV Architects (Architect Jorge Mosquera Paniagua) and the botanist Carlo Morici. The park displays the native flora of the Canary Islands.

Walkways are lined with tamarind and macadamia trees. A third of the area is covered with over 40 species of palm trees intermingled with tropical vegetation. The family Bombaceae is well represented by Chorisia speciosa, Bombax ceiba, Ceiba pentandra, and several baobabs, including Adansonia digitata and A. grandidieri.

Morici designed an environmental reconstruction of the endangered Canarian coastal scrub, typically characterized by Euphorbia balsamifera and Euphorbia canariensis.

Other trees include the official tree of Arona, Pistacia atlantica, dragon trees, and the Canary Island date palm (Phoenix canariensis).
