= Sagua La Grande =

Sagua la Grande
- Municipality
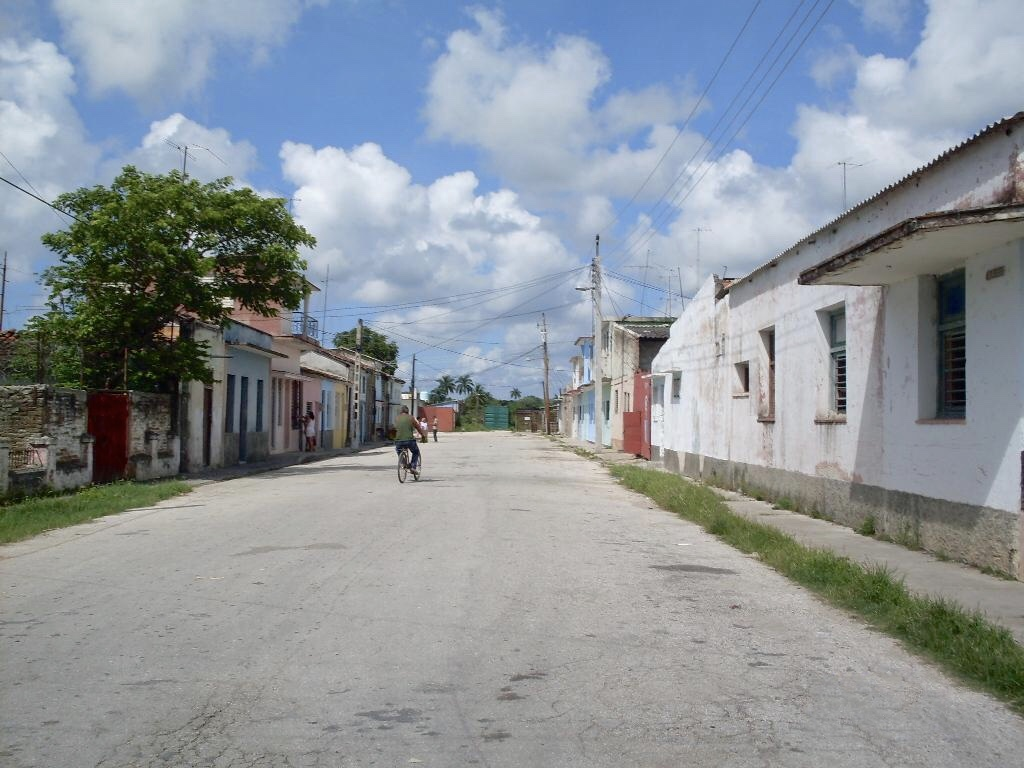
- View of a central town's road

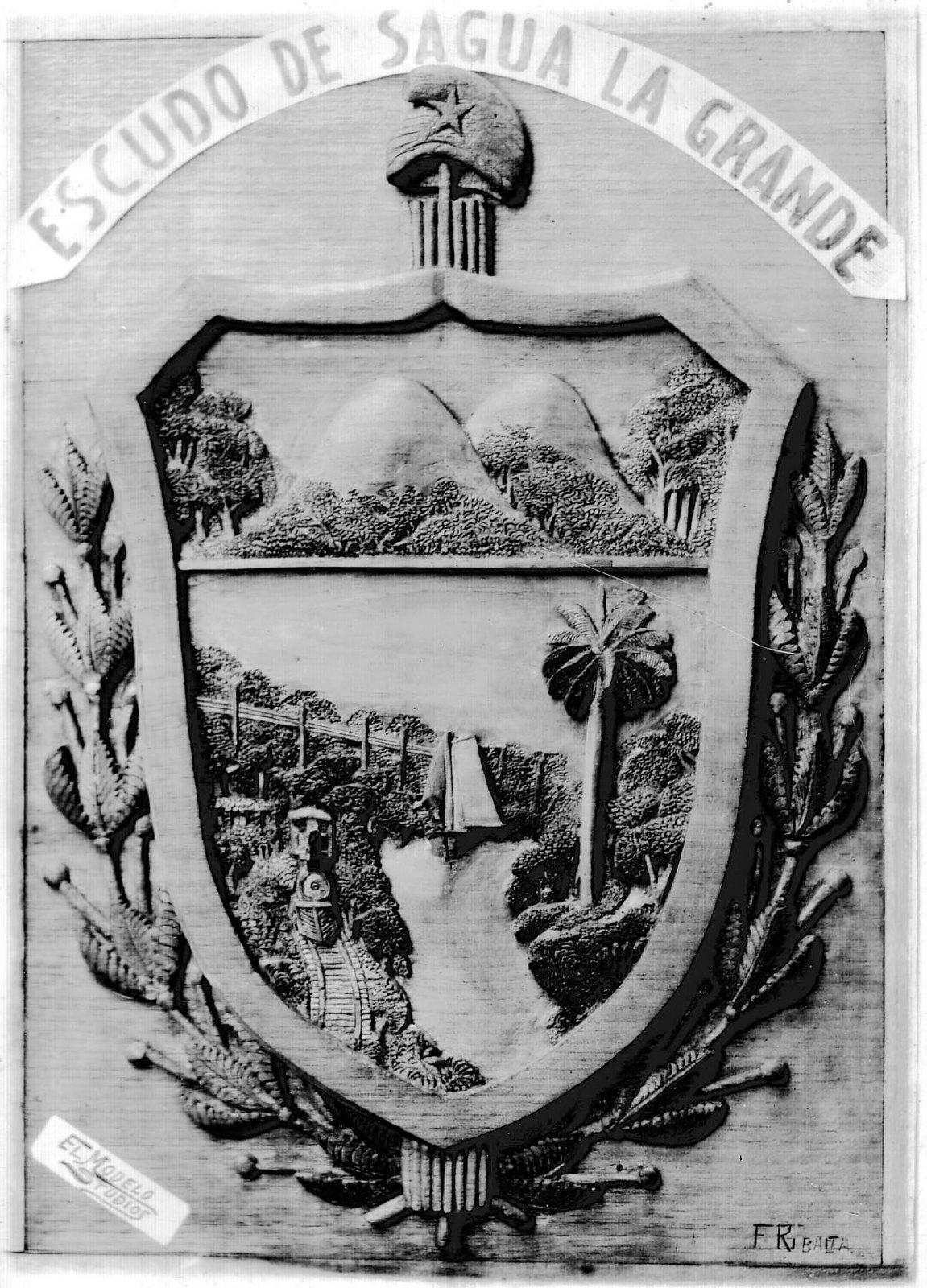
- Coat of arms
- Nickname: La Villa del Undoso
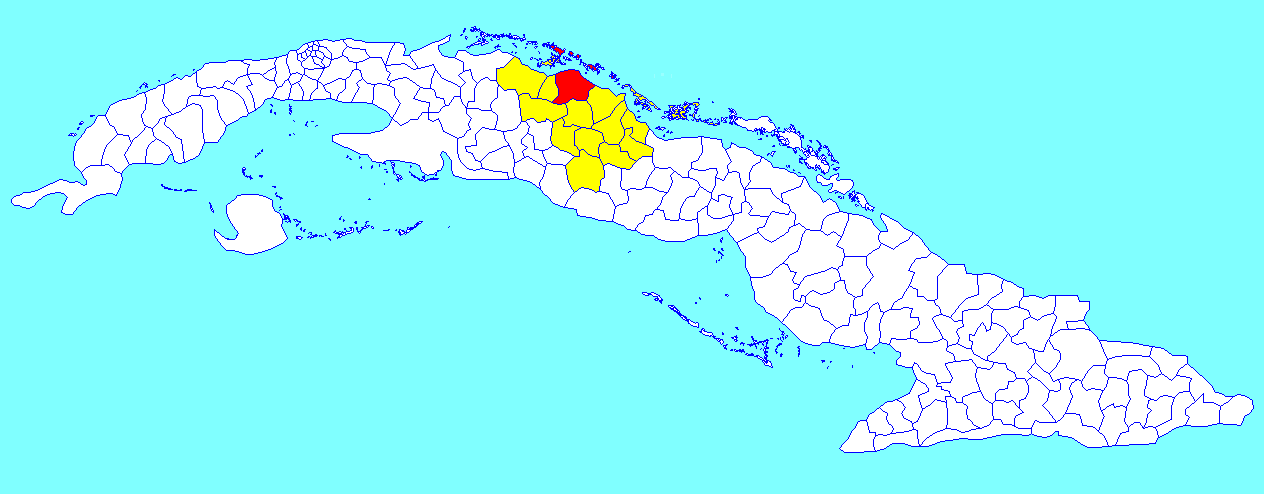
- Sagua la Grande municipality (red) within Villa Clara Province (yellow) and Cuba
- Coordinates: 22°48′31″N 80°04′16″W
- Country: Cuba
- Province: Villa Clara
- Founded: 1812
- Established: 1842 (Municipality)

Government
  - President: Liz María Wilson Reyes

Area
  - Municipality: 661 km^{2} (255 sq mi)
- Elevation: 15 m (49 ft)

Population (2022)
  - Municipality: 49,986
  - Density: 75.6/km^{2} (196/sq mi)
  - Urban: 42,984
- Time zone: UTC-5 (EST)
- Area code: +53-422

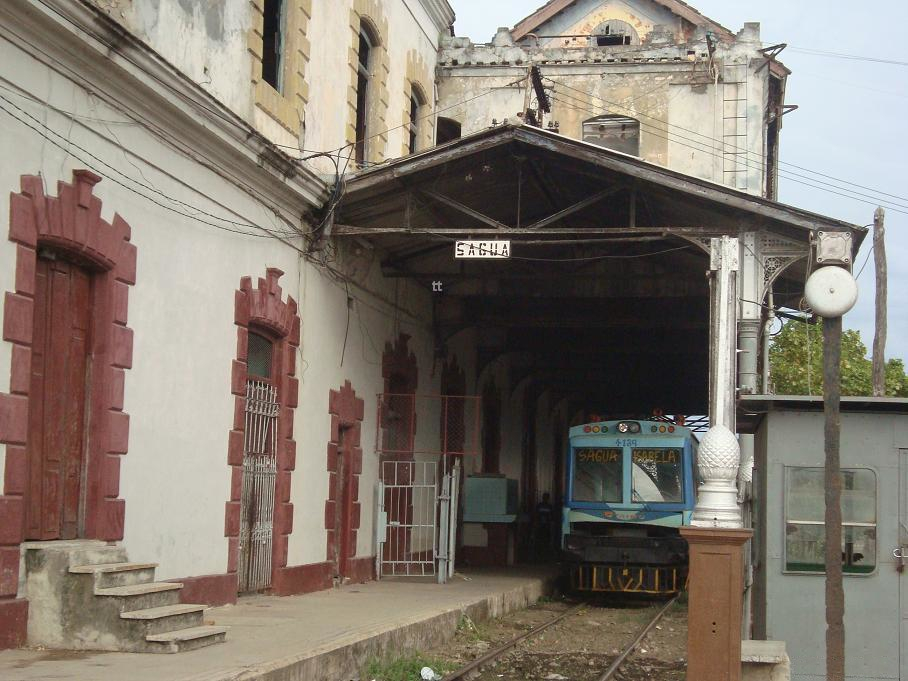
Sagua train station

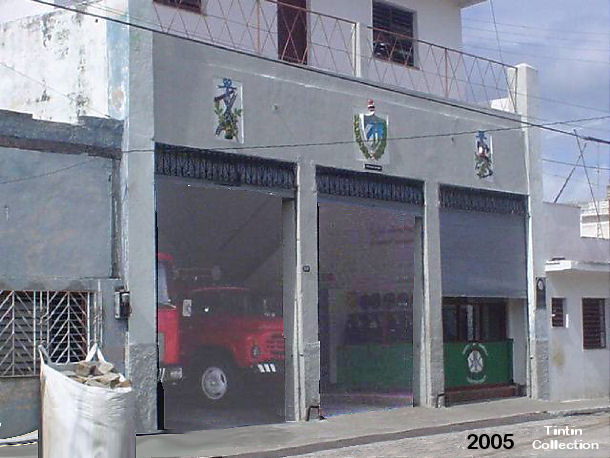
The fire station of Sagua

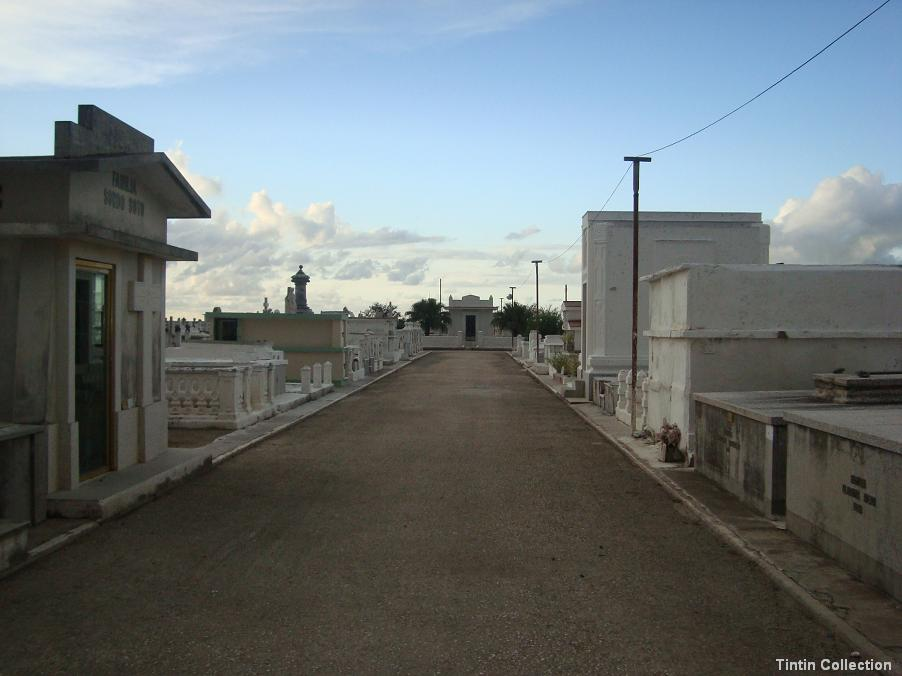
Sagua Cemetery

Sagua la Grande (nicknamed La Villa del Undoso, sometimes shortened in Sagua) is a municipality located on the north coast of the province of Villa Clara in central Cuba, on the Sagua la Grande River. The city is close to Mogotes de Jumagua, limestone cliffs. Many cays of the Sabana-Camaguey Archipelago are located off the northern coast. People born in Sagua are called "sagüeros".

== History ==
Sagua la Grande was founded in 1812 and established as a municipality in 1842. By the beginning of the 20th century, the city and its port (Isabela de Sagua), were an important commercial center. Presently, its economy is based on the sugar, chemical, mechanical, and food industries. Cattle raising and fishing are other important economic activities.

Two city historians are notable. Antonio Miguel Alcover Beltrán left to the inheritance of the events related to the 19th century thanks to his personal interrogations to each one of the authors of history; and at the moment Pedro Suárez Rojo (Tintín) has been in charge to rescue all 20th century and leaves from the 21st century in his famous “Tintin Collection” that includes newspapers, books, photos, films and videos of all the historical events of the referred time.

Until the 1977 municipal reform, it was divided into the barrios of Baire, Calabazar de Sagua (now part of Encrucijada), Chinchila, Este, General Nodarse, Isabela de Sagua, Jumagua, Malpáez, Oeste and Sitiecito.

== Geography ==
Located northwest of its province, close to the Atlantic Coast, Sagua borders with the municipalities of Quemado de Güines, Santo Domingo, Cifuentes and Encrucijada. It counts the villages of Isabela de Sagua, La Rosita, Nueva Isabela, Playa Uvero (or Uvero), Sitiecito and Viana. Isabela, located by the coast, is the largest village and a port town.

== Demographics ==
In 2022, the municipality of Sagua la Grande had a population of 49,986. With a total area of 661 km^{2} (255 sq mi), it has a population density of 84.9/km^{2} (220/sq mi).

== Architecture ==
The city's wide streets and little traffic give it a calm atmosphere.

In recent decades there has been a lack of new construction. Consequently, the older buildings, left over from colonial times, are in a state of decay. One of the most beautiful buildings in this city, El Casino Español (The Spanish Casino) built in 1908, was the meeting place for the Sociedad Sagüera (Social Club of Sagua).

Colonial times

The architectural and urban evolution of Sagua la Grande is the result of an economic development favoured by the natural conditions of its soil, its privileged geographical position with respect to trade and political and social events from its foundation to the present.

In this respect, in 1830, only 18 years after its foundation, it was already the economic center of a region with more than 26 sugar mills, which from the architectural point of view, favored the evolution of the typology of housing, with the insertion of residences of masonry, but still predominate, wood and tile, as well as mud and guano. In this period the first cemetery is built, the first administration of post office of the town, the first school is founded by José Cabrera, who was later proposed, member of the Real Sociedad Patriótica de la Habana, by José de la Luz y Caballero.

In 1841 there were already 1216 inhabitants in Sagua distributed in 253 houses, 4 high buildings of masonry, 113 of boards and tiles and 115 of busbar and guano. A year later the arms command appears. The buildings of this stage were characterized by their simplicity and sobriety, housing as a fundamental theme of the urban fabric, expresses in their facades the molded cornices, designed in a very varied way, giving it a very particular seal the coat that repeats itself in a very varied way. Beauty is removed to the interior in the central courtyards, hangings, colourful stained glass windows and spacious halls. The monumentality of some constructions does not manage, however, to hinder the harmonic image of the surroundings, this is the case of the house of Count More built during the 1870s whose owner was founder of the railway in the region and a prosperous merchant.

The first streets followed spontaneously, many of them going perpendicular to the river, which determined the anarchy of the initial urbanization, which after the layout of 1849, made by Rodrigo de Bernardo y Estrada, took neoclassical characteristics, interpreted in the width of the streets and the orthogonality of their blocks. These followed the sinuosities of the river, due to the fact that the village had been formed from the felling of wood, and later the tobacco agriculture, which depended on the proximity of the river, since it was a main export route.

In 1850 the Spanish soldier Joaquín Fernández Casariego was assigned to the post of Lieutenant Governor, who exempted Don Matías Lievana from the post. With Casariego in the jurisdiction, the decade of 1850 was transcendental in the development of Sagua, because the sewage system of the city was constructed, the first streets were paved, studies were consummated for the communication of the village with the rest of the country, the first director plan for the urban growth was carried out, and the hotels Ambos Mundos and Cuatro Naciones were erected, the construction of the public jail was finished and its square, in 1856 the railroad is founded, the first Bank arises in 1857, the first printing press was born, and with it the newspaper of the village. The coat of arms of La Ciudad de Sagua la Grande was created in 1863.

The Parish of La Libertad Park, built in 1860, is one of the most prominent neoclassical exponents in the region. For this period the city showed an accelerated growth, fostered by the development of regional industries, mainly sugar and its derivatives. The sugar mills had multiplied their annual production and made the trade of their product viable thanks to the arrival of the railroad. The public services had grown, occupying an area of almost 20% of the built land, electric lighting is achieved in the streets of the village, also incorporating a telephone network. With this situation it was granted the title of Villa and acquired, in 1843, its own jurisdictional party.

By 1890 the census showed that the territory had a population of 24640 inhabitants in the Sagüero Jurisdictional Party, with 13 633 inhabitants in the city, distributed between the North, South, Coco solo and San Juan or General Nodarse neighborhoods.

Republic

As a result of the development achieved by the city in the first quarter of the twentieth century, a series of important social works are carried out, defined by a picturesque character, and the richness in expression reached in the design, coming to find distributed throughout the city an assorted number of private dwellings with a marked architectural and artistic value. The decoration reached in elements such as grilles and dust guards characterizes the architecture in a very special way. In this stage works of great importance were erected, that in spite of the development reached in the technology, the wood continued in force in buildings like the Ladies Tennis Club and the Cinema Theater Enchantment; the first one was a multitudinous sports club of municipal scale, and the last one remained standing during almost 80 years constituting a milestone of great social value for the city. The historic center that today occupies 66 blocks with a total of 1 053 properties, 70% of them have architectural value. Three main styles stand out: eclecticism, neoclassicism and traditional architecture.

The domestic architecture in the first decades of the century, evolved within the eclectic style in its three variants such as: popular eclectic that developed from 1905 to 1914, the academic eclectic from 1915 to 1920 and the eclectic evolved from 1921 to 1933, predominantly single-level constructions accentuating the horizontality of the buildings and predominating the classic elements with a much greater decoration than in the colony.

In the twentieth century begins a period of economic boom in the town, characterized by the expansion of urban boundaries, beginning the construction of avenues (Oña, Backer, etc.). The Port of Isabela de Sagua is favored for being the closest of the country to the United States, facilitating the penetration of capital in the territory. In 1905 the bridge "El Triunfo" was built to replace the wooden bridge that joins Martí Street with Gómez Avenue (now 9 de Abril), the branch of the Royal Bank of Canada was opened and the school of Los Jesuitas was built.

The architectural wealth of the city is not limited to the Historical Center, because there are isolated groups or buildings of great value such as the Yaniz Clinic, eclectic style of the early twentieth century or the homes of the Reparto Oña, with marked influence of the neocalifornian style belonging to wealthy families from the 20 to 40, the former Spanish Colony built in the nineteenth century and remodeled in the early twentieth century, among others. The most remarkable thing when you look at the built environment is the volume of traditional wooden buildings that are spread throughout the Historic Urban Center, including the outskirts of it. It is uncommon to find the degree of design of these buildings, in other cases of the same type throughout the country.

The Modern Movement was invigorated in the City with the economic rise of the 1950s, manifesting itself within the historic center with some buildings of various levels, which are mixed with the rest within a compact plot. There are isolated examples of modern single-family dwellings from the pre-revolutionary period, most of which conform to the common plots and respect, in most cases, the existing façade line. However, the expression of modern buildings built on the outskirts of the city comes closer to the idea of habanero residential neighborhoods, where isolated buildings prevail, determined by the use of portals, gardens or terraces; the aqueduct was also built to the port of Sagüero on March 10, 1952 thanks to the efforts of the Representative to the House of Sagua Mr. Rafael del Busto Padín with President Mr. Carlos Prío Socarrás.

Revolution

With the Triumph of the Revolution on January 1, 1959, numerous social works such as schools, clinics, hospitals and polyclinics would be built, for which typical designs based on prefabricated systems would be used to this day. These works would be built far from the Historic Urban Center of the city, which is why it has been able to preserve, until today and despite the deterioration achieved, most of its built heritage prior to 1930.

Present

At present the city conserves the neoclassical and eclectic spirit of its urban planning and its architecture, with reduced modern incursions in its historic center that would guarantee it for the condition of National Monument granted on December 6, 2011.

Architectural icons

Among the most notable architectural and urbanistic values that reach our days, the railway terminal, the Catholic Church, La Villa de París, Palacio Arenas, the Grand Hotel Sagua, the Spanish Casino and the home of the Count of Casa Moré, among many others, stand out.

Tourism

Once visited by merchants and personalities of universal culture, the city exhibits profuse accommodation buildings located in privileged areas of its historic urban centre, which survive the passage of time despite the abandonment or change of function suffered after the decline of the flourishing economic activity that engulfed them. Nowadays, tourism, in addition to the treasured values, is an incipient activity in the city, mostly visited by relatives of locals or guests of the neighboring Cayería Noreste de Villa Clara in its journey through the center of the country.

In addition to the city's architectural, historical and cultural wealth, in the region of which it is the economic center, the Sagua River itself, navigable for more than 30 kilometers from the city's shore to its mouth in the seafaring town of Isabela, famous for its oysters and its century-old port tradition; the nearby Mogotes de Jumagua, second in importance to Cuba and the last redoubt of the natural forests that gave fame to the territory in past times; the southern Sierra de Jumagua, in the westernmost of whose peaks stands the Parador La Roca, a viewpoint over the vast fluvial plain; The Alacranes Reservoir, the country's third water mirror; the Northwest Cayería of Villa Clara, which possesses unique sea legends, boats trapped in its waters, the deepest submerged cavern of the Antillean archipelago (Blue Hole, Ojo del Mégano) and charming beaches that seduce with their isolation, their dreamy blues and their very fine white sand with a soft profile; the Elguea mineral-medicinal water spa, known internationally for the healing properties of its thermal springs, among others.

Launch of Sagua la Grande at FITCuba 2018

The launch of Sagua la Grande as an international tourist destination within the framework of FITCuba 2018 would mark a before and after in local history. The event, which took place on May 4, 2018, would be the result of the execution, with the decisive support of the people, of an extensive investment program aimed at restoring the city's former splendor, an occasion that would serve for the reopening of the Gran Hotel Sagua and the inauguration of the Palacio Arenas Hotel, architectural icons of the Villa del Undoso, as well as other important facilities for tourism service, social works and culture. This program, not yet concluded, aims, parallel to the restoration of the entire historic urban center declared a national monument, the rescue of buildings formerly dedicated to the "smoke-free industry" and the expansion of the extrahotel network, as well as the construction of up to 1830 rooms in the legendary keys Esquivel and Cristo of the nearby Cayería Noroeste of Villa Clara, Eco-accommodations and ecological restaurant in the protected area of Mogotes de Jumagua, rooms near the Alacranes reservoir, the remodeling of the Parador La Roca and the conclusion of the partially finished project of Marina Charter Isabela de Sagua, premiered at FITCuba 2018, among others. Due to its exceptional natural, historical-cultural and landscape values, Sagua la Grande and its vast region have been called to become in the coming years a promising tourist pole of Cuba.

== Transport ==
Sagua is crossed in the middle by the national highway "Circuito Norte" (CN), that runs through the southern part of its municipality. It is served, along with the municipal villages of Isabela, Sitiecito and Nueva Isabela, by the railway line Santa Clara-Cifuentes-Sagua-Isabela, and by the branch line Sagua-Corralillo.

== Climate ==
Sagua la Grande has a tropical savanna climate (Köppen: Aw).

Climate data for Sagua la Grande
Month	Jan	Feb	Mar	Apr	May	Jun	Jul	Aug	Sep	Oct	Nov	Dec	Year
Mean daily maximum °C (°F)	25.2 (77.4)	26.3 (79.3)	27.2 (81.0)	28.6 (83.5)	29.3 (84.7)	30.4 (86.7)	31.0 (87.8)	31.3 (88.3)	30.7 (87.3)	29.2 (84.6)	27.0 (80.6)	26.1 (79.0)	28.5 (83.4)
Daily mean °C (°F)	22.1 (71.8)	22.9 (73.2)	23.6 (74.5)	24.9 (76.8)	26.0 (78.8)	27.2 (81.0)	27.8 (82.0)	27.9 (82.2)	27.3 (81.1)	26.3 (79.3)	24.3 (75.7)	23.2 (73.8)	25.3 (77.5)
Mean daily minimum °C (°F)	19.4 (66.9)	20.1 (68.2)	20.6 (69.1)	22.1 (71.8)	23.5 (74.3)	24.9 (76.8)	25.3 (77.5)	25.5 (77.9)	24.9 (76.8)	24.1 (75.4)	22.1 (71.8)	20.9 (69.6)	22.8 (73.0)
Average precipitation mm (inches)	14.6 (0.57)	12.2 (0.48)	11.2 (0.44)	19.5 (0.77)	46.5 (1.83)	67.5 (2.66)	65.3 (2.57)	69.7 (2.74)	77.0 (3.03)	56.5 (2.22)	28.5 (1.12)	16.8 (0.66)	485.3 (19.09)
Source: Weather.Directory

== Notable people ==
- Mel Martinez, former U.S. Senator (R-FL)
- José Luis Robau, Patriot
- Wifredo Lam, Painter
- Antonio Machín, Singer
- Alberto Morales Ajubel, Cuban-Spanish Illustrator and painter
- Ramón Solís, Flutist
- Joaquín Albarrán, Doctor
- José "Pepe" Núñez, Painter
- Carlos Alvarez del Castillo, R&TV Announcer. President of the Municipality of Sagua la Grande (E)
- Pedro Suárez Rojo, Naturalist, Explorer
- Miriam Cajiga, Republican Party Activist and Vice-President of the Municipality of Sagua La Grande in Exile
- Esteban Gallard, boxer "Kid Charol"
- Peter Henry Emerson, photographer
- Enrique Labrador Ruiz, writer
- Elizabeth Pérez, Cuban Venezuelan Journalist
- Emilio Núñez, Patriot
- Panchito Rodríguez, Doctor
- Concepcion Campa Huergo, Scientific, developed the meningitis B vaccine.
- Rodrigo Prats, Music Composer
- Julian de Palenzuela, Baron de Casablanca
- Edelmira Sampedro y Robato, Countess of Covadonga
- Enrique Sacerio-Garí, Writer, Professor, Artist, Activist
- Oscar B. Cintas, Industrialist, patron of the arts
- Alfredo Sosabravo, Painter
- Justo Espinosa Mondéjar, Lawyer
- Baudilio Espinosa Huet, Writer, Actor
- Jorge Luis "Cuco" López, Actor
- Conrado Marrero, Baseball Player
- Manuel Gayol Fernández, Writer, Professor, Attorney
- César Leal, Painter
- Asenneh Rodríguez, Actress
- Jorge Mañach Robato, Writer, Attorney
- José Antonio Evora, Journalist
- Juan de Dios de Oña y Ribalta, Philanthropist
- Enrique González Mántici, musician
- Raúl Villavicencio Finalé, Historian, Professor
- Cayo Bécquer, Singer
- Michel Martín Pérez, Poet
- Carlos Rendo, New Jersey lawyer and politician
- José Guardiola Alfert, Public Notary, Artist
- Cruz Alvaré, Doctor
- Arnaldo Miguel Fernández Díaz, Journalist, Writer, Attorney, Professor
- Jorge Laureano Moya Rodríguez, Professor, Researcher
- Yoel Rivero Marín, Radio and television producer
- Manuel Ascunce Domenech, teacher

== See also ==
- Sagua la Grande River
- List of cities in Cuba
- Municipalities of Cuba
