= Enrique Sacerio-Garí =

Cuban-American author and professor (born 1945)

- Born: Enrique de los Ángeles Sacerio Garí; 2 October 1945 (age 81); Sagua la Grande, Las Villas, Cuba
- Occupations: Professor and author

Academic background
- Education: Yale University, PhD
- Thesis: Borges: una literatura intertextual

Academic work
- Discipline: Hispanic Studies
- Sub-discipline: Hispanic-American Studies
- Institutions: Bryn Mawr College

Enrique Sacerio-Garí (born 2 October 1945) is a Cuban-American author and was professor of Spanish at Bryn Mawr College from 1977 to 2022. He is most well-known for his poetry and his academic work on Jorge Luis Borges.

== Early life and education ==
Sacerio-Garí was born in 1945 in Sagua La Grande in Cuba. He immigrated from Cuba to the United States in 1959. In Sagua, he studied at the Colegio Sagrado Corazón de Jesús, Academia Rivero and Academia José Martí. He received a B.S. in Mechanical Engineering and an M.A in Spanish from the University of Connecticut, and he attained a PhD from Yale University with a thesis on the literature of Jorge Luis Borges. He was naturalized in 1977. Since 1979, he has travelled back to Cuba multiple times.

He is married to Diana G. Sacerio, a professor of Spanish at The Baldwin School and former professor at Franklin & Marshall and Rosemont College. They have a daughter and a son.

== Career ==
Sacerio-Garí is the Dorothy Nepper Marshall Professor Emeritus of Hispanic and Hispanic-American Studies at Bryn Mawr College. He has written multiple books, participated in international conferences, and given talks in Latin America and Europe on contemporary and historical Cuban culture. He has done extensive academic work on the life and literature of Argentine writer Jorge Luis Borges. He has also translated works of Latin American literature into the English language.

He has helped coordinate cultural exchanges for students and scholars to travel to Cuba both before and after Obama's normalization of relations with Cuba. He founded and directed Bryn Mawr College's tutoring program at Catholic Social Services in Chester, Pennsylvania. He served on the Board of Directors of the Domestic Abuse Project of Delaware County 1993–1999. In 2011, he signed a letter of solidarity in support of Occupy Philadelphia along with other local professors and educators.

== Selected works ==
- Sacerio Garí, Enrique (1976). Comunión: [a concrete poem]. Hamden, CT : R.H. Norton Company.
- Neruda, Pablo (1977). Ode to Typography. Translated by Sacerio-Garí, Enrique. Torrance: Labyrinth Editions.
- Sacerio-Garí, Enrique (Mar 1980). "Towards Pierre Menard". Modern Language Notes. 2 (95): 460–471. doi:10.2307/2906630. JSTOR 2906630.
- Sacerio-Garí, Enrique (1981). Poemas interreales (in Spanish). Poetic Solutions. ISBN 9780972575706.
- Sacerio-Garí, Enrique (1983). "The Double Intuition of Borges/Wells". Comparative Literature Studies. 20 (3): 305–316. ISSN 0010-4132. JSTOR 40246406.
- Sacerio-Garí, Enrique (1984-03-16). "El despertar de la forma en la poesía concreta". Revista Iberoamericana. 50 (126): 165–174. doi:10.5195/reviberoamer.1984.3868. ISSN 2154-4794.
- Sacerio-Garí, Enrique; Rodríguez Monegal, Emir (1986). Jorge Luis Borges / Textos cautivos : ensayos reseñas en 'El Hogar' (in Spanish). Barcelona: Tusquets Editores.
- Sacerio-Garí, Enrique (1987). "Las flores de Borges en García Márquez". Hispania (in Portuguese). 70 (1): 62–66. doi:10.2307/343649. ISSN 0018-2133. JSTOR 343649.
- Sacerio-Garí, Enrique (1999). Poemas interreales. Ediciones Endymion. ISBN 8477313199.
- Sacerio-Gari, Enrique; Hortas, Carlos R. (2006). "Volume 54 / Humanities: 20th Century Prose Fiction: Hispanic Caribbean". Library of Congress.
- Burnt Sugar, Caña quemada (Contributor) (in Spanish). Cork: Free Press. 2006.
- Sacerio-Garí, Enrique (2004). Poemas interreales. Editorial Letras Cubanas. ISBN 9591009739.
- Sacerio-Gari, Enrique (2007). "Poems". Diálogo. 10 (1) – via DePaul University.
- Sacerio Garí, Enrique (2013). Para llegar a La Habana. Poesía (in Spanish). Madrid: Bartleby. ISBN 978-84-92799-60-2.
- Sacerio-Garí, Enrique (2016). El mercado de la memoria (in Spanish). Madrid. ISBN 9788477315933.
- Sacerio-Garí, Enrique (2025). El mercado de la memoria. Santa Clara, Cuba: Editorial Capiro. ISBN 959-265-540-5.
