= Sagua la Grande River =

River in Cuba

Sagua la Grande River is a river of northern Cuba that flows in Villa Clara Province. It is the second longest river in Cuba, and is one of two navigable rivers along with Cauto River. The mouth is located at Isabela de Sagua, in the municipality of Sagua la Grande.

== See also ==
- Sagua la Chica River
- List of rivers of Cuba
