= Wingate School (Spain) =

British school in Tenerife, Spain

- Arona, Tenerife; Spain

Information
- Established: 1982; 44 years ago
- Years: Nursery - Year 13
- Age: 3 to 18
- Enrollment: 560 (2022)
- Language: English

Wingate School is a British international school in Arona, Tenerife, Spain. It achieved the rating of "Outstanding in every category" by British Schools Overseas (BSO) inspectors for the past 2 inspections in a row. It teaches from Foundation to Sixth Form (3-18 years).

== History ==
The school was founded as a primary school by two parents in 1982, and it initially had 7 students: their own two sons and five other expatriate children from the local area.

When the COVID-19 pandemic hit Tenerife in 2020, holidaymakers on the island were quarantined in their hotel. The school staff organised donations from local bookshops and others to provide books and games for the stranded tourists.

In response to the Russian Invasion of Ukraine in 2022, the school offered free tuition to children up to 13 years old who had been forced out of their homes in the conflict. The offer was limited to 24 children (2 per class) in order to keep class sizes down.

The school celebrated its 40th anniversary in 2022 with five of the original seven pupils returning for the event.

== Structure and population ==
The school is divided into sections which reflect the key stages in a similar way to most UK schools: foundation, primary, secondary and sixth form, and follows the national curriculum for England.

When the school was inspected in 2022, it had 433 pupils, all in full-time education at the school. 34 of these were in the infant age range (3-5), 173 juniors (6-11), 197 secondary (12-16) and 29 in further education (aged 17-18).
