= Mogotes de Jumagua =

Coordinates: 22°46′17″N 80°07′47″W

Location of Mogotes de Jumagua in Cuba

The Mogotes de Jumagua are a set of eight elevated limestone features (Spanish: Mogotes) in the Villa Clara Province of Cuba. They are located within the orographic group Heights of the Northwest in the center-north of the island of Cuba, two kilometers south-west from the city of Sagua la Grande.

The pinnacles are of Upper Cretaceous age and are fused to each other, presenting enormous caverns. They have great scientific interest due to the enormous concentration of flora and fauna in a relatively reduced area, forming an ecological small island. Species in the area are vestige of the old primitive Cuban gold coast forests. It was listed as a nature reserve by the Cuban authorities, protecting an area of 4.79 km^{2} (1.85 sq mi).

== History ==
Jumagua's mogotes and more generally Jumagua hills have not been scientifically studied at all before 1970; their use as limestone quarries was considered economically viable and they were visited only by sporadic students or some curious traveller usually looking for gold (according to local legend a pirate hid his treasure in the hills and never came back to claim it). In those times the notions of wildlife refugee or any ecological matter, along with archaeological or speleological importance, was yet to become a social trend.

In the 1970s, however, started an important success story for Cuban naturalists and nature lovers. The Sabaneque Speleological Group from Sagua la Grande started the production of a cartographic map of the region along with a flora and fauna catalogue of the caverns in the mogotes. They discovered that the small caves were actually a well developed subterranean system of caverns with lakes and rivers. Numerous rare endemic animals were also discovered, among them a unique scorpion. Not many species of scorpions live in Cuba; local farmers used to mention a different kind of scorpion that only lived in the mogotes and the scientists' research proved this to be true. They also discovered giant fisher bat colonies, cave tortoises, blind fishes and crabs, and the American eel Anguilla rostrata. The case of the eels is also an impressive example of adaptation since this species usually lives in the ocean and they move into rivers and lakes only to give birth. Fossils like the extinct snail Pseudomiltha sp. and a giant rodent (Megalocnus rodens) that once roamed Cuban forests, were also uncovered. The Megalocnus was so big that is sometimes described by paleontologists as the Cuban bear. Last but not least they also discovered bones and other remains of Cuban indigenous people who lived in the area prior to the Spanish conquest.

But the most important species ever re-discovered belongs to the plant kingdom: the forgotten Palmitas de Jumagua (literally Jumagua's little palms) Hemithrinax ekmaniana, a thrinax endemic to these hills and unique in the world.

From these investigations were produced the first maps of its caverns and the first flora and fauna catalogue (made by the Sabaneque Speleological group) of the whole forest in the mogotes.

The unique specificities of the area, including that of being one of the most important archaeological site of the region, made these little mountains be declared a Natural Park in 1984.

== Local legends ==
In Afro-Cuban mythology, the "Mother of Waters" is a half-serpent, half-woman creature that lives in rivers and ponds and sometimes drowns people and cattle in the depths of her realm. The sons of the Mother of Waters, the "Guijes", are dwarf black children who also live in ponds surrounded by jungle and play pranks on travellers. Jumagua's mogotes — like every small wild place in Cuba — is no different, and for centuries it was claimed that a very large "Mother of waters" was attached to the place. Farmers in the 19th century and the beginning of the 20th century claimed to have seen her or her tracks in the dirt. Since the legend of the scorpion turned out to be true, finding a rather big snake in the caverns was one of the purposes of the Sabaneque Group. There are few big snakes in Cuba, but the group based its research on the hypothesis that a visitor travelling from overseas might have brought a small juvenile anaconda (or a similar snake) that eventually grew up in the area using the caves as shelter. But so far they have never found any bones or skin to prove that a snake has ever been in the hills.

Another colorful story involves pirates. According to the story, one day a Captain disembarked with part of his crew on the Isabella coast and hid a treasure in the mogotes. Heading back to the coast he noticed his second in command was missing, maybe lost, but very soon the captain, a very smart guy, understood that the second officer actually stayed behind in order to steal the treasure for himself. A shoot-out ensued between the pirates and bandits (probably the second officer himself) and the pirates had to head back to the coast empty-handed. This story, true or not, has inspired many locals to go and try their luck in the hills searching for the lost gold.

Historically, all the caves have been camping places for runaway slaves during the colonial period and for mambi warriors of the "Sagua Brigade" during the independence war of 1895.
