= Carlo Morici =

Italian botanist

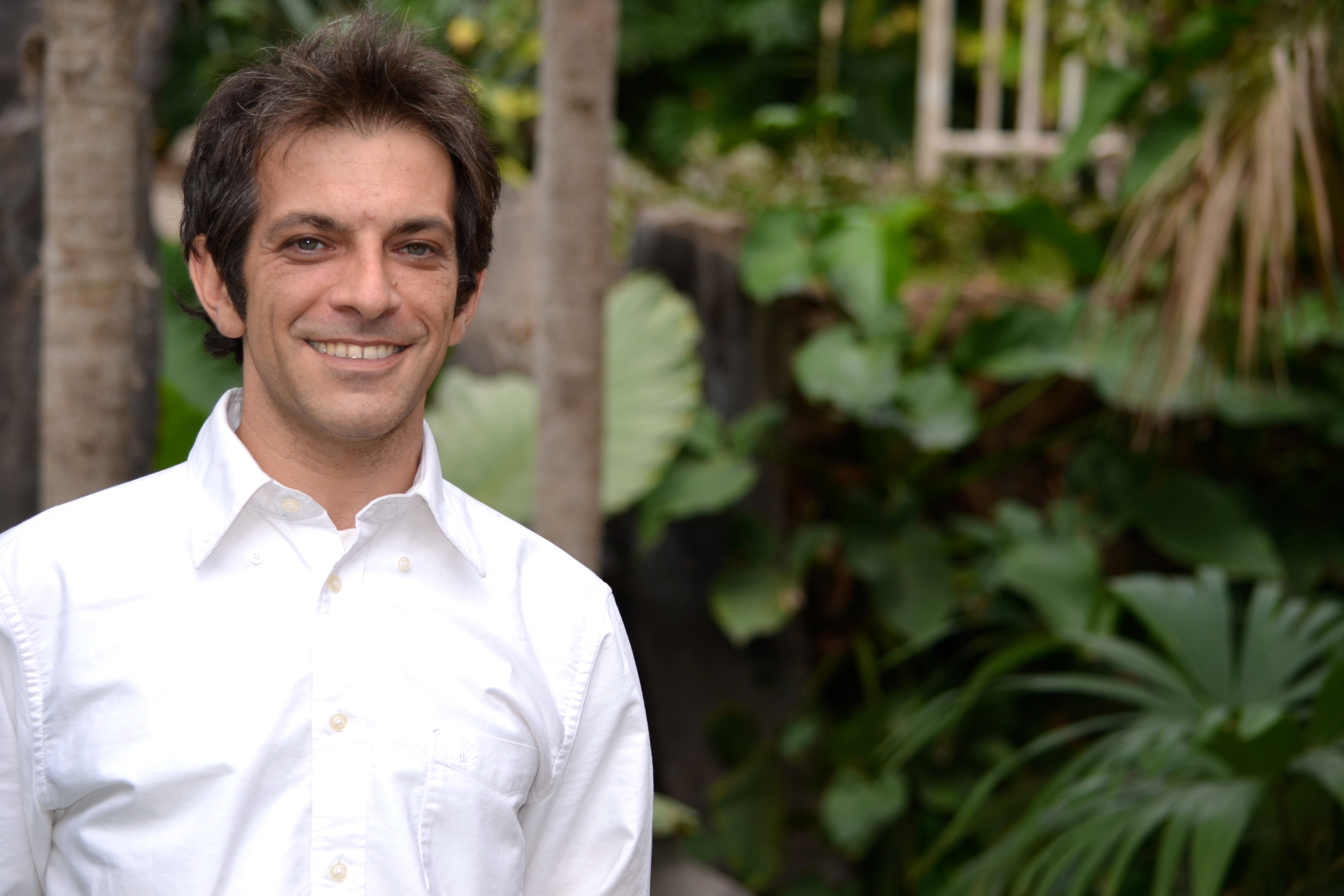
Carlo Morici Portraits Collection

Carlo Morici (born July 8, 1974, in Messina, Italy) is an Italian botanist specialized in palm trees and also known for his landscaping projects.

He develops his research within the field of island ecology as a member of the Department of Ecology at the University of La Laguna in Tenerife. His work encompasses many countries, yet his research focuses on Phoenix canariensis and the palm flora originating in the Caribbean, with a particular focus on the genus Coccothrinax.

In 2006, Morici described a new palm species native to southeast Cuba, Coccothrinax torrida , together with the Cuban botanist Raúl Verdecia.

Morici also works as a landscape designer. Some of his best known projects are the Parque Central de Arona and the Palmetum of Santa Cruz de Tenerife. He was involved with the Palmetum as a botanist during its early years (1996–1999). He later designed new sections of the Palmetum, such as the areas dedicated to the flora of New Caledonia, Hawaii and North America, and the gardens on its southern, sea-facing, slopes.

== Selected publications ==
Palmeras e Islas, in Spanish, on the biogeography of island palms .

La Palmera Canaria: Phoenix canariensis, in Spanish, published in the Canarian magazine Rincones del Atlántico, on the species in habitat .

Article on Coccothrinax boschiana in the journal Palms, in English .

Description of a new palm species in Brittonia, the journal of the New York Botanical Garden: Coccothrinax torrida .

File with pictures of Coccothrinax torrida, in PACSOA (Palms and Cycad Society of Australia) website. .
