= Montgomery Botanical Center =

Nonprofit botanical garden and institution in Coral Gables, Florida

Coordinates: 25°39′40.46″N 80°16′53.8″W

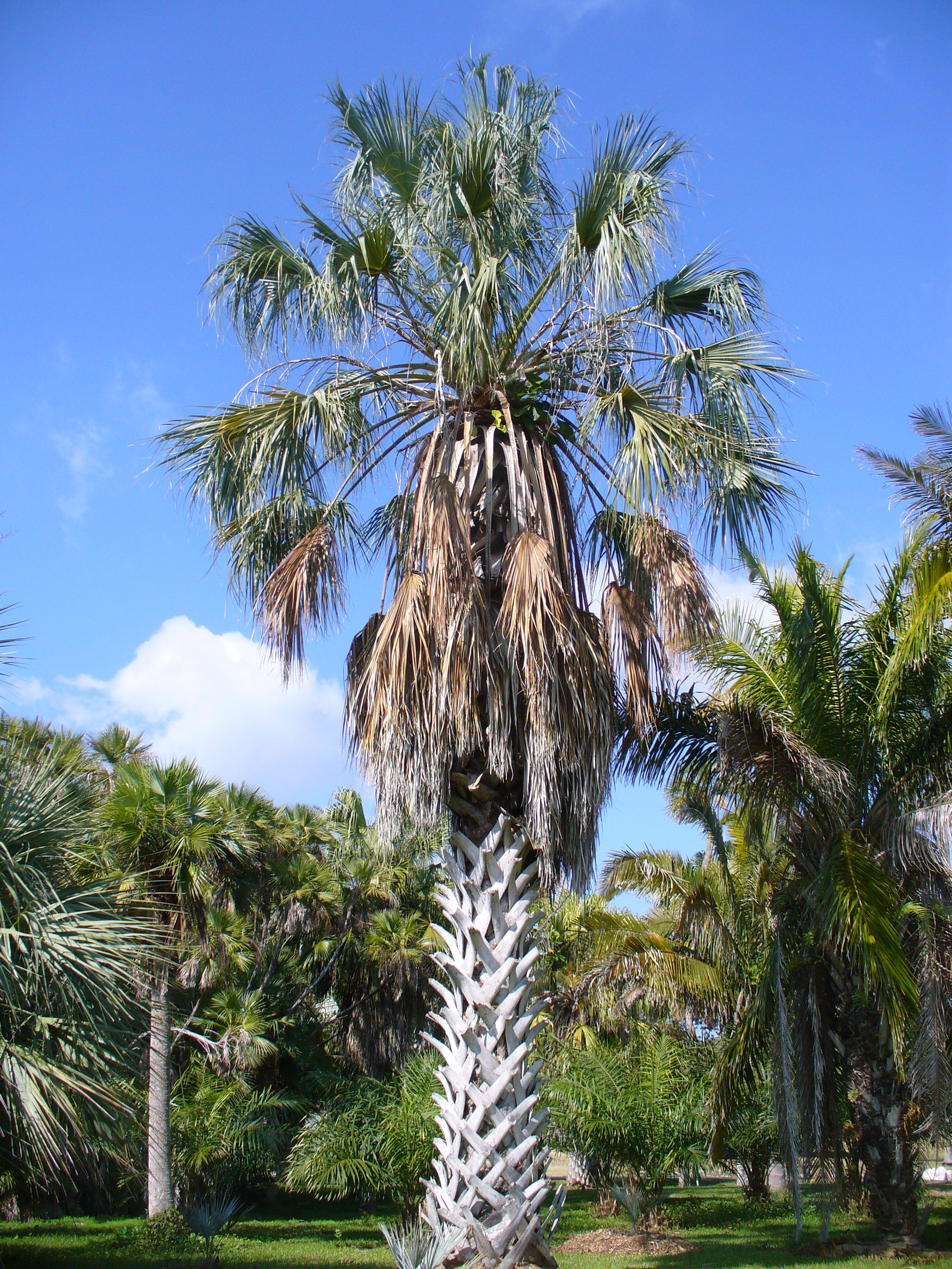
- Sabal uresana at Montgomery Botanical Center
- Interactive map of Montgomery Botanical Center
- Type: Private
- Location: Coral Gables, Florida
- Area: 120 acres (49 ha)
- Created: 1959
- Administrator: Dr. Patrick Griffith
- Visitors: A research institution
- Website: www.montgomerybotanical.org

The Montgomery Botanical Center (120 acres), originally known as the Montgomery Foundation, is a nonprofit botanical garden and institution located at 11901 Old Cutler Road, Coral Gables, Florida. It collects seeds from wild plant populations worldwide, with an emphasis on palms and cycads. The garden is a scientific research facility, and not generally open to the public though reservations for guided tours for individuals or groups are available.

The center was established in 1959 by Nell Montgomery Jennings in memory of her husband, Robert Hiester Montgomery, co-founder of Fairchild Tropical Botanic Garden. It occupies the former site of their estate, the Coconut Grove Palmetum.

Today the property is organized into four geographic areas: the Coconut Grove Palmetum, South Palmetum, Lowland Palmetum, and Research which in turn contains research laboratories, the Montgomery Library, a herbarium, and nursery facilities. The center includes nursery facilities operated by Fairchild Tropical Botanic Garden on eight acres leased by the Center to the Garden.

The center's collections provide genetically diverse population samples of wild-collected palms and cycads, with thorough documentation of each plant. They aim to represent the full morphologic and genetic diversities within a species throughout its known native geographic range. As of 2004 the gardens contained a total of 997 taxa in 4,761 accessions and 10,809 plants. These included:

- Palms - 400 taxa (309 of which were wild collected) in 1,788 accessions (1,048 wild collected) and 5,754 plants (4,248 wild collected)
- Cycads - 202 taxa (172 wild) in 1,033 accessions (802 wild) and 2,758 plants (2,198 wild).
- Dicots, Monocots, Gymnosperms - 395 taxa (81 wild) in 1,940 accessions (1,076 wild) and 2,296 plants (1,219 wild)

The nurseries contained 352 taxa in 1,360 accessions and 14,750 seeds, seedlings, and plants. Although the nurseries suffered extensive damage during the 2005 hurricane season, by 2006 they had been almost fully repaired.

Plants and seeds have been collected in over 50 expeditions to countries and territories including Argentina, Australia, Bahamas, Belize, Bolivia, Brazil, China, Colombia, Costa Rica, Dominican Republic, Ecuador, Guadeloupe, Guam, Guyana, Honduras, Indonesia, Jamaica, Japan, Madagascar, Mexico, New Caledonia, Panama, Papua New Guinea, Paraguay, Puerto Rico, Peru, Philippines, South Africa, Southern Africa, Spain, Thailand, Venezuela, and Vietnam.

In 2018, the Center's executive director, Dr. Patrick Griffith, noted that the garden's palm trees had proved more resistant to saltwater than previously expected. However, Griffith noted, a third of the garden's current property would likely be underwater in a century due to climate change.

== See also ==
- List of botanical gardens in the United States
