= Cuba =

Country in the Caribbean

Republic of Cuba República de Cuba (Spanish)
- Flag Coat of arms
- Motto: Patria o Muerte, Venceremos ("Homeland or Death, We Shall Overcome!")
- Anthem: La Bayamesa ("The Bayamo Song")
- Cuba, shown in dark green
- Capital and largest city: Havana; 23°8′N 82°23′W
- Official languages: Spanish
- Ethnic groups (2012) (Note: Data represents racial self-identification from Cuba's 2012 national census.): 64.12% White; 26.62% Mixed/Mulatto; 9.26% Black
- Religion (2020): 58.9% Christianity; 23.2% no religion; 17.6% folk religions; 0.3% other
- Demonym: Cuban
- Government: Communist state
  - First Secretary and President (Note: The most powerful political position is First Secretary of the Communist Party of Cuba, not President. The first secretary controls the Politburo and the Secretariat, Cuba's top decision-making bodies, making the officeholder de facto leader of Cuba.): Miguel Díaz-Canel
  - Vice President: Salvador Valdés Mesa
  - Prime Minister: Manuel Marrero Cruz
  - President of the National Assembly: Esteban Lazo Hernández
- Legislature: National Assembly of People's Power

Independence from Spain
  - Declaration of Independence: 10 October 1868
  - War of Independence: 24 February 1895
  - Recognized (sovereignty relinquished by Spain): 10 December 1898
  - Republic declared (end of United States occupation): 20 May 1902
  - Cuban Revolution: 26 July 1953 – 1 January 1959
  - Current constitution: 10 April 2019

Area
  - Total: 110,860 km^{2} (42,800 sq mi) (104th)
  - Water (%): 0.94

Population
  - 2025 estimate: ▼9,434,593 (95th)
  - 2022 census: ▼11,089,511
  - Density: 89.8/km^{2} (232.6/sq mi) (125th)
- GDP (PPP): 2015 estimate
  - Total: $254.865 billion
  - Per capita: $22,237
- GDP (nominal): 2024 estimate
  - Total: ▲$252.063 billion (59th)
  - Per capita: ▲$22,957 (60th)
- Gini (2000): 38.0 medium inequality
- HDI (2023): ▼0.762 high (97th)
- Currency: Cuban peso (CUP)
- Time zone: UTC−05:00 (CST)
  - Summer (DST): UTC−04:00 (CDT)
- Date format: dd/mm/yyyy
- Calling code: +53
- ISO 3166 code: CU
- Internet TLD: .cu

Cuba, (Note: /ˈkjuːbə/ KEW-bə, Spanish: [ˈkuβa]) officially the Republic of Cuba, (Note: Spanish: República de Cuba [reˈpuβlika ðe ˈkuβa]) is an island country in the Caribbean. It comprises the eponymous main island as well as 4,195 islands, islets, and cays. Situated at the convergence of the Caribbean Sea, Gulf of Mexico, and Atlantic Ocean, Cuba is located east of the Yucatán Peninsula, south of both Florida and the Bahamas, west of Hispaniola, and north of Jamaica and the Cayman Islands. Cuba is the largest country in the Caribbean by area and the third-largest by population, after Haiti and the Dominican Republic. Culturally, Cuba is considered to be part of Latin America. Its capital and largest city is Havana.

Cuba was inhabited as early as the 4th millennium BC, with the Guanahatabey and Taíno peoples present at the time of Spanish colonization in the 15th century. Cuba's population descends primarily from three groups: pre-Columbian indigenous peoples, chiefly the Taíno and Ciboney, Spanish settlers and immigrants (mainly from Andalusia, the Canary Islands, Galicia, and Asturias), and sub-Saharan Africans brought through the transatlantic slave trade. The territory remained part of the Spanish Empire until the Spanish–American War of 1898, after which it was occupied by the United States and gained independence in 1902. A 1933 coup toppled the democratically elected government of Carlos Manuel de Céspedes y Quesada and began a long period of military influence, particularly by Fulgencio Batista. In 1940, Cuba implemented a new constitution, but mounting political unrest culminated in the 1952 Cuban coup d'état. Batista's autocratic government was eventually overthrown in January 1959 by the 26th of July Movement, during the Cuban Revolution. The revolution established a communist government under Fidel Castro that remains to this day. Castro's government became a major point of contention between the Soviet Union and the United States during the Cold War; the 1962 Cuban Missile Crisis is widely considered to be the closest the world has come to a nuclear war.

During the 1970s through the late 1980s, Cuba intervened in numerous conflicts in support of anti-colonial and Marxist governments or movements across Africa, Latin America, and the Middle East. According to a CIA declassified report, Cuba had received $33 billion in Soviet aid by 1984. Following the dissolution of the Soviet Union, Cuba faced a severe economic downturn in the 1990s, known as the Special Period. In 2008, Castro retired after 49 years; Raúl Castro was elected his successor. Raúl retired as president of the Council of State in 2018, and Miguel Díaz-Canel was elected president by the National Assembly following parliamentary elections. Raúl retired as First Secretary of the Communist Party in 2021, and Díaz-Canel was elected thereafter, becoming Cuba's first leader to have been born after the Cuban Revolution.

Cuba is a socialist state in which the role of the Communist Party is enshrined in the Constitution. Cuba is currently the world's only communist country outside of Asia. Cuba has an authoritarian government wherein political opposition is prohibited. Censorship is extensive, and independent journalism is repressed; Reporters Without Borders has characterized Cuba as one of the worst countries for press freedom. Cuba is a founding member of the UN, G77, NAM, OACPS, ALBA, and OAS. Since 1959, Cuba has regarded the U.S. military base in Guantánamo Bay as illegal and has maintained minefields along its side of the border since 1961.

Cuba has one of the world's few command economies, and its economy is dominated by tourism and the exports of skilled labor, sugar, tobacco, and coffee. Cuba has historically—before and during communist rule—performed better than other countries in Latin America and the Caribbean in literacy. After the 1959 revolution, Cuba performed better than other Latin American countries in infant and maternal mortality, and life expectancy. According to a 2012 study, Cuba is the only country in the world to meet the conditions of sustainable development put forth by the WWF. Cuba has a universal health care system that provides free medical treatment to all Cuban citizens, although challenges include low salaries for doctors, poor facilities, poor provision of equipment, and the frequent absence of essential drugs.

A 2023 study by the US-funded Cuban Observatory of Human Rights estimated that 88% of the population lives in extreme poverty. According to the World Food Programme of the United Nations, rationed food meets only a fraction of daily nutritional needs for many Cubans, leading to health issues. Ongoing since 1960, the United States embargo against Cuba stands as one of the longest-running trade and economic measures in bilateral relations in history.

== Etymology ==
Historians believe the name Cuba comes from the Taíno language; however, its derivation is unknown. Cuba may be translated either as 'where fertile land is abundant' (cubao), or 'great place' (coabana).

Another hypothesis on the name's origin is that the island was named after the town of Cuba, Portugal, supported by those who believe that Christopher Columbus was Portuguese.

== History ==
=== Pre-Columbian era ===
Humans first settled Cuba around 6,000 years ago, descending from migrations from northern South America or Central America. The arrival of humans on Cuba is associated with extinctions of the island's native fauna, particularly its endemic sloths. The Arawakan-speaking ancestors of the Taíno people arrived in the Caribbean in a separate migration from South America around 1,700 years ago. Recent archaeogenetic evidence indicates that this expansion largely replaced the earlier pre-ceramic populations of the island with almost no genetic admixture between the groups. Unlike the previous settlers of Cuba, the Taíno extensively produced pottery and engaged in intensive agriculture. The Taíno practice of tobacco smoking was introduced to Europe by the Spanish and spread globally through the Columbian exchange. The earliest evidence of the Taíno people on Cuba dates to the 9th century. Descendants of the first settlers of Cuba persisted on the western part of the island until Columbian contact, where they were recorded as the Guanahatabey people, who lived a hunter-gatherer lifestyle.

=== Spanish colonization and rule (1492–1898) ===
Christopher Columbus first arrived in Cuba on 27 October 1492 during his famous first voyage and landed the following day. Columbus claimed the island for the new Kingdom of Spain and named it Isla Juana ("John's Island") after John, Prince of Asturias.

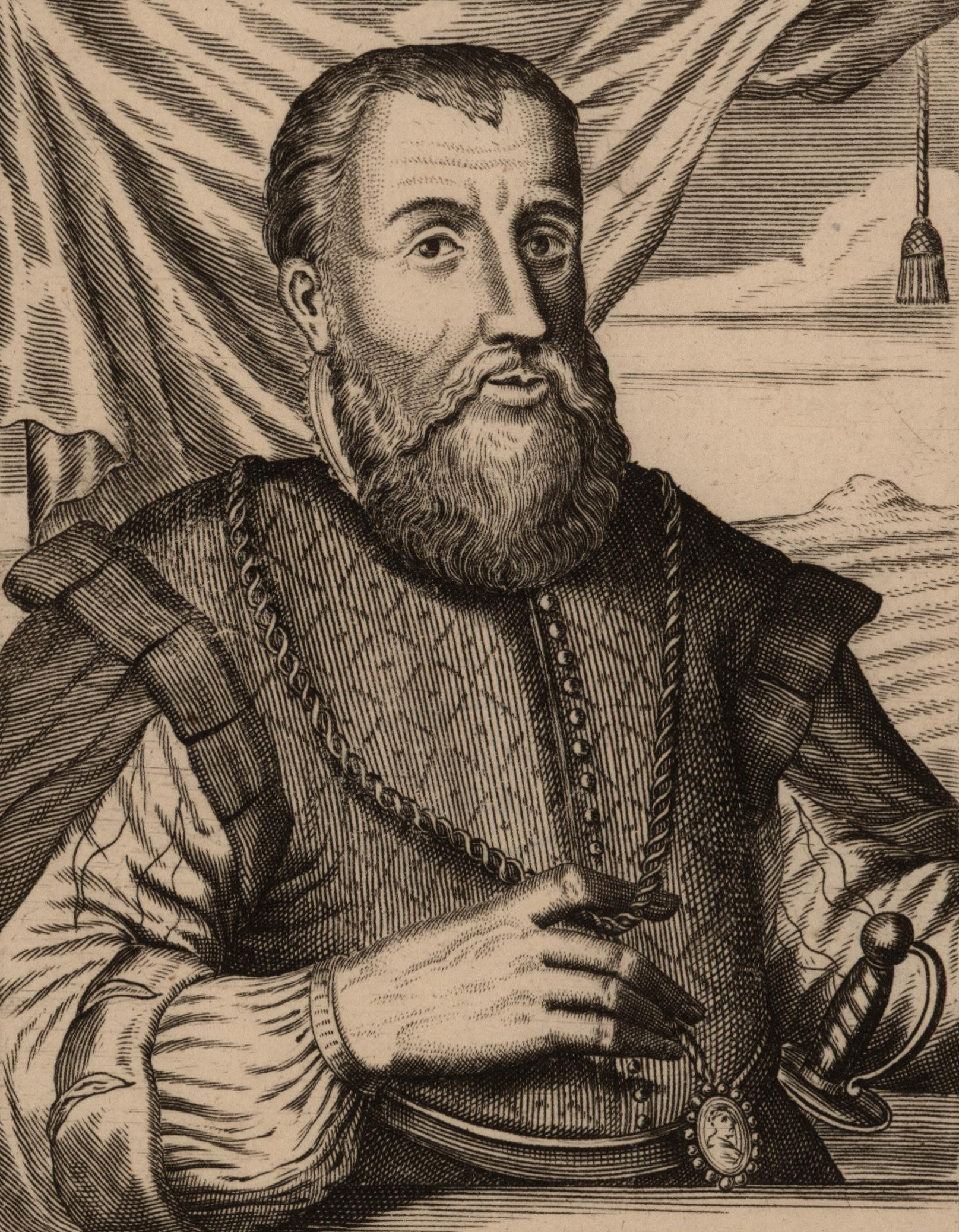
Diego Velázquez de Cuéllar, conquistador of Cuba

In 1511 the first Spanish settlement was founded by Diego Velázquez de Cuéllar at Baracoa. Other settlements followed, including San Cristobal de la Habana, founded in 1514 (southern coast of the island) and then in 1519 (current place), which later became the capital (1607). The Taíno were forced to work under the encomienda system, which resembled the feudal system in medieval Europe. Within a century, the Taíno faced high incidence of mortality from multiple factors—primarily Eurasian infectious diseases to which they had no acquired immunity, aggravated by the harsh conditions of the repressive colonial subjugation. In 1529, a measles outbreak killed two-thirds of those few indigenous individuals who had previously survived smallpox.

On 18 May 1539, conquistador Hernando de Soto departed from Havana with some 600 followers on an extensive expedition through the Southeastern United States in search of gold, treasure, fame, and power. On 1 September 1548, Gonzalo Perez de Angulo was appointed governor of Cuba. He arrived in Santiago de Cuba on 4 November 1549 and declared the liberty of the indigenous population. He became Cuba's first permanent governor, residing in Havana, and he built the first church made of masonry in Cuba. (Note: After the French captured Havana in 1555, the governor's son, Francisco de Angulo, went to the Viceroyalty of New Spain.)

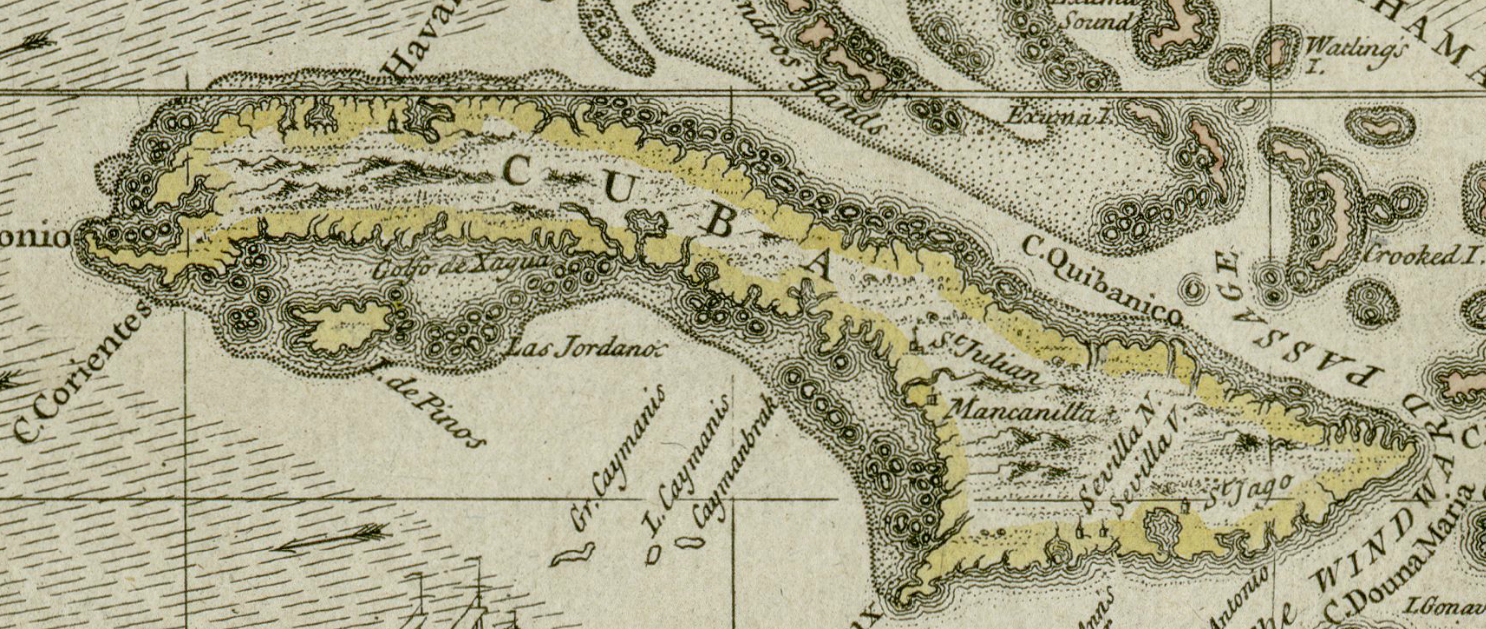
A map of Cuba c. 1680

By 1570, most residents of Cuba had a mixture of Spanish, African, and Taíno heritages. Cuba developed slowly and, unlike the plantation islands of the Caribbean, had a diversified agriculture. Most importantly, the colony developed as an urbanized society that primarily supported the Spanish colonial empire. By the mid-18th century, there were 50,000 slaves on the island. Estimates suggest that between 1790 and 1820, some 325,000 Africans were imported to Cuba as slaves, which was four times the amount that had arrived between 1760 and 1790.

In 1812, the Aponte slave rebellion took place, but it was ultimately suppressed. The population in 1817 was 630,980 (of which 291,021 were white, 115,691 were free people of color (mixed-race), and 224,268 black slaves). The population in 1841 was 1,007,624, of whom 425,521 were black slaves, 418,291 were white.

By the 19th century, the practice of coartacion had developed (or "buying oneself out of slavery", a "uniquely Cuban development"). With a shortage of white labor, blacks dominated urban industries to such an extent that when whites in large numbers came to Cuba in the middle of the 19th century, they were unable to displace black workers. A system of diversified agriculture, with small farms and fewer slaves, served to supply the cities with produce and other goods.

In the 1820s, when the rest of Spain's empire in Latin America rebelled and formed independent states, Cuba remained loyal to Spain. Its economy was based on serving the empire. By 1860, Cuba had 213,167 free people of color (39% of its non-white population of 550,000).

=== Independence movements ===
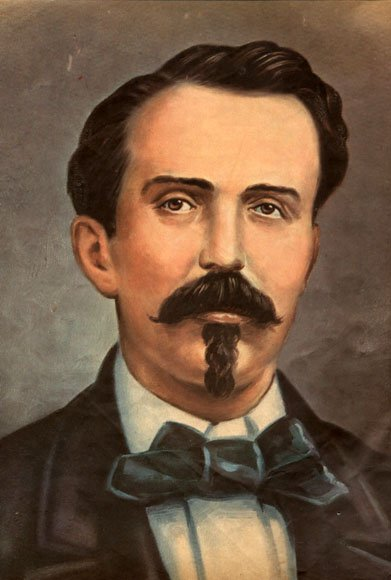
Carlos Manuel de Céspedes is known as Father of the Homeland in Cuba, having declared its independence from Spain in 1868. Céspedes was killed by Spanish troops in 1874.

Full independence from Spain was the goal of a rebellion in 1868 led by planter Carlos Manuel de Céspedes. De Céspedes, a sugar planter, freed his slaves to fight with him for an independent Cuba. On 27 December 1868, he issued a decree condemning slavery in theory—but accepting it in practice—and declaring free any slaves whose masters presented them for military service. The 1868 rebellion resulted in a prolonged conflict known as the Ten Years' War. The Cuban rebels were joined by former Dominican colonial officers, volunteers from Canada, Colombia, France, Mexico, the United States, and Chinese indentured servants, (Note: According to one military historian, "The thirty-eight individuals who responded to the call for independence on 9 October 1868 had almost no military experience. They, and other Cubans, ignorant of the martial skills, were soon joined by a small band of political refugees from Santo Domingo. A number of these individuals had fought for Spain in Santo Domingo following its re-annexation (1861–65). When Spain quit Santo Domingo for the second time, some Dominican colonial officers immigrated to Cuba. Most were unable to find service in the Spanish army in Cuba. Some of these former soldiers joined the new Revolutionary army and provided its initial training and leadership." Mercenaries from Canada, Colombia, France, Mexico, and the United States joined the Cuban Revolutionary Army. Chinese nationals, brought to Cuba as indentured servants, also fought for the cause. By 1876, the Cuban Revolutionary movement was facing internal strife, largely driven by racial tensions. General Máximo Gómez surrendered his command after officers refused to follow his orders because he was Dominican. At the same time, the campaign against Antonio Maceo, a mulatto leader, grew stronger as white factions sought to undermine his leadership because of his race. These racial divisions contributed to a decline in morale within the Revolutionary Army.) but lacked support from wealthy planters and the majority of slaves. In the early stages of the Ten Years' War, Dominicans commanded four of the six insurgent regions in eastern Cuba. Racial, social, and regional bias significantly contributed to the defeat of the Cuban Liberation Army.

The United States declined to recognize the new Cuban government, although many European and Latin American nations did. In 1878, the Pact of Zanjón ended the conflict, with Spain promising greater autonomy to Cuba. In 1879–80, Cuban patriot Calixto García attempted to start another war known as the Little War but failed to receive enough support. Slavery in Cuba was abolished in 1875, with the process completed by 1886. Exiled dissident José Martí founded the Cuban Revolutionary Party in New York City in 1892. The party aimed to achieve Cuban independence from Spain. In 1895, he traveled to San Fernando de Monte Cristi and Santo Domingo in the Dominican Republic to join the efforts of Máximo Gómez. He recorded his political views in the Manifesto of Montecristi. Fighting against the Spanish army began in Cuba on 24 February 1895, and Martí arrived in April. He was killed in the Battle of Dos Rios on 19 May 1895. His death immortalized him as Cuba's national hero.

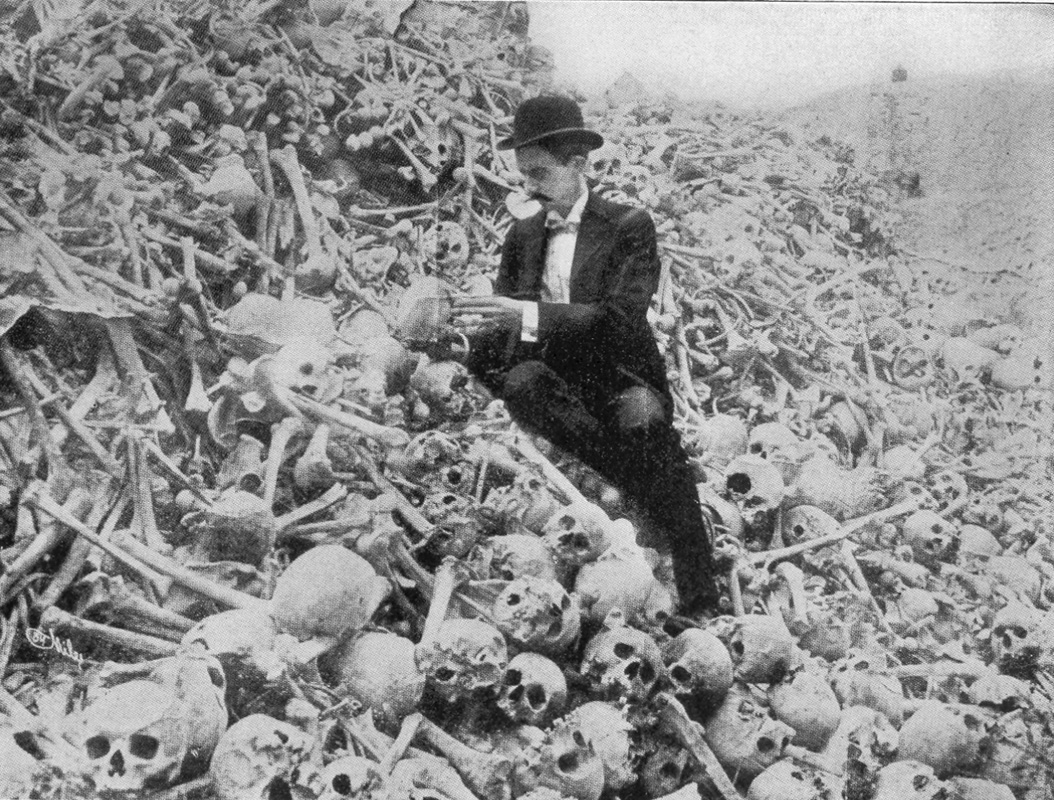
Human remains from the Cuban War of Independence after the Spanish reconcentration policy, 1898

Around 200,000 Spanish troops outnumbered the much smaller rebel army, which relied mostly on guerrilla and sabotage tactics. The Spaniards began a campaign of suppression. General Valeriano Weyler, the military governor of Cuba, herded the rural population into what he called reconcentrados, described by international observers as "fortified towns". These are often considered the prototype for 20th-century concentration camps. Between 200,000 and 400,000 Cuban civilians died from starvation and disease in the Spanish concentration camps, numbers verified by the Red Cross and United States Senator Redfield Proctor, a former Secretary of War. American and European protests against Spanish conduct on the island followed. The U.S. battleship USS Maine was sent to protect American interests, but soon after its arrival, it exploded in the Havana Harbor and sank quickly, killing nearly three-quarters of the crew. The cause and responsibility for the ship's sinking remained unclear after a board of inquiry. Popular opinion in the U.S., fueled by active yellow press, concluded that the Spanish were to blame and demanded action. Spain and the United States declared war on each other in late April 1898.

=== Republic (1902–1959) ===
==== First years (1902–1925) ====
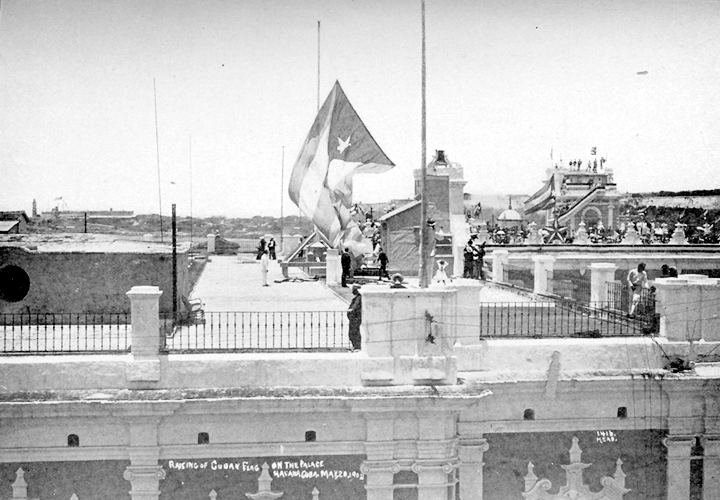
Raising the Cuban flag on the Governor General's palace at noon on 20 May 1902.

After the Spanish–American War, Spain and the United States signed the Treaty of Paris (1898), by which Spain relinquished sovereignty over Cuba and ceded Puerto Rico, Guam, and the Philippines to the United States for the sum of US $20 million The U.S. excluded the Cuban revolutionaries from the peace conference. On 1 January 1899, Captain-General Adolfo Jiménez Castellanos surrendered Havana to General John R. Brooke, ending 400 years of Spanish rule. The destruction of Cuban farms and plantations facilitated the transfer of property to American ownership. Americans invested $50 million, mainly in sugar and tobacco plantations and mining, gaining control over much of Cuba's economy.

With the end of U.S. military government jurisdiction, Cuba gained formal independence on 20 May 1902 as the Republic of Cuba. Under Cuba's constitution, the United States retained the right to intervene in Cuban affairs and to supervise its finances and foreign relations. Under the Platt Amendment, the U.S. leased the Guantánamo Bay Naval Base from Cuba.

Following disputed elections in 1906, the first president, Tomás Estrada Palma, faced an armed revolt by independence war veterans who defeated the meager government forces. The U.S. intervened by occupying Cuba and named Charles Edward Magoon as governor for three years. Cuban historians have characterized Magoon's governorship as introducing political and social corruption. In 1908, self-government was restored when José Miguel Gómez was elected president, but the U.S. continued intervening in Cuban affairs. In 1912, the Partido Independiente de Color attempted to establish a separate black republic in Oriente Province, but was suppressed by General Monteagudo with considerable bloodshed.

In 1924, Gerardo Machado was elected president. During his administration, tourism increased markedly, and American-owned hotels and restaurants were built to accommodate the influx of tourists. The tourist boom led to increases in gambling and prostitution in Cuba. The Wall Street crash of 1929 led to a collapse in the price of sugar, political unrest, and repression. Protesting students, known as the Generation of 1930, turned to violence in opposition to the increasingly unpopular Machado. A general strike (in which the Communist Party sided with Machado), uprisings among sugar workers, and an army revolt forced Machado into exile in August 1933. He was replaced by Carlos Manuel de Céspedes y Quesada, son of the revolutionary hero Carlos Manuel de Céspedes.

==== Revolution of 1933–1940 ====
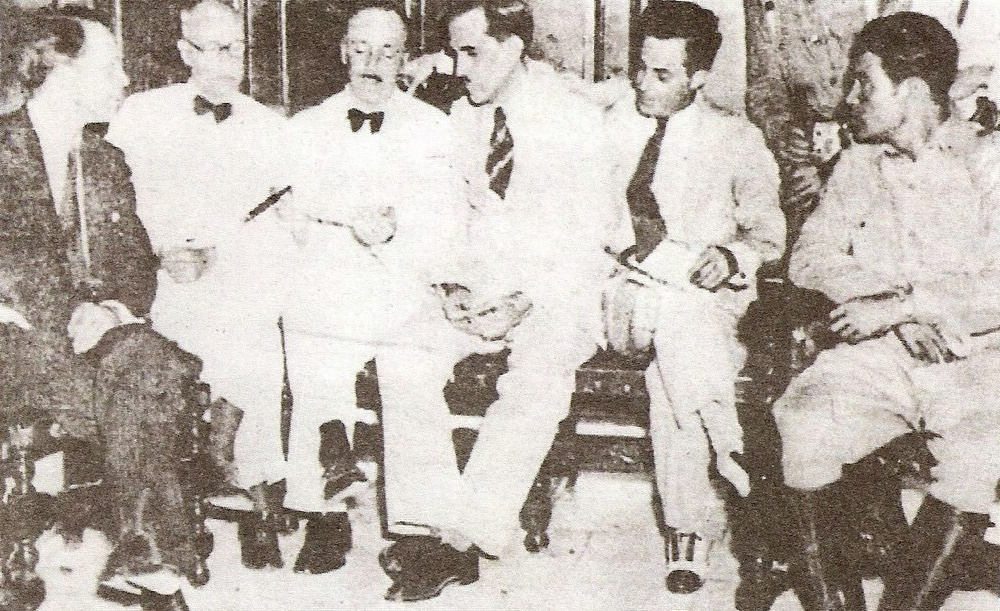
The Pentarchy of 1933. Fulgencio Batista, who controlled the armed forces, appears at far right

In September 1933 the Sergeants' Revolt, led by Sergeant Fulgencio Batista, overthrew Céspedes. A five-member executive committee (the Pentarchy of 1933) was chosen to head a provisional government. Ramón Grau San Martín was appointed as provisional president. Grau resigned in 1934, leaving the way clear for Batista, who dominated Cuban politics for the next 25 years, at first through a series of puppet presidents. The period from 1933 to 1937 was a time of "virtually unremitting social and political warfare". On balance, during the period 1933–1940, Cuba suffered from fragile political structures, with three presidents in two years (1935–1936) and in the militaristic and repressive policies of Batista as head of the army.

==== Constitution of 1940 ====
The 1940 Constitution of Cuba engineered radically progressive ideas, including the right to labor and right to health care. Batista was elected president in the same year, holding the post until 1944. He is, as of 2004, the only non-white Cuban to win the nation's highest political office. His government carried out major social reforms. Several members of the Communist Party held office under his administration. Cuban armed forces were not greatly involved in combat during World War II—though Batista did suggest a joint U.S.-Latin American assault on Francoist Spain to overthrow its authoritarian regime. Cuba lost six merchant ships during the war, and the Cuban Navy was credited with sinking the German submarine U-176.

Batista adhered to the 1940 constitution's strictures preventing his re-election. Grau was re-elected president in 1944. Grau further corroded the base of the already teetering legitimacy of the political system, particularly by undermining the Congress and Supreme Court. Carlos Prío Socarrás, a protégé of Grau, became president in 1948. The two terms of the Partido Auténtico brought an influx of investment, which fueled an economic boom, raised living standards for all segments of society, and created a middle class in most urban areas.

==== Batista regime ====
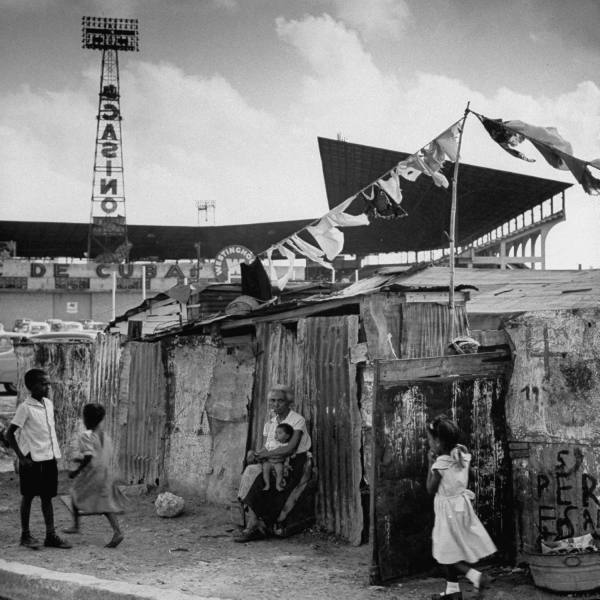
Slum (bohío) dwellings in Havana, Cuba in 1954, just outside Havana baseball stadium. In the background is advertising for a nearby casino.

After finishing his term in 1944, Batista lived in Florida, returning to Cuba to run for president in 1952. Facing inevitable electoral defeat, he led a military coup that preempted the election. Back in power and receiving financial, military, and logistical support from the United States government, Batista suspended the 1940 constitution and revoked most political liberties, including the right to strike. He then aligned with landowners who owned the largest sugar plantations, and presided over a stagnating economy that widened the gap between rich and poor Cubans. Batista outlawed the Cuban Communist Party in 1952. After the coup, Cuba had Latin America's highest per capita consumption rates of meat, vegetables, cereals, automobiles, telephones and radios, though about one-third of the population was considered poor and enjoyed relatively little of this consumption. However, in his "History Will Absolve Me" speech, Fidel Castro mentioned that national issues relating to land, industrialization, housing, unemployment, education, and health were contemporary problems.

In 1958 Cuba was a well-advanced country compared to other Latin American regions, but it was affected by perhaps Latin America's largest labor union privileges, including bans on dismissals and mechanization. They were obtained in large measure "at the cost of the unemployed and the peasants", leading to disparities. Between 1933 and 1958, Cuba extended economic regulations enormously, causing economic problems. Unemployment became a problem as graduates entering the workforce could not find jobs. The middle class became increasingly dissatisfied with unemployment and political persecution. The labor unions, manipulated by the previous government since 1948 through union "yellowness", supported Batista.

In the 1950s, various organizations, including some advocating armed uprising, competed for public support in bringing about political change. In 1956, Castro and about 80 supporters landed from the yacht Granma in an attempt to start a rebellion against the Batista government. In 1958, Castro's 26th of July Movement emerged as the leading revolutionary group. The U.S. supported Castro by imposing a 1958 arms embargo against Batista's government. Batista evaded the American embargo and acquired weapons from the Dominican Republic.

By late 1958, the rebels had broken out of the Sierra Maestra and launched a general popular insurrection. After Castro's fighters captured Santa Clara, Batista fled to the Dominican Republic on 1 January 1959 with his family, going into exile in Portugal. Castro's forces entered the capital on 8 January. The liberal Manuel Urrutia Lleó became the provisional president. Before the revolution, U.S. and other foreign investors dominated the Cuban economy, controlling 75% of arable land, 90% of essential services, and 40% of sugar production. One of the goals of Castro's revolution was to achieve economic independence, but Cuba instead became heavily dependent on Soviet subsidies, with additional economic aid provided by Eastern European countries through COMECON.

Militant anti-Castro groups, funded by the Central Intelligence Agency (CIA) and Rafael Trujillo, carried out armed attacks and set up guerrilla bases in Cuba's mountainous regions, leading to the unsuccessful Escambray rebellion (1959–1965), which lasted longer and involved more soldiers than the Cuban Revolution.

=== Revolutionary government (1959–present) ===
==== Consolidation and nationalization (1959–1970) ====
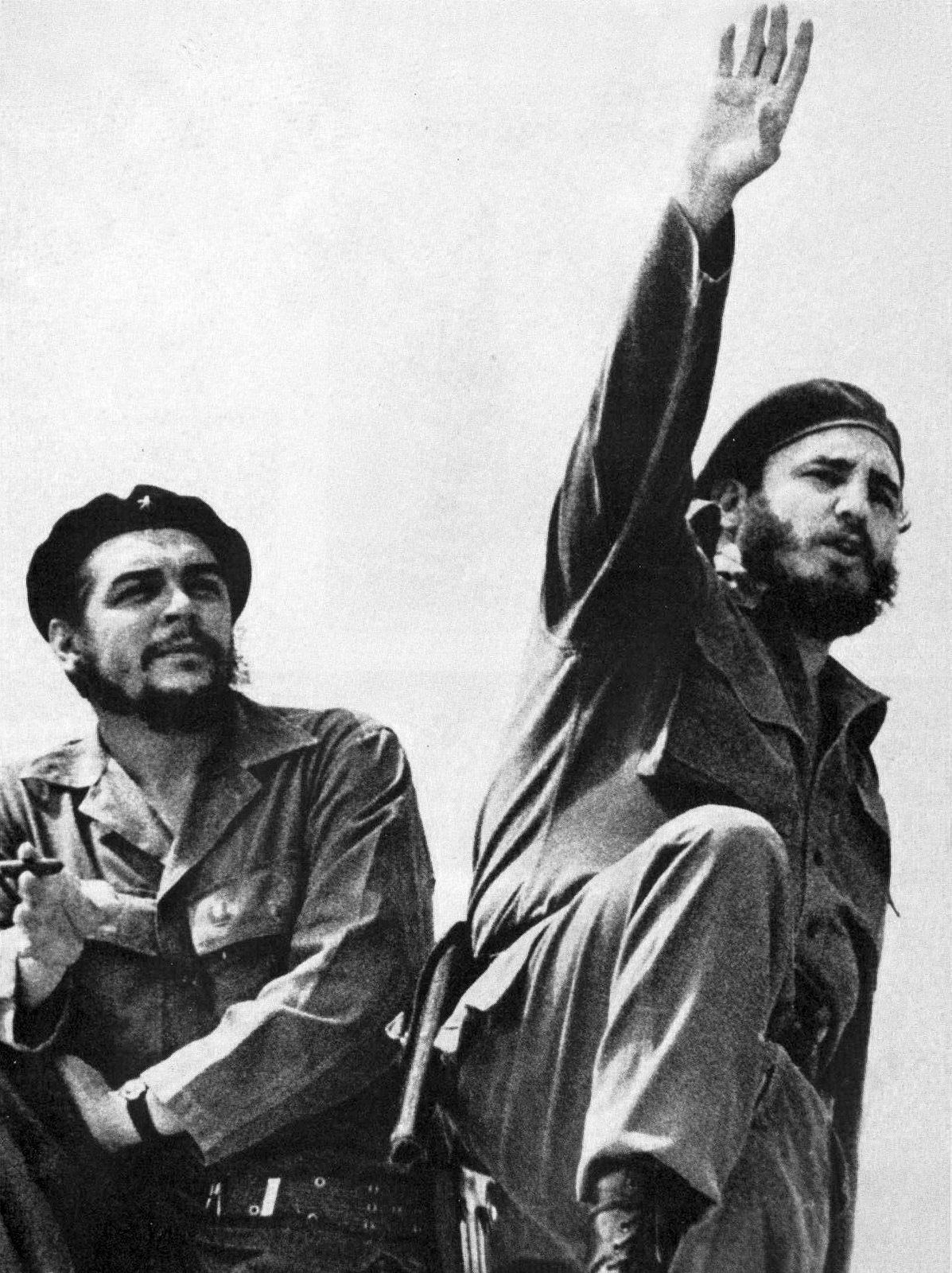
Che Guevara and Fidel Castro, photographed by Alberto Korda in 1961

The US government initially reacted favorably to the Cuban Revolution, seeing it as part of a movement to bring democracy to Latin America. Castro's legalization of the Communist Party and the hundreds of executions of Batista agents, policemen, and soldiers that followed caused a deterioration in the relationship between the two countries. The promulgation of the Agrarian Reform Law, expropriating thousands of acres of farmland (including from large U.S. landholders), further worsened relations. In response, between 1960 and 1964 the U.S. imposed a range of sanctions, eventually including a total ban on trade between the countries and a freeze on all Cuban-owned assets in the U.S. In February 1960, Castro signed a commercial agreement with Soviet Vice-Premier Anastas Mikoyan.

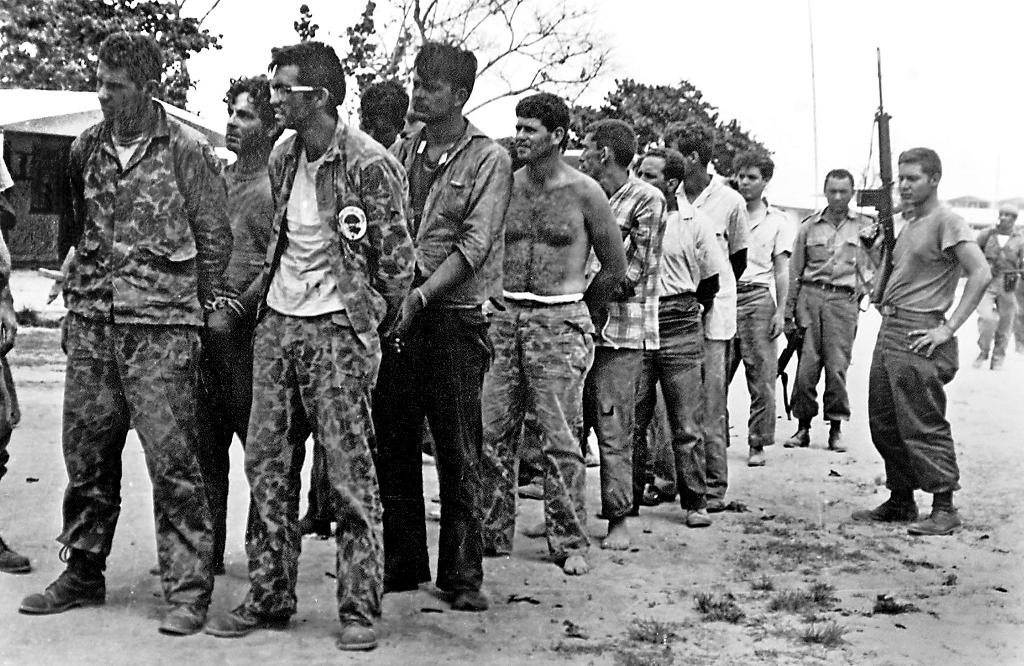
Brigade 2506 prisoners, 1961

In March 1960, U.S. President Dwight D. Eisenhower gave his approval to a CIA plan to arm and train a group of Cuban refugees to overthrow the Castro government. The CIA provided B-26 light bombers and ships to the rebels for the invasion. On 15 April 1961 at dawn, Brigade 2506 flew from Puerto Cabezas, Nicaragua, and carried out preemptive airstrikes on Cuban military airfields at San Antonio de Los Baños, Ciudad Libertad, Pinar del Río, and Santiago de Cuba, destroying five aircraft and damaging an indeterminable number. The invasion (known as the Bay of Pigs Invasion) took place on 17 April, during the term of President John F. Kennedy. About 1,400 Cuban exiles disembarked at the Bay of Pigs. Cuban troops and local militias defeated the invasion by 19 April, killing over 100 invaders and taking the remainder prisoner. Five B-26s were shot down by the Cuban air force, and one was downed by anti-aircraft fire. In 1961, the U.S. and Cuba laid minefields along opposite sides of the Guantánamo Bay perimeter. (Note: At least 18 U.S. servicemen were killed by those mines.) In January 1962, Cuba was suspended from the Organization of American States (OAS), which imposed sanctions of similar nature to the U.S. sanctions. The failed amphibious assault on Cuba contributed to the Soviet decision to deploy R-12 missiles there, and the ensuing Cuban Missile Crisis of October 1962 almost sparked World War III. A settlement was reached without Cuba's participation, under which Soviet missiles were withdrawn from Cuba in exchange for a U.S. pledge not to invade the island. In 1962, American generals proposed Operation Northwoods which would entail committing terrorist attacks in American cities and against refugees and falsely blaming the attacks on the Cuban government, manufacturing a reason for the United States to invade Cuba. This plan was rejected by Kennedy. By 1963, Cuba was moving towards a full-fledged communist state system modeled on the USSR.

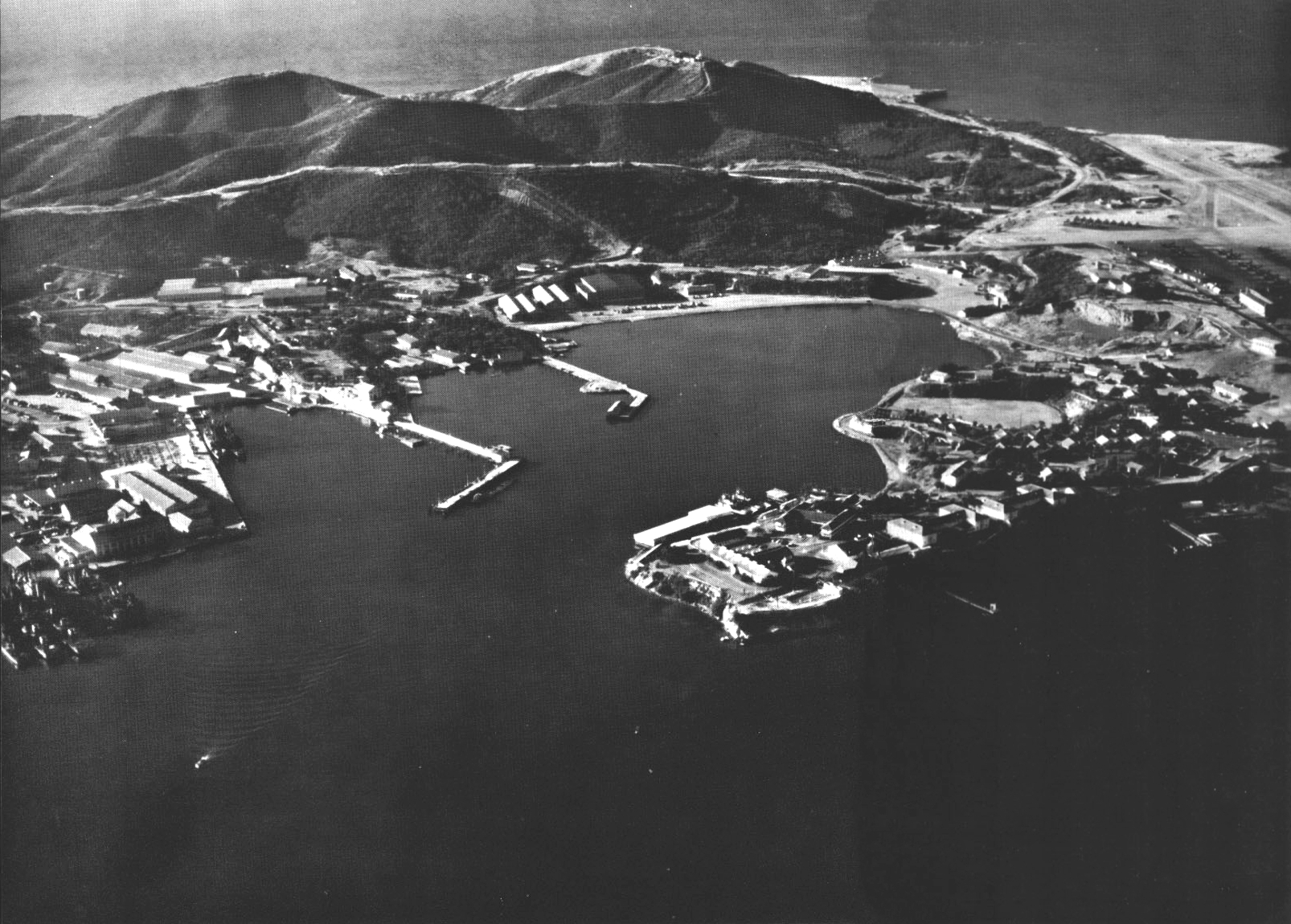
Since 1959, Cuba has regarded the U.S. presence in Guantánamo Bay as illegal.

Eloy Gutiérrez Menoyo founded the anti-Castro group Alpha 66 in the early 1960s, which used small craft to attack Cuban and Soviet merchant ships, killing or wounding crew members. In 1964, Menoyo set up a guerrilla training camp in the Dominican Republic, and after entering Cuba in 1965, he was captured; however, Alpha 66 continued its raids under new leadership. By the mid-1960s, Soviet aid had strengthened the Cuban air force and navy, making raids costly without significant U.S. support.

During the 1960s, Cuba provided support to revolutions throughout Africa and Latin America. Between 1961 and 1964, Cuba sent more than US$1 million as well as arms and military equipment to insurgent groups in Venezuela. In 1963, Cuba sent 686 troops together with 22 tanks, an anti-tank battery, mortars, anti-aircraft artillery, and field guns to Oran to support Algeria in the Sand War against Morocco. (Note: Morocco had U.S. pilots fly its helicopters and had 40 heavy tanks from the Soviet Union, while Algeria had only a dozen French-built light tanks.) The Moroccan government backed down before the planned Cuban counterattack on 29 October and agreed to a ceasefire and suspension of hostilities. The Cuban forces remained in Algeria for over a year, providing training to the Algerian army. Che Guevara, authorized by Castro, engaged in guerrilla activities in Africa and was killed in 1967 while attempting to start a revolution in Bolivia. Cuba supplied arms to the People's Movement for the Liberation of Angola; gave aid to the African Party for the Independence of Guinea and Cape Verde; and provided military training to the Mozambique Liberation Front. Cuban troops prevented the 1966 Republic of the Congo coup attempt; the coup collapsed when the Congolese army refused to engage in combat against the Cubans. Cuban advisors began operating with guerrillas in the Guinea-Bissau War of Independence, and in November 1969 Portuguese troops captured Cuban Captain Pedro Rodriguez Peralta.

Starting in 1968, a campaign titled the "revolutionary offensive" was initiated to nationalize some 58,000 remaining private small businesses. The campaign would spur industrialization in Cuba and focus the economy on sugar production, with a goal of 10 million tons by 1970. The economic focus on sugar production involved international volunteers and the mobilization of workers from all sectors of the economy. Economic mobilization coincided with greater militarization of political structures and society in general. The harvest goal was not reached. The economy fell into decline after large sectors were neglected after urban labor was mobilized to the countryside.

The standard of living in the 1970s was "extremely spartan," and discontent was rife. Castro admitted the failures of economic policies in a 1970 speech. In 1975, the OAS lifted its sanctions against Cuba with the approval of 16 member states, including the United States. The U.S., however, maintained its own sanctions. According to Amnesty International, official death sentences from 1959 to 1987 numbered 237, of which all but 21 were carried out. The vast majority of those executed directly following the 1959 Revolution were policemen, politicians, and informers of the Batista regime accused of crimes such as torture and murder, and their public trials and executions had widespread popular support among the Cuban population.

==== Foreign interventions (1971–1991) ====
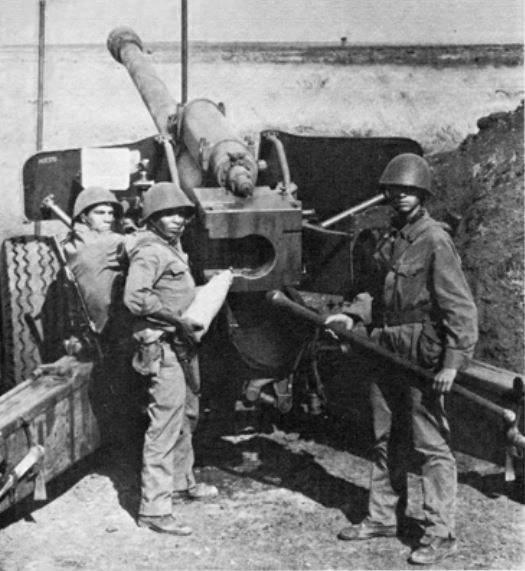
Cuban artillery crew in Ethiopia during the Ogaden War.

During the Cold War, Cuba received $33 billion in Soviet aid, and Cuban forces were deployed to all corners of Africa, either as military advisors or as combatants. Soviet pilots and technicians assumed defense duties in Cuba, freeing up personnel to be deployed in Africa. In 1979, the U.S. objected to the presence of Soviet combat troops on the island.

In November 1975, Cuba deployed more than 65,000 troops and 400 Soviet-made tanks in Angola in one of the fastest military mobilizations in history. South Africa developed nuclear weapons because of the threat to its security posed by the presence of large numbers of Cuban troops in Angola. In 1975–76 and again in 1988 at the Battle of Cuito Cuanavale, the Cubans alongside their MPLA allies fought UNITA rebels and apartheid South African forces. On 13 November 1977, Somalia broke diplomatic relations with Cuba and expelled Cuban and Soviet military advisors. In December 1977, Cuba sent its combat troops from Angola, the People's Republic of the Congo, and the Caribbean to Ethiopia, assisted by mechanized Soviet battalions, to help defeat a Somali invasion of the Ogaden. On 24 January 1978, Ethiopian and Cuban troops counterattacked, inflicting 3,000 casualties on the Somali forces. In February, Cuban forces launched a major offensive with 10,000 to 12,000 troops and 30 pilots flying Soviet-supplied aircraft, forcing the Somali army back into its own territory by 9 March. Cuban forces remained in Ethiopia until September 1989.

Despite its small size and the long distance separating it from the Middle East, Cuba played an active role in the region during the Cold War. In 1972, a major military mission consisting of tank, air, and artillery specialists was dispatched to South Yemen. Cuban military advisors were sent to Iraq in the mid-1970s, but their mission was canceled after Iraq invaded Iran in 1980. The Cubans were also involved in the Syrian-Israeli conflict in 1973 and 1974 that followed the Yom Kippur War. Israeli sources reported the presence of a Cuban tank brigade in the Golan Heights, which was supported by two brigades. Tank forces engaged in battle on the Golan front. In June 1978, Soviet aircraft transported 1,000 Cuban troops from Ethiopia to South Yemen following a coup there; in March 1979, Soviet aircraft flew 1,500 Cuban troops to South Yemen during an open conflict between Aden and Sanaa.

After the U.S. was defeated by communist forces in the Vietnam War, Castro began supporting Marxist insurgencies in Guatemala, El Salvador, Nicaragua, and Colombia by supplying weapons, munitions, and training. Following the 1983 coup that resulted in the execution of Grenadian Prime Minister Maurice Bishop and establishment of the military government led by Hudson Austin, U.S. forces invaded Grenada in 1983, overthrowing the pro-Castro government. In a few days of fighting, 6,000 American combat troops defeated 784 Cubans (636 construction workers with military training, 43 military advisors, and 18 diplomats).

Cuba gradually withdrew its troops from Angola in 1989–91. An important psychological and political aspect of the Cuban military involvement in Africa was the significant presence of black or mixed-race soldiers among the Cuban forces. According to one source, more than 300,000 Cuban military personnel and civilian experts were deployed in Africa. The source also states that out of the 50,000 Cubans sent to Angola, half contracted AIDS, and that 10,000 Cubans died as a consequence of their military actions in Africa. Cuban troops allegedly committed atrocities in Africa.

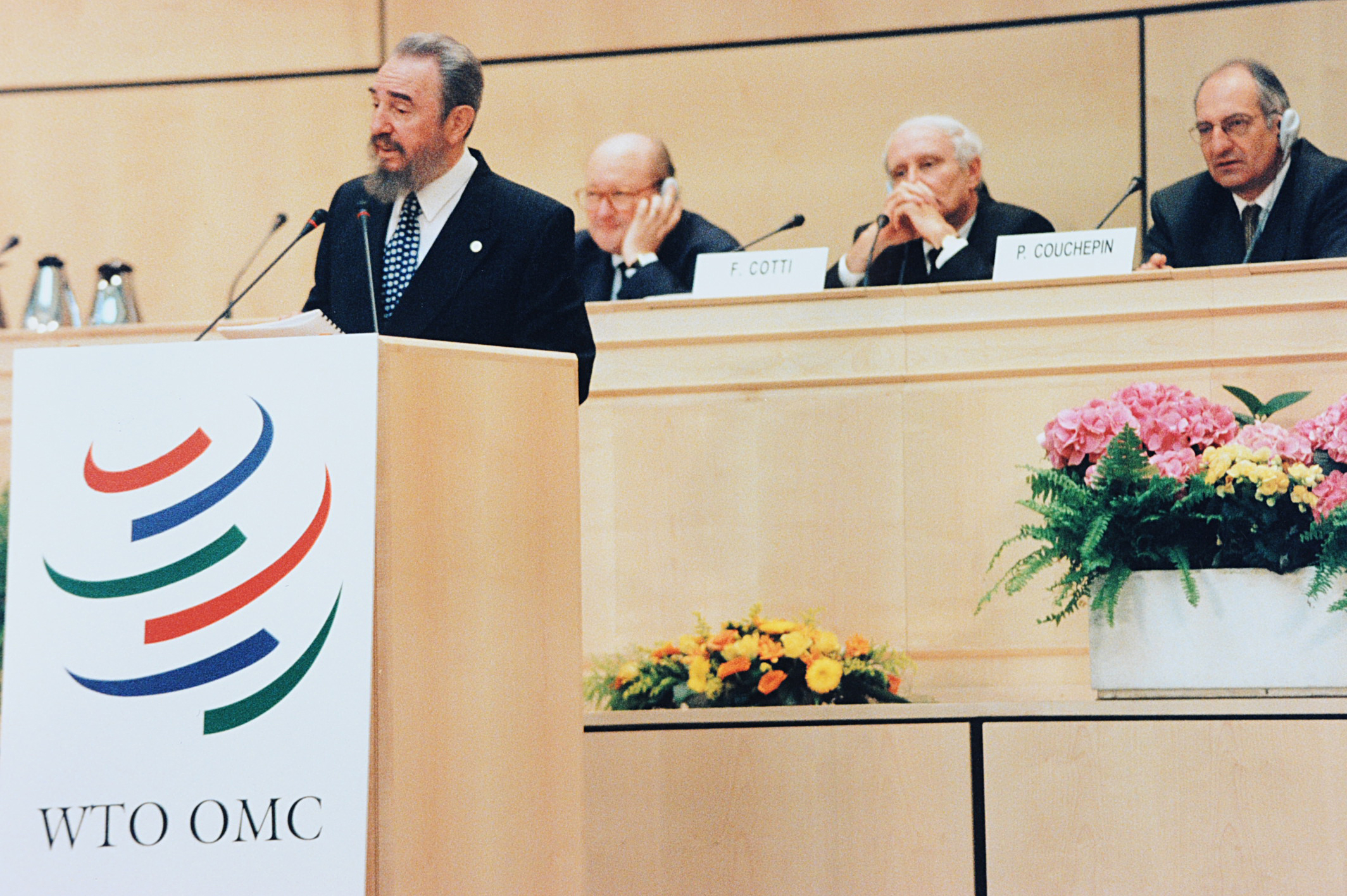
Cuban leader Fidel Castro in Geneva, Switzerland, May 1998

==== Political readjustments (1991–present) ====
Soviet troops began to withdraw from Cuba in September 1991, and Castro's rule was severely tested in the aftermath of the Soviet collapse in December 1991 (known in Cuba as the Special Period). The country faced a severe economic downturn following the withdrawal of Soviet subsidies worth $4 billion to $6 billion annually, resulting in effects such as food and fuel shortages. The government did not accept American donations of food, medicines and cash until 1993. On 5 August 1994, state security dispersed protesters in a spontaneous protest in Havana. From the start of the crisis until 1995, Cuba saw its gross domestic product (GDP) shrink by 35%. It took another five years for its GDP to reach pre-crisis levels. In 1996, after Cuban fighter jets shot down two small aircraft piloted by a Florida-based anti-Castro group, the U.S. Congress passed the Helms–Burton Act, strengthening U.S. embargoes.

Cuba then found a new source of aid and support in the People's Republic of China. In addition, Castro, Venezuelan President Hugo Chávez and Bolivian President Evo Morales became allies, and both countries began to support the Cuban economy. In 2003, the government arrested and imprisoned a large number of civil activists, a period known as the "Black Spring".

In February 2008, Castro resigned as President of the State Council due to illness. On 24 February, the National Assembly elected his brother Raúl Castro as president. In his inauguration speech, Raúl promised that some of the restrictions on freedom in Cuba would be removed. In March 2009, Raúl Castro removed some of his brother's appointees. In 2009 the OAS adopted a resolution to end the 47-year ban on Cuban membership of the group. The resolution stated, however, that full membership would be delayed until Cuba was "in conformity with the practices, purposes, and principles of the OAS". Fidel Castro wrote that Cuba would not rejoin the OAS, which he said was a "U.S. Trojan horse" and "complicit" in actions taken by the U.S. against Cuba and other Latin American nations.

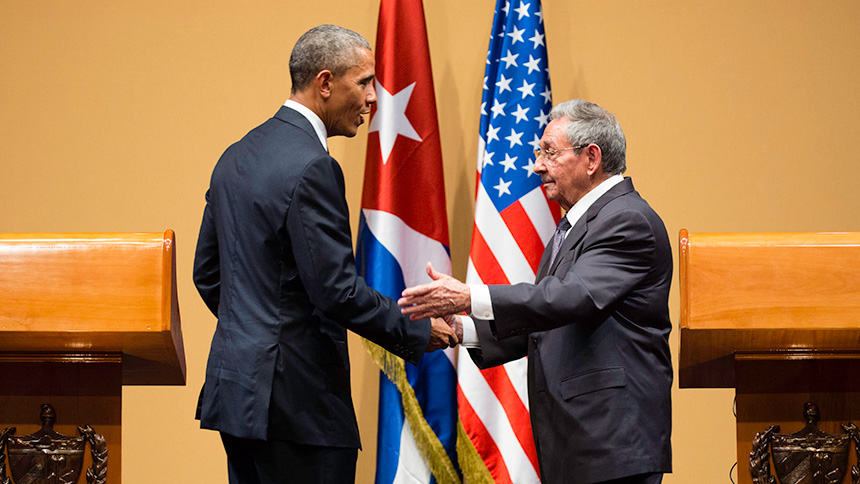
Raúl Castro and U.S. President Barack Obama at their joint press conference in Havana, Cuba, 21 March 2016

In 2013 Cuba ended the requirement established in 1961 that any citizens who wished to travel abroad were required to obtain an expensive government permit and a letter of invitation. In 1961 the Cuban government had imposed broad restrictions on travel to prevent the mass emigration of people after the 1959 revolution; it approved exit visas only on rare occasions. In the first year of the program, over 180,000 left Cuba and returned. Talks with American officials, including President Barack Obama, resulted in the 2014 release of Alan Gross, 52 political prisoners, and an unnamed non-citizen agent of the United States in return for the release of three Cubans who had been convicted of espionage in the United States. The embargo between the United States and Cuba was relaxed to allow import, export, and certain limited commerce.

Raúl Castro stepped down from the presidency in 2018, and Miguel Díaz-Canel was elected president of the State Council by the National Assembly following parliamentary elections. Raúl Castro remained the First Secretary of the Communist Party and retained broad authority, including oversight over the president.

Cuba approved a new constitution in 2019. The optional vote attracted 84.4% of eligible voters; 90% of those who voted approved the constitution, and 9% opposed it. The constitution states that the Communist Party is the only legitimate political party, describes access to health and education as fundamental rights, imposes presidential term limits, enshrines the right to legal representation upon arrest, recognizes private property, and strengthens the rights of multinationals investing with the state. Any form of discrimination harmful to human dignity is banned under the constitution.

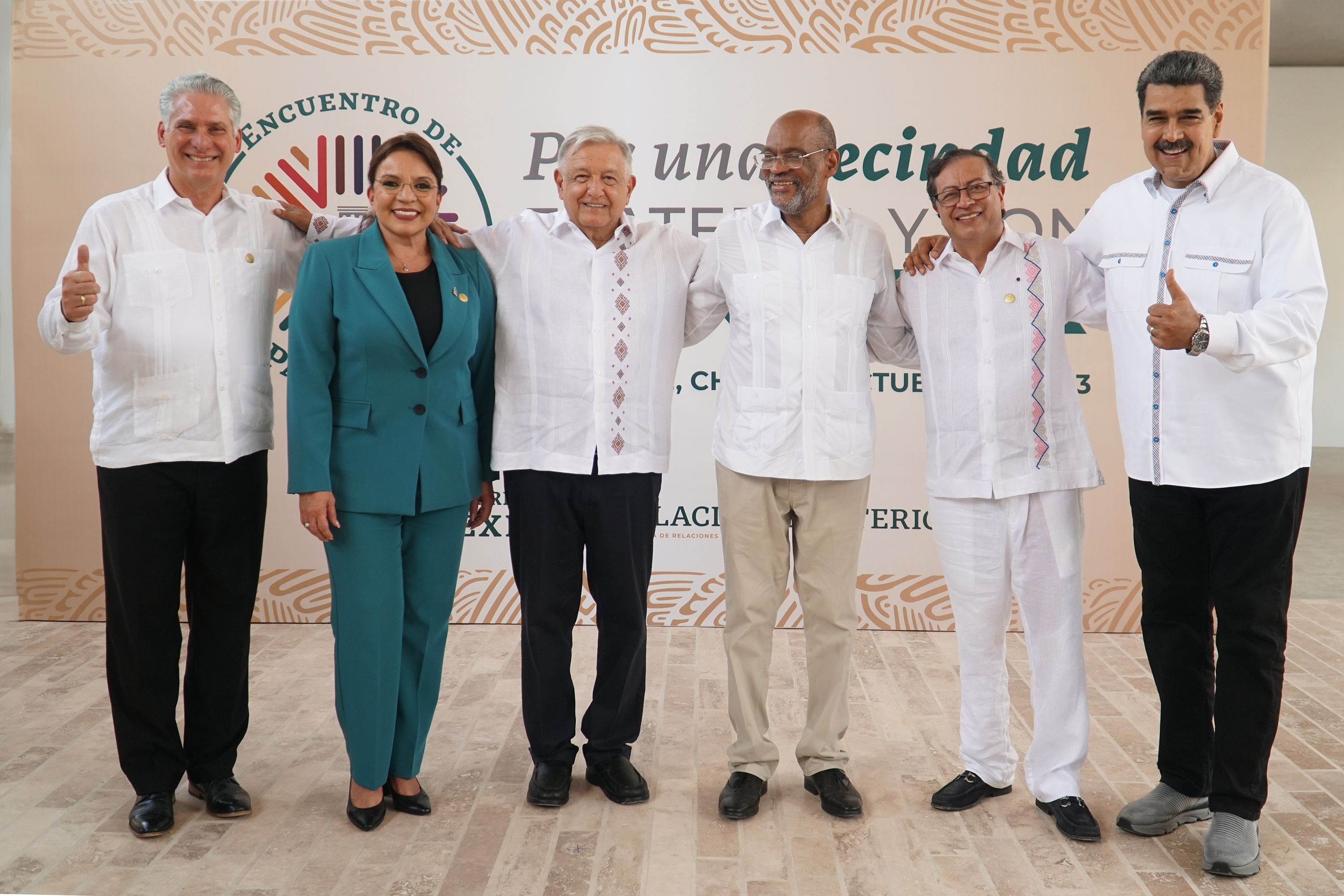
Cuban President Miguel Díaz-Canel with Venezuelan President Nicolás Maduro, Mexican President López Obrador and other leaders in Palenque, Mexico, 22 October 2023

In 2021 U.S. President Donald Trump added Cuba to the State Sponsors of Terrorism list, implementing a series of additional economic sanctions on the country. Díaz-Canel succeeded Castro as first secretary of the Communist Party. In July 2021, there were several large protests against the government. Cuban exiles also conducted protests overseas.

The 2024–2026 Cuba blackouts were the most severe living crisis that the country has experienced since the dissolution of the Soviet Union in 1991. Díaz-Canel blamed the blackout on the United States embargo against Cuba, which he said prevented much needed supplies and replacement parts from reaching Cuba.

In February 2026, following the United States intervention in Venezuela, which was a major oil supplier to Cuba, and expansion of US sanctions on trade with Cuba, Cuba experienced widespread energy shortages, resulting in rolling blackouts, hospital shortages and flight cancellations, culminating in the 2026 Cuban crisis. UN experts have condemned the executive order issued by the Trump administration, describing the imposition of a fuel blockade on Cuba as "a serious violation of international law and a grave threat to a democratic and equitable international order."

== Geography ==
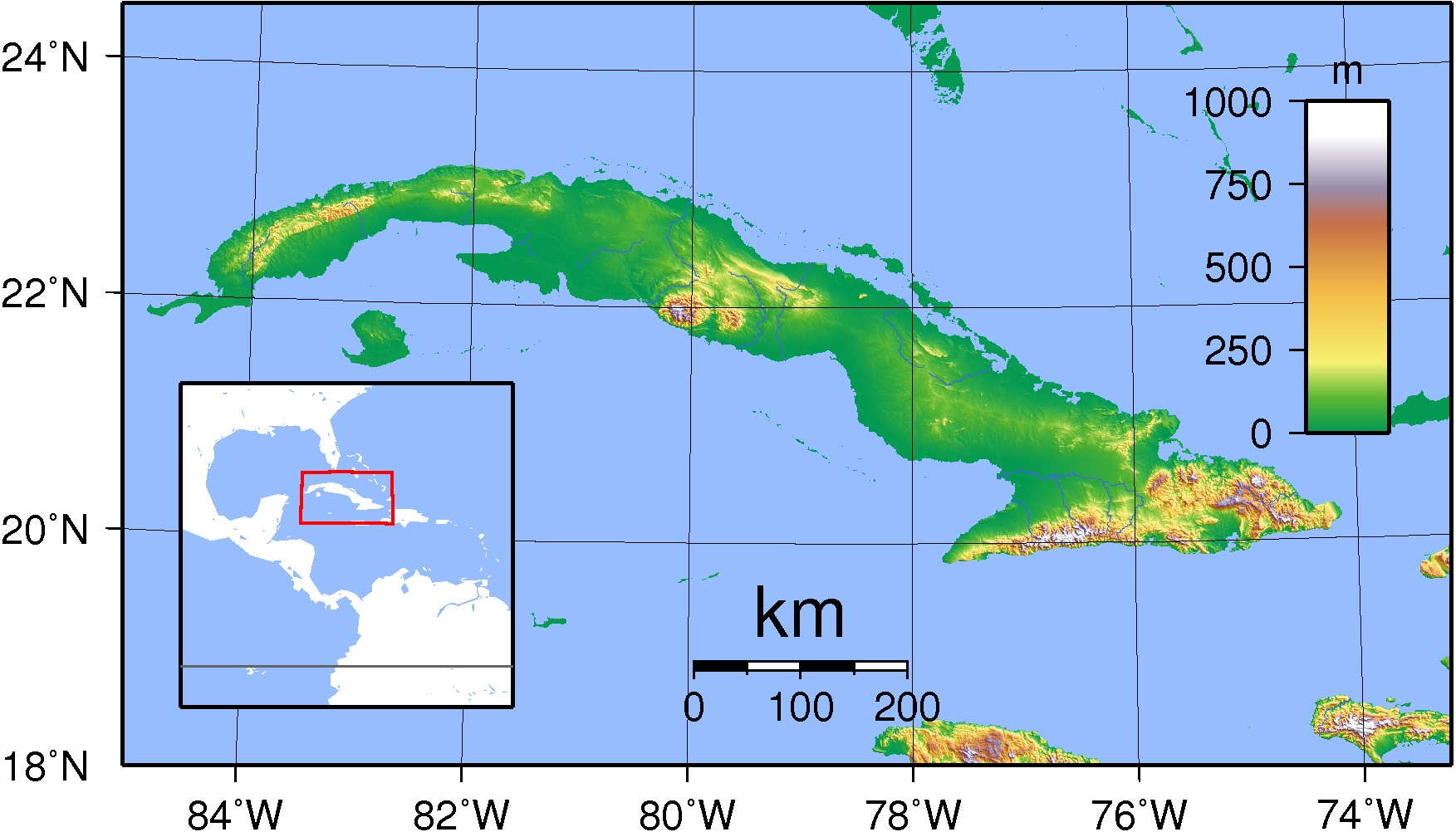
Topographic map of Cuba

Cuba is an archipelago of 4,195 islands, cays and islets located in the northern Caribbean Sea at the convergence of the Gulf of Mexico and the Atlantic Ocean. It lies between latitudes 19° and 24°N, and longitudes 74° and 85°W. Key West, Florida, is about 150 km (93 miles) across the Straits of Florida to the north and northwest, and The Bahamas (Cay Lobos) 22.5 km (14 mi) to the north. Mexico lies 210 km (130.5 mi) west across the Yucatán Channel (to the closest tip of Cabo Catoche). Haiti is 78 km (48.5 mi) east and Jamaica 148 km (92 mi) south.

Cuba is the principal island, surrounded by four smaller groups of islands: the Colorados Archipelago on the northwestern coast, the Sabana-Camagüey Archipelago on the north-central Atlantic coast, the Jardines de la Reina on the south-central coast and the Canarreos Archipelago on the southwestern coast. The main island, named Cuba, is 1,250 km (780 mi) long, constituting most of the nation's land area (104,338 km^{2} or 40,285 sq mi) and is the largest island in the Caribbean and 17th-largest island in the world. The main island consists mostly of flat to rolling plains apart from the Sierra Maestra mountains in the southeast, whose highest point is Pico Turquino (1,974 m or 6,476 ft). The second-largest island is Isla de la Juventud in the Canarreos Archipelago, with an area of 2,204 km^{2} (851 sq mi). Cuba has an official area of 109,884 km^{2} (42,426 sq mi). Its area is 110,860 km^{2} (42,803 sq mi) according to the CIA.

=== Climate ===
Köppen climate classification of Cuba

With the entire island south of the Tropic of Cancer, the local climate is tropical, moderated by northeasterly trade winds that blow year-round. The temperature is also shaped by the Caribbean Current which brings in warm water from the Equator. This makes the climate of Cuba warmer than that of Hong Kong, which is at around the same latitude as Cuba but has a subtropical rather than a tropical climate. In general (with local variations), there is a drier season from November to April, and a rainier season from May to October. The average temperature is 21 °C (70 °F) in January and 27 °C (81 °F) in July. The warm temperatures of the Caribbean Sea and the fact that Cuba sits across the entrance to the Gulf of Mexico combine to make the country prone to frequent hurricanes. These are most common in September and October.

Climate change is causing an increase in temperature, rising sea levels and shifting precipitation patterns, with an overall decrease in rainfall predicted. These will severely impact industries key to the economy, including agriculture, forestry and tourism. As rainfall is Cuba's only water source, water security is an issue. Warmer temperatures may affect the health of the population, causing an increase in cardiovascular, respiratory and viral diseases. A temperature rise of 2 °C above preindustrial levels can increase the likelihood of extreme hurricane rainfall by three times in Cuba. Climate change mitigation and adaptation plans include renewable energy generation and nature-based solutions, such as restoring mangrove ecosystems.

Hurricane Irma hit the island on 8 September 2017, with winds of 260 km/h (160 mph), at the Camagüey Archipelago. The worst damage was in the keys north of the main island. Hospitals, warehouses and factories were damaged; much of the north coast was without electricity. Nearly one million people, including tourists, were evacuated. The Varadero resort area reported widespread damage. Ten people were killed during the storm, including seven in Havana, most during building collapses. Sections of the capital had been flooded.

=== Biodiversity ===
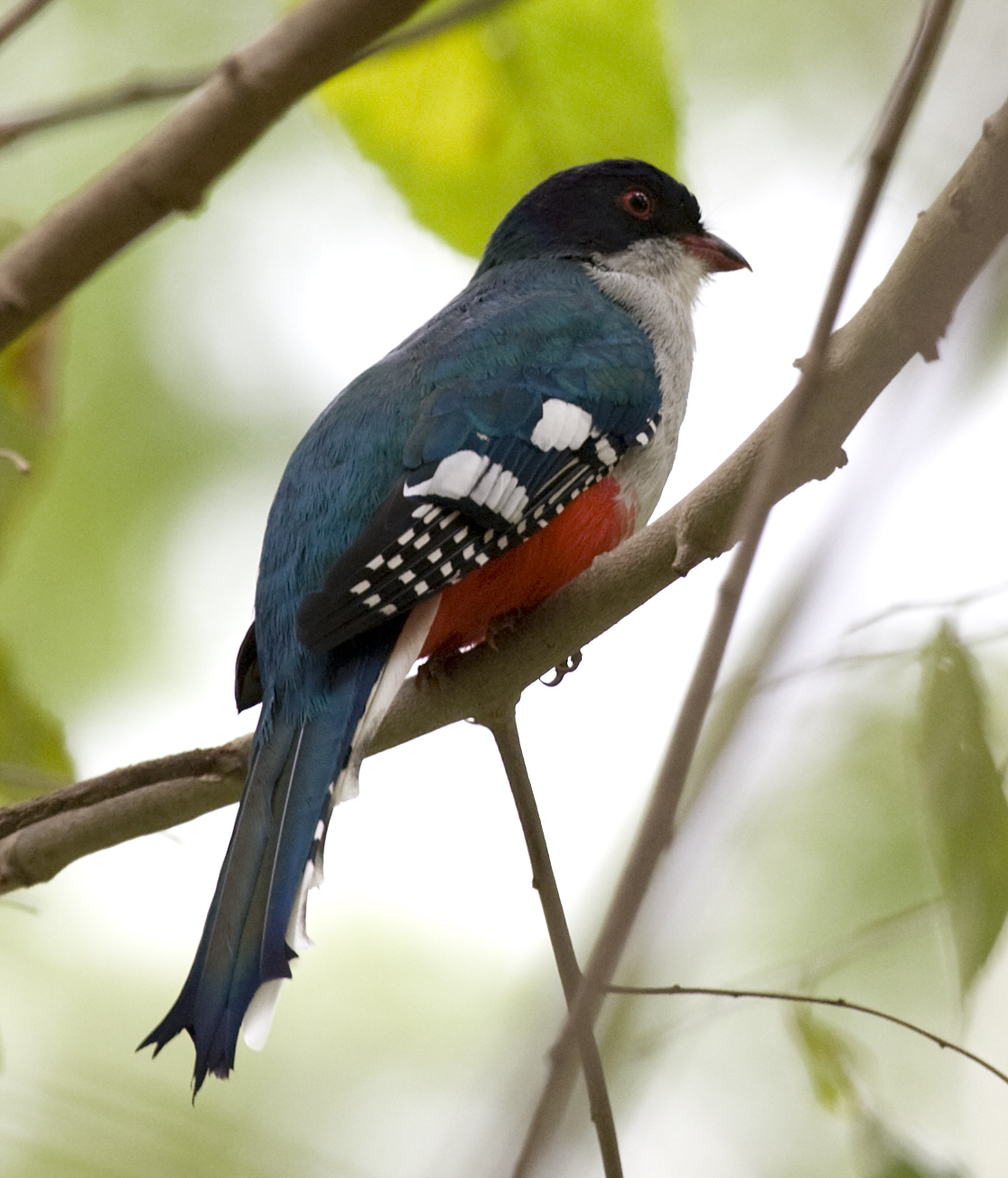
The Cuban trogon is the island's national bird. Its white, red and blue feathers match those of the Cuban flag.

Cuba contains six terrestrial ecoregions: Cuban moist forests, Cuban dry forests, Cuban pine forests, Cuban wetlands, Cuban cactus scrub, and Greater Antilles mangroves. It had a 2019 Forest Landscape Integrity Index mean score of 5.4/10, ranking it 102nd globally out of 172 countries.

Cuba signed the Convention on Biological Diversity (CBD) in 1992. A National Biodiversity Strategy and Action Plan was submitted in 2008. The report contains a detailed breakdown of the numbers of species recorded from Cuba, the main groups being: animals (17,801 species), bacteria (270), chromista (707), fungi, including lichen-forming species (5,844), plants (9,107) and protozoa (1,440).

The native bee hummingbird or zunzuncito is the world's smallest known bird, with a length of 55 mm (2 1/8 in). The Cuban trogon or tocororo is the national bird of Cuba and an endemic species. Other endemic species are the Cuban crocodile, Cuban hutia, Cuban solenodon, Cuban gar, Cuban boa, and Polymita picta. Hedychium coronarium, named mariposa in Cuba, is the national flower.

== Government and politics ==
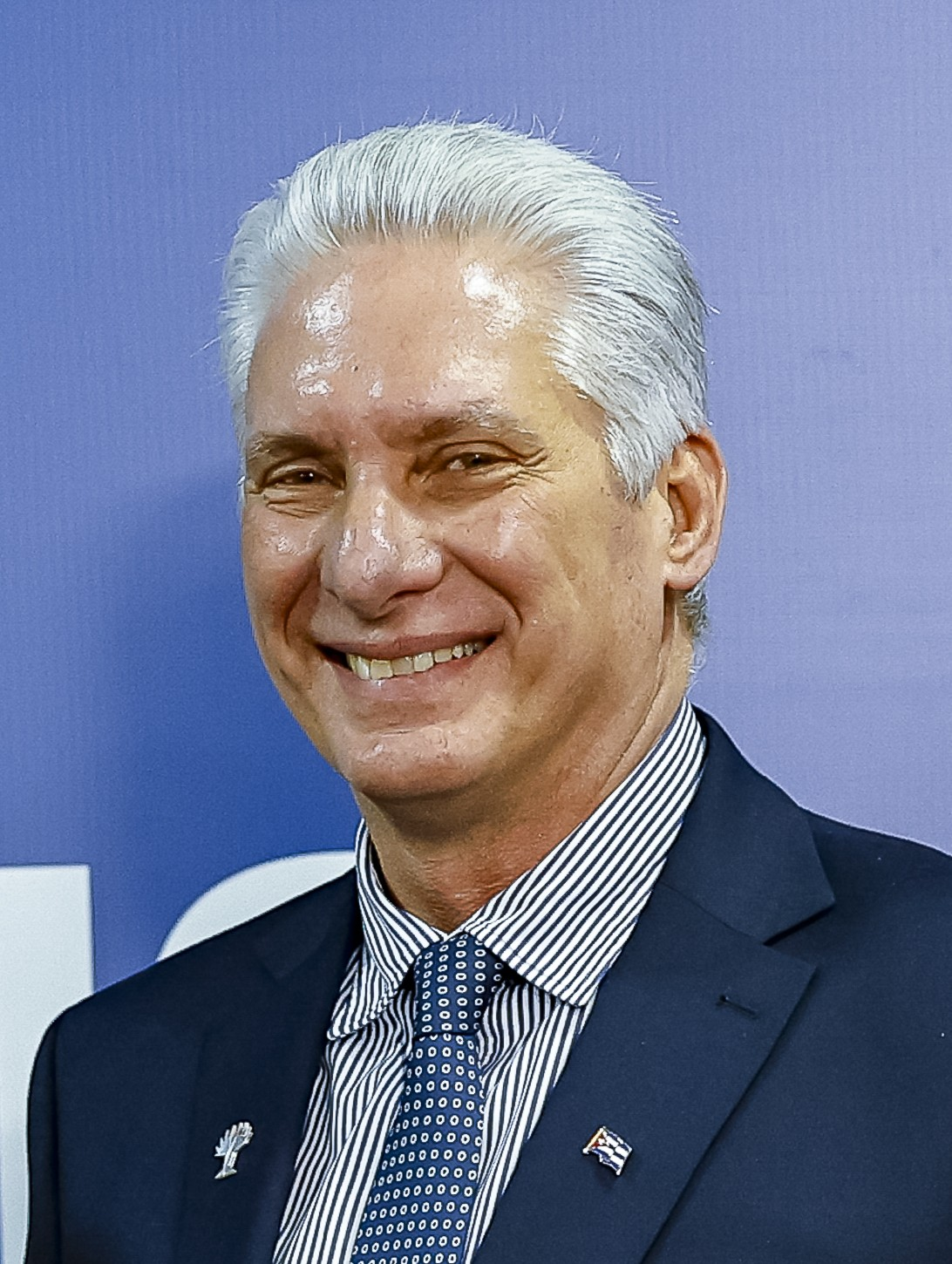
Miguel Díaz-Canel
First Secretary of the Communist Party and President

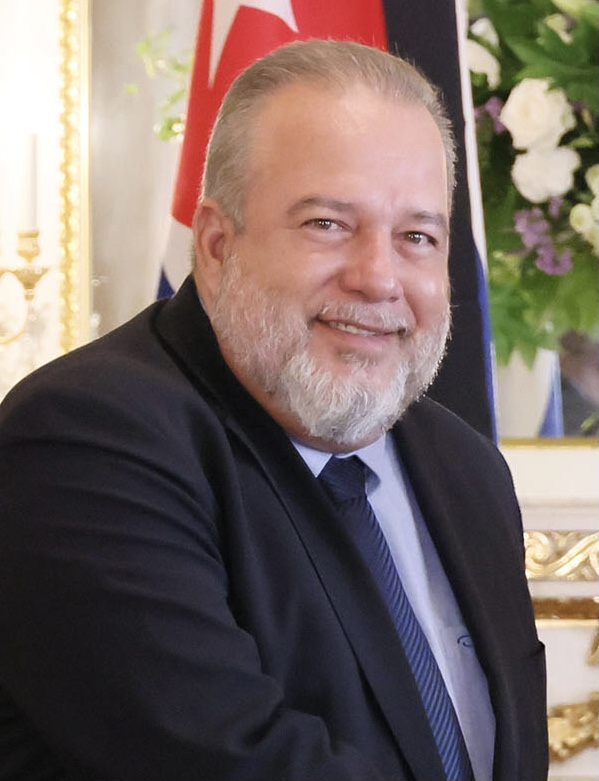
Manuel Marrero Cruz
Prime Minister

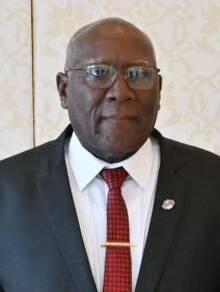
Salvador Valdés Mesa
Vice President

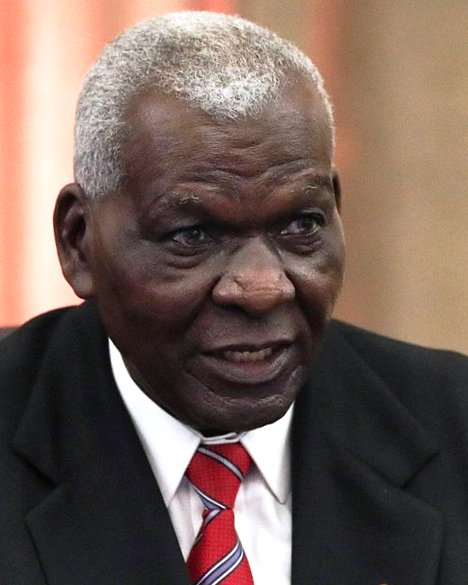
Esteban Lazo Hernández
President of the National Assembly

The Republic of Cuba is a unitary one-party socialist state that adheres to the ideology of Marxism–Leninism. The Constitution of 1976, which defines Cuba as a socialist republic, was amended in 1992 and 2002, and is "guided by the ideas of José Martí and the political and social ideas of Marx, Engels and Lenin". The constitution describes the Communist Party of Cuba as the "leading force of society and of the state". The political system reflects the Marxist–Leninist concept of democratic centralism.

The First Secretary of the Communist Party of Cuba is the most senior position in the one-party state. The First Secretary leads the Politburo and the Secretariat, making the office holder the most powerful person in government. Members of both councils are elected by the National Assembly of People's Power. The President of Cuba, who is elected by the Assembly, serves for five years and since the ratification of the 2019 Constitution, there is a limit of two consecutive five-year terms. The People's Supreme Court serves as the highest judicial branch of government. It is also the court of last resort for all appeals against the decisions of provincial courts.

Cuba's national legislature, the National Assembly of People's Power (Asamblea Nacional de Poder Popular), is the supreme state organ of power; 470 members serve five-year terms. The assembly meets twice a year; between sessions legislative power is held by the 31 member Council of Ministers. Candidates for the Assembly are approved by public referendum. All Cuban citizens over 16 who have not been convicted of a criminal offense can vote. Article 131 of the constitution states that voting shall be "through free, equal and secret vote". Article 136 states: "In order for deputies or delegates to be considered elected they must get more than half the number of valid votes cast in the electoral districts".

Elections in Cuba are not considered democratic. In elections for the National Assembly of People's Power there is only one candidate for each seat, which prevents electoral competition. No political party is permitted to nominate candidates or campaign on the island. Candidates are nominated by committees that are firmly controlled by the Communist Party. Voters can select individual candidates on their ballot, select every candidate, or leave every question blank, with no option to vote against candidates.

The Communist Party of Cuba holds Congress of the Communist Party of Cuba meetings once in around 5 years since 1975. In 2011, the party stated that there were 800,000 members. Party representatives generally constitute at least half of the Councils of state and the National Assembly. The remaining positions are filled by candidates nominally without party affiliation. Other political parties campaign and raise finances internationally, while activity by political opposition groups is minimal.

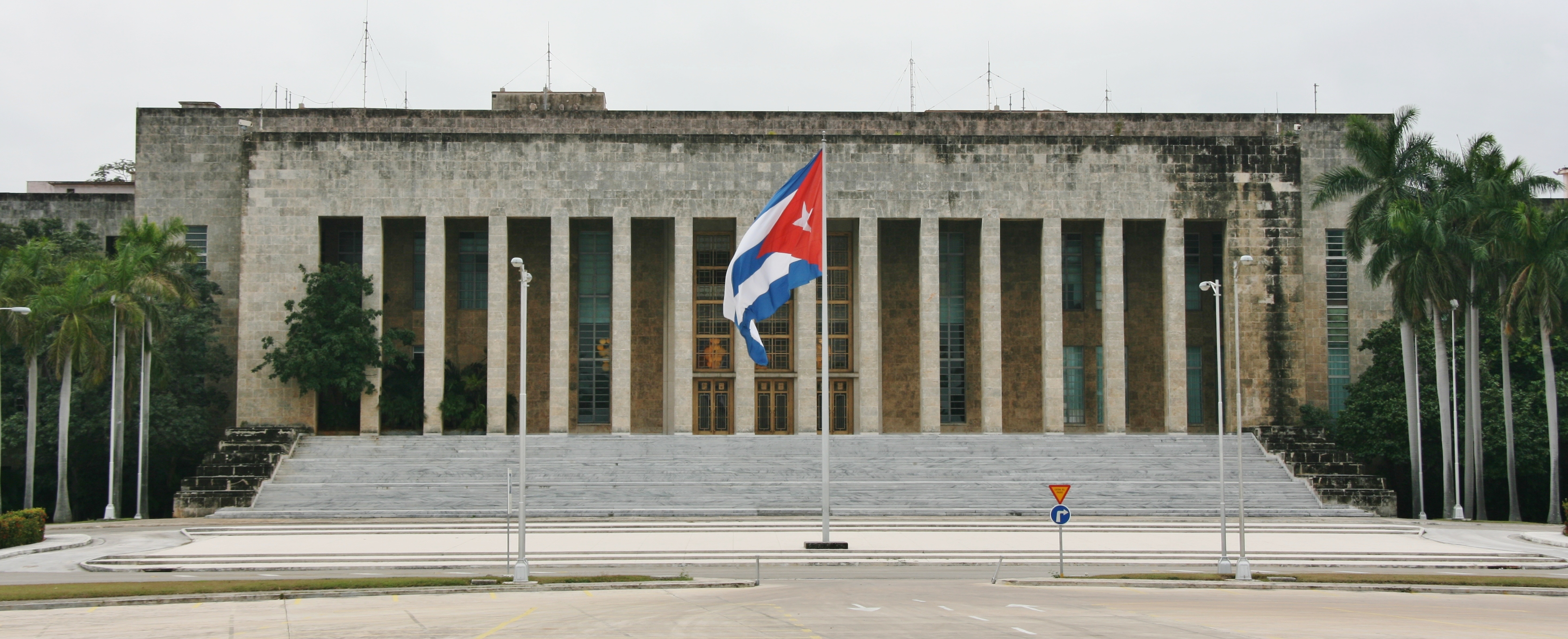
The headquarters of the Communist Party

According to International Institute for Democracy and Electoral Assistance, Cuba performs poorly on overall democratic measures. Cuba is considered an authoritarian regime according to The Economist's Democracy Index, Freedom in the World reports, and V-Dem Democracy Indices.

Miguel Díaz-Canel was elected president on 18 April 2018 after the resignation of Raúl Castro. On 19 April 2021, Díaz-Canel became First Secretary of the Communist Party. He is the first non-Castro to be in such top position since the Cuban Revolution of 1959.

=== Administrative divisions ===
The country is subdivided into 15 provinces and one special municipality (Isla de la Juventud). These were formerly part of six larger historical provinces: Pinar del Río, Habana, Matanzas, Las Villas, Camagüey and Oriente. The present subdivisions closely resemble those of the Spanish military provinces during the Cuban Wars of Independence, when the most troublesome areas were subdivided. The provinces are divided into municipalities.

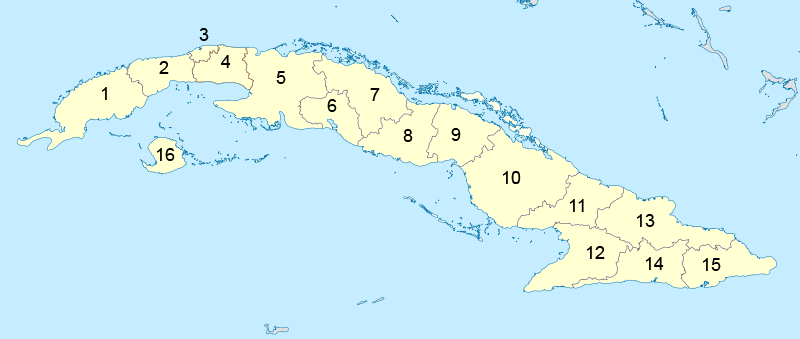
Provinces of Cuba: 1. Pinar del Río; 2. Artemisa; 3. Havana; 4. Mayabeque; 5. Matanzas; 6. Cienfuegos; 7. Villa Clara; 8. Sancti Spíritus; 9. Ciego de Ávila; 10. Camagüey; 11. Las Tunas; 12. Granma; 13. Holguín; 14. Santiago de Cuba; 15. Guantánamo; 16. Isla de la Juventud

=== Foreign relations ===
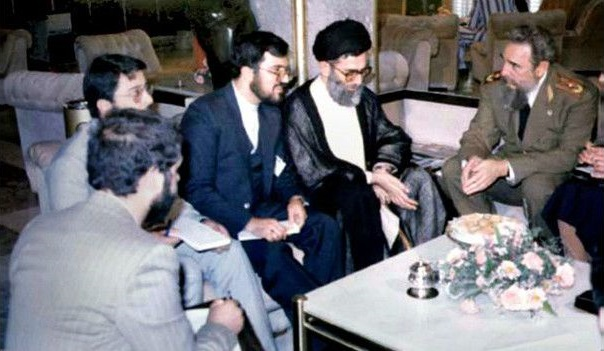
Fidel Castro and Ali Khamenei at a meeting of the Non-Aligned Movement in Zimbabwe, 3 September 1986

Cuba is a founding member of the United Nations, G77, Non-Aligned Movement, Organisation of African, Caribbean and Pacific States, ALBA, and Organization of American States. Cuba has conducted a foreign policy that is uncharacteristic of such a minor, developing country. Under Castro, Cuba was heavily involved in wars in Africa, Central America and Asia. Cuba supported Algeria in 1961–1965 and sent tens of thousands of troops to Angola during the Angolan Civil War. Other countries that featured Cuban involvement include Ethiopia, Guinea, Guinea-Bissau, Mozambique, and Yemen. Lesser known actions include the 1959 missions to the Dominican Republic. The expedition failed, but a prominent monument to its members was erected in their memory in Santo Domingo by the Dominican government, and they feature prominently at the country's Memorial Museum of the Resistance.

In 2008, the European Union and Cuba agreed to resume full relations and cooperation activities. Cuba is a founding member of the Bolivarian Alliance for the Americas. Tens of thousands of Cuban medical personnel have worked abroad, with as many as 30,000 doctors in Venezuela alone via the two countries' oil-for-doctors programme.

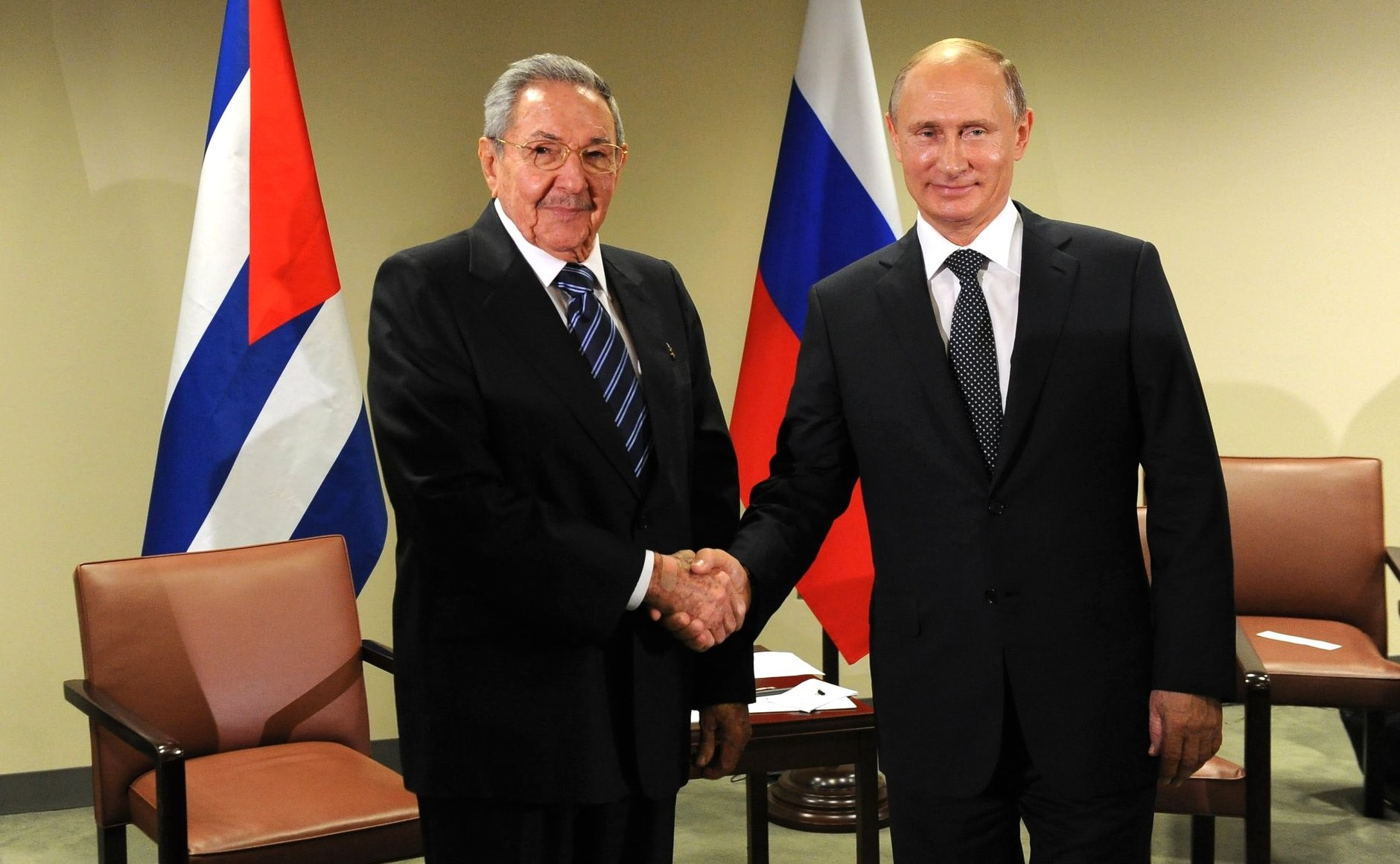
Raúl Castro with Russian President Vladimir Putin in New York City, 28 September 2015

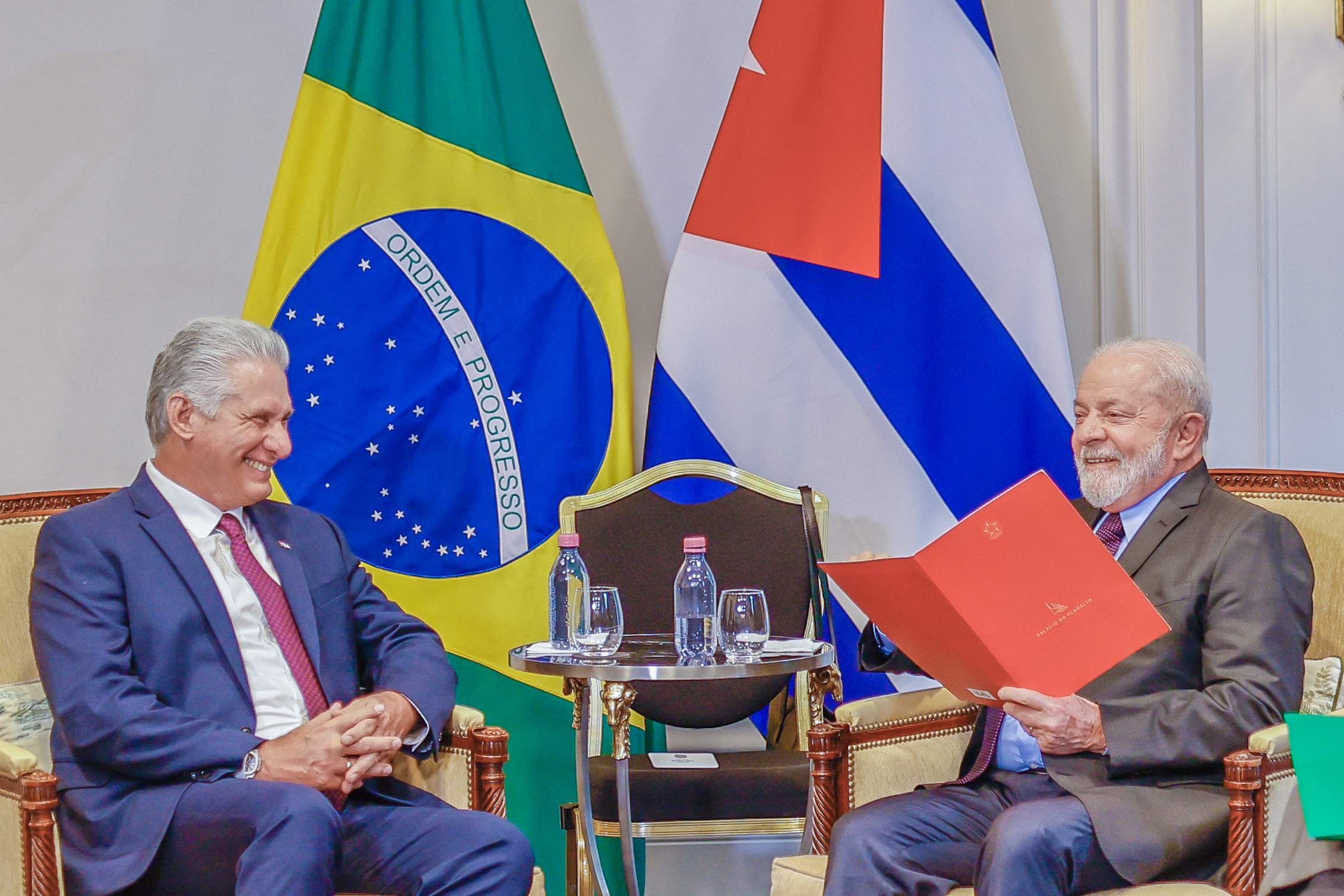
Cuban leader Miguel Díaz-Canel with Brazilian President Luiz Inácio Lula da Silva in Paris, France, 22 June 2023

In the wake of the Russian invasion of Ukraine and the ongoing international isolation of Russia, Cuba emerged as one of the few countries that maintained friendly relations with the Russian Federation. Diaz-Canel visited Vladimir Putin in Moscow in November 2022, where the two leaders opened a monument of Fidel Castro, as well as speaking out against U.S. sanctions against Russia and Cuba.

==== Embargo by the United States (1960–present) ====
Since 1960, the U.S. embargo on Cuba stands as one of the longest-running trade and economic measures in bilateral relations history, having endured for over six decades. This action was initiated in response to a wave of nationalizations that impacted American properties valued at over US$1 billion. U.S. American diplomat Lester D. Mallory wrote an internal memo on 6 April 1960, arguing in favor of an embargo: "The only foreseeable means of alienating internal support is through disenchantment and disaffection based on economic dissatisfaction and hardship. [...] to decrease monetary and real wages, to bring about hunger, desperation and overthrow of government." President Dwight Eisenhower instated an embargo that prohibited all exports to Cuba, with the exception of medicines and certain foods. This measure was intensified in 1962 under the administration of John F. Kennedy, extending the restrictions to Cuban imports, based on the Foreign Assistance Act approved by Congress in 1961. During the Missile Crisis in 1962, the United States even imposed a naval blockade on Cuba, but this was lifted following the resolution of the crisis. The embargo, however, remained in place and has been modified on several occasions over the years.

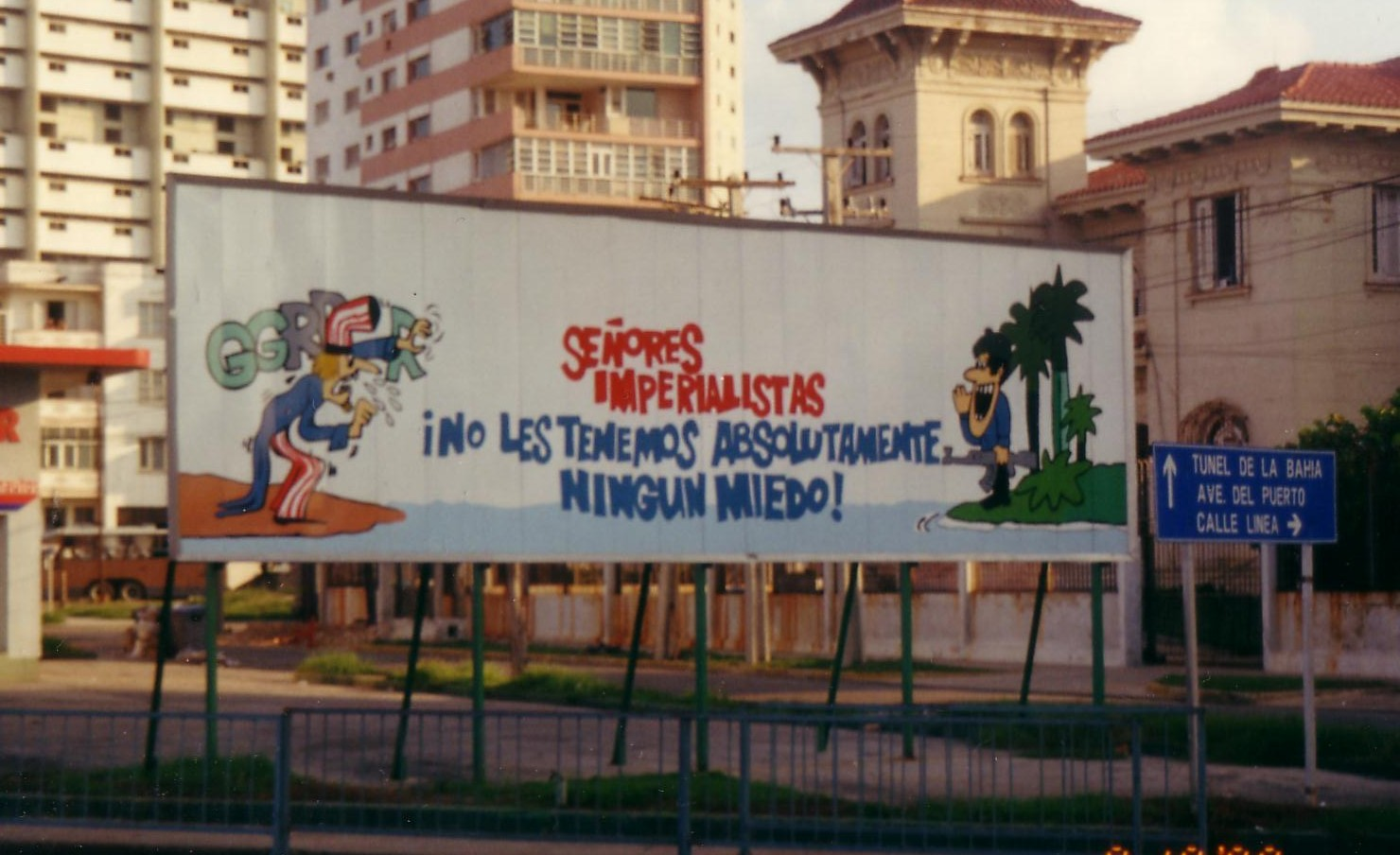
Propaganda sign in front of the United States Interests Section in Havana

The Cuban Democracy Act of 1992 states that sanctions will continue "so long as it continues to refuse to move toward democratization and greater respect for human rights". The UN General Assembly has passed a resolution every year since 1992 condemning the embargo and stating that it violates the Charter of the United Nations and international law. Cuba considers the embargo a human rights violation. The impact and effectiveness of the embargo have been subjects of intense debate. While some argue it has been "extraordinarily porous" and is not the primary cause of Cuba's economic hardships, others see it as a pressure mechanism aimed at driving change in the Cuban government. According to Arturo Lopez Levy, a professor of international relations, it would be more appropriate to refer to the measure as a "blockade" or "siege", as it goes beyond mere trade restrictions. Other critics of the Cuban government argue that the embargo has been used by the government as an excuse to justify its own economic and political shortcomings.

In 1996, the United States passed the Cuban Liberty and Democratic Solidarity Act, better known as the Helms–Burton Act, which strengthens and continues the United States embargo against Cuba. (Note: Roy's study was described as "systematic and fair" by Jorge Domínguez.) In 2009, United States president Barack Obama stated "the United States seeks a new beginning with Cuba", and he reversed the Bush Administration's prohibition on travel and remittances by Cuban-Americans from the United States to Cuba. In 2014 an agreement between the United States and Cuba, popularly called the "Cuban thaw", brokered in part by Canada and Pope Francis, began the process of restoring international relations between the two countries. They agreed to release political prisoners, and in 2015 the United States opened an embassy in Havana. and reestablished diplomatic relations. In 2015 Obama announced he would remove Cuba from the American government's list of nations that sponsor terrorism, which Cuba reportedly welcomed as "fair". On 17 September 2017, the United States considered closing its Cuban embassy following mysterious medical symptoms experienced by its staff.

The diplomatic relations set in place by Obama were later reversed by the Trump administration, which enacted new rules and re-enforced the business and travel restrictions which were loosened by the Obama administration. These sanctions were inherited and strengthened by the Biden administration.

=== Military ===
As of 2018, Cuba spent about US$91.8 million on its armed forces or 2.9% of its GDP. In 1985, Cuba devoted more than 10% of its GDP to military expenditures. During the Cold War, Cuba built up the largest per capita armed forces in Latin America, funded and equipped by the Soviet Union. From 1975 until the late 1980s, Soviet military assistance enabled Cuba to upgrade its military capabilities. After the loss of Soviet subsidies, Cuba scaled down the numbers of military personnel, from 235,000 in 1994 to about 49,000 in 2021.

In 2017, Cuba signed the UN treaty on the Prohibition of Nuclear Weapons. Since signing a defense pact with Belarus in January 2024, Cuba has upgraded its S-125 Pechora air defense systems with Belarusian support, but it does not have a modern networked air defense system.

According to the Global Peace Index, Cuba has a medium state of peace ranked 102 out of 163 countries.

Cuba is considered a military dictatorship in the Democracy-Dictatorship Index and has been described as "a militarized society" with the armed forces having long been the most powerful institution in the country.

=== Law enforcement ===
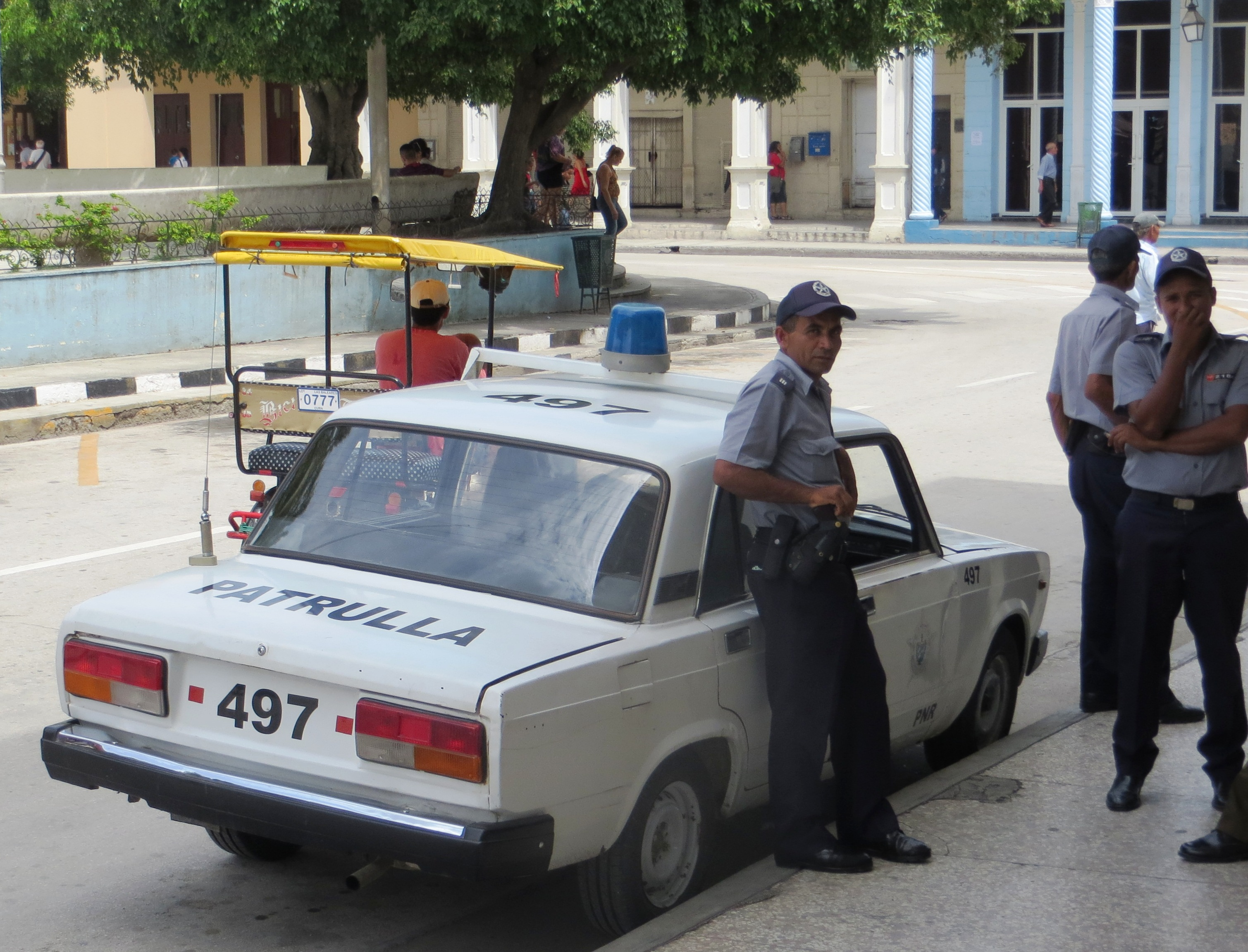
A Lada Riva police car in Holguín

All law enforcement agencies are maintained under Cuba's Ministry of the Interior, which is supervised by the Revolutionary Armed Forces. The Intelligence Directorate conducts intelligence operations and maintains close ties with the Russian Federal Security Service. The US Justice Department considers Cuba a significant counterintelligence threat.

=== Censorship ===
The unconditional release of all political prisoners was called for by the EU. In July 2010, the unofficial Cuban Human Rights Commission said there were 167 political prisoners in Cuba, a fall from 201 at the start of the year. The head of the commission stated that long prison sentences were being replaced by harassment and intimidation. Cuba was ranked 19th by the number of imprisoned journalists of any nation in 2021 according to various sources, including the Committee to Protect Journalists and Human Rights Watch. Cuba ranks 171st out of 180 on the 2020 World Press Freedom Index.

The Committees for the Defense of the Revolution surveil their neighborhoods for "counter-revolutionary" activity. Membership is not selective, but leading members are approved by the Cuban Communist Party.

=== Identity politics ===
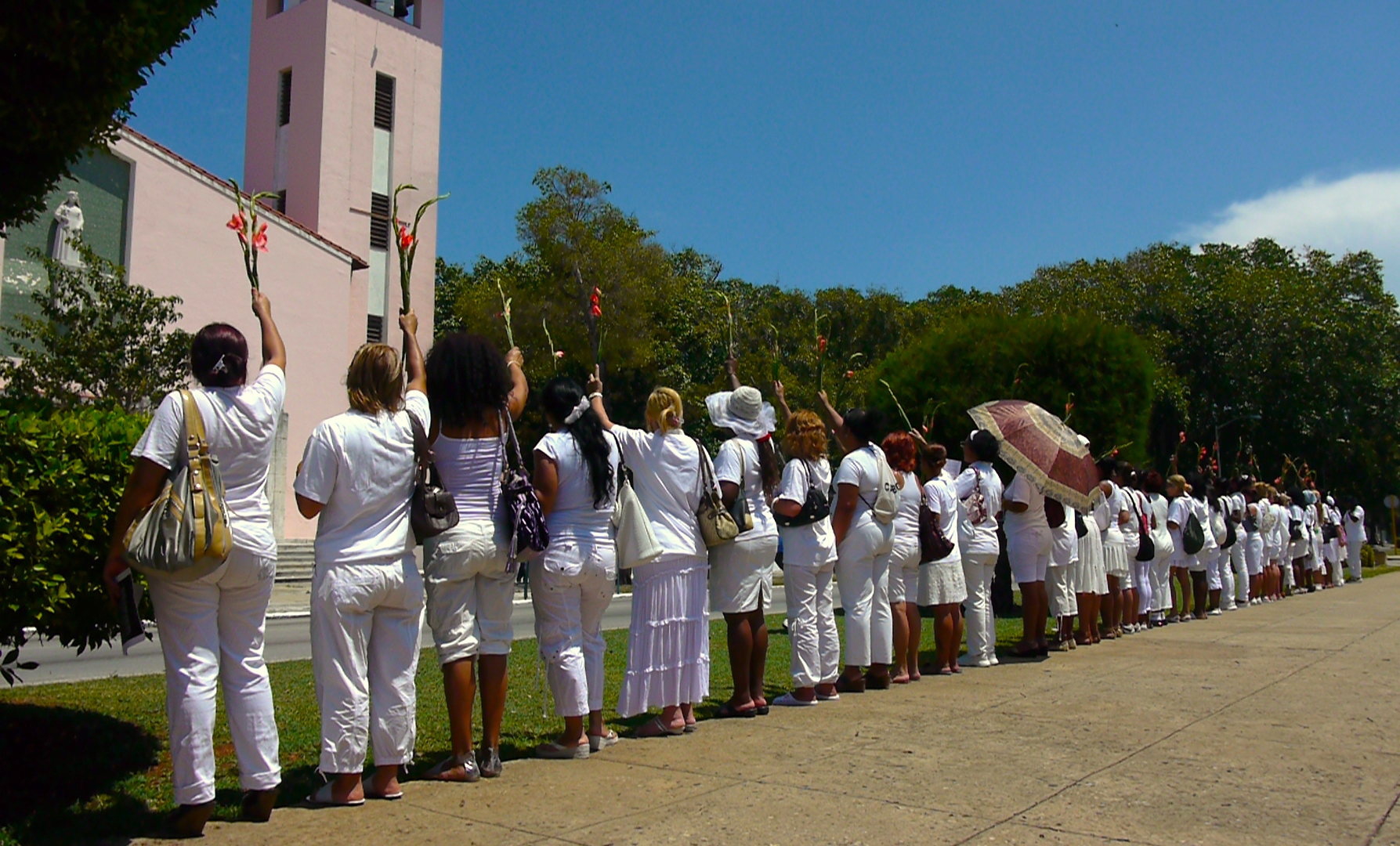
Ladies in White demonstration in Havana (April 2012)

Cuba performs in the top 25% of nations in gender equality. In 2022 Cuba approved a referendum which amended the Family Code to legalise same-sex marriage and allow surrogate pregnancy and same-sex adoption. Gender reassignment surgery and transgender hormone therapy are provided free of charge under the national healthcare system. The government supported the proposed changes, but conservatives and parts of the opposition opposed them. Official policies of the government from 1959 until the 1990s were hostile towards homosexuality, with the LGBT community marginalized on the basis of heteronormativity, traditional gender roles, and strict criteria for moralism.

== Economy ==
Historical GDP per capita development

The Cuban state asserts its adherence to socialist principles in organizing its largely state-controlled planned economy. Most of the means of production are owned and run by the government, and most of the labor force is employed by the state. Recent years have seen a trend toward more private sector employment. By 2006, public sector employment was 78% and private sector 22%, compared to 91.8% to 8.2% in 1981. Government spending is 78.1% of GDP. Since the early 2010s, following the initial market reforms, it has become popular to describe the economy as being, or moving toward, market socialism. Any firm that hires a Cuban must pay the Cuban government, which in turn pays the employee in Cuban pesos (CUP). After a reform in 2021, the minimum monthly wage is about 2100 CUP (US$81), and the median monthly wage is about 4000 CUP (US$155). According to Carmelo Mesa-Lago, there is widespread consensus that the policies of the revolutionary government decreased poverty until the end of the Cold War. Every Cuban household has a ration book (known as libreta) entitling it to a monthly supply of food and other staples, which are provided at nominal cost. Cuba’s economy is heavily impacted by the US trade embargo, which began in the 1960s.

According to the Havana Consulting Group, in 2014, remittances to Cuba were more than US$3 billion, the seventh highest in Latin America. In 2019, remittances had grown to US$6,616 million, but dropped down to US$1,967 million in 2020, due to the COVID-19 pandemic. The pandemic devastated Cuba's tourist industry, which along with a tightening of U.S. sanctions, led to large increase in emigration among younger working-age Cubans. It has been described as a crisis that is "threatening the stability" of Cuba, which "already has one of the hemisphere's oldest populations". According to a controversial 2023 report by the Cuban Observatory of Human Rights, 88% of Cuban citizens live in extreme poverty. The report states that Cubans were concerned about food security and the difficulty in acquiring basic goods.

According to the World Bank, Cuba's GDP per capita was $9,500 as of 2020. But according to the CIA World Factbook, it was $12,300 as of 2016. The United Nations Development Programme gave Cuba a Human Development Index of 0.764 in 2021. The same United Nations agency estimated the country's Multidimensional Poverty Index of 0.003 in 2023.

In 2005, Cuba had exports of US$2.4 billion, ranking 114 of 226 world countries, and imports of US$6.9 billion, ranking 87 of 226 countries. Its major export partners are Canada 17.7%, China 16.9%, Venezuela 12.5%, Netherlands 9%, and Spain 5.9% (2012). Major exports include sugar, nickel, tobacco, fish, medical products, citrus fruits, and coffee; imports include food, fuel, clothing, and machinery. Cuba presently holds debt in an amount estimated at $13 billion, approximately 38% of GDP. Cuba's prior 35% supply of the world's export market for sugar has declined to 10% due to a variety of factors, including a global sugar commodity price drop that made Cuba less competitive on world markets. It was announced in 2008 that wage caps would be abandoned to improve the nation's productivity.

Cuba's leadership has called for reforms in the country's agricultural system. In 2008, Raúl Castro began enacting agrarian reforms to boost food production, as at that time 80% of food was imported. The reforms aim to expand land use and increase efficiency. Venezuela supplies Cuba with an estimated 110,000 barrels (17,000 m^{3}) of oil per day in exchange for money and the services of some 44,000 Cubans, most of them medical personnel, in Venezuela.

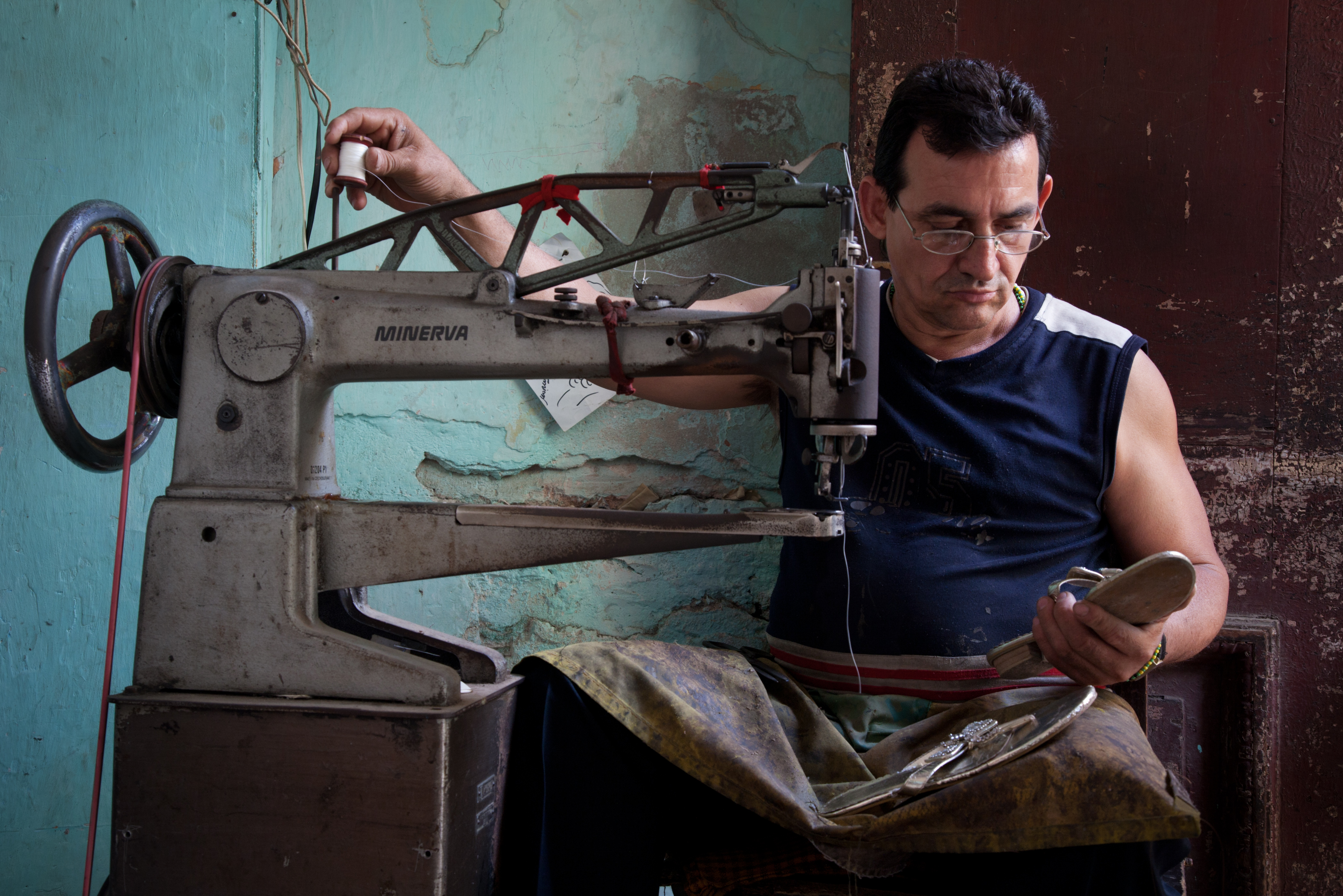
Cubans are now permitted to own small businesses in certain sectors.

In 2010, Cubans were allowed to build their own houses. According to Raúl Castro, they could now improve their houses, but the government would not endorse these new houses or improvements. There is virtually no homelessness in Cuba, and 85% of Cubans own their homes and pay no property taxes or mortgage interest.

On 2 August 2011, The New York Times reported that Cuba reaffirmed its intent to legalize "buying and selling" of private property before the year's end. According to experts, the private sale of property could "transform Cuba more than any of the economic reforms announced by Cuban leader Raúl Castro's government". It would cut more than one million state jobs, including party bureaucrats who resist the changes. The reforms created what some call "New Cuban Economy". In October 2013, Raúl said he intended to merge the two currencies, which eventually occurred in 2021.

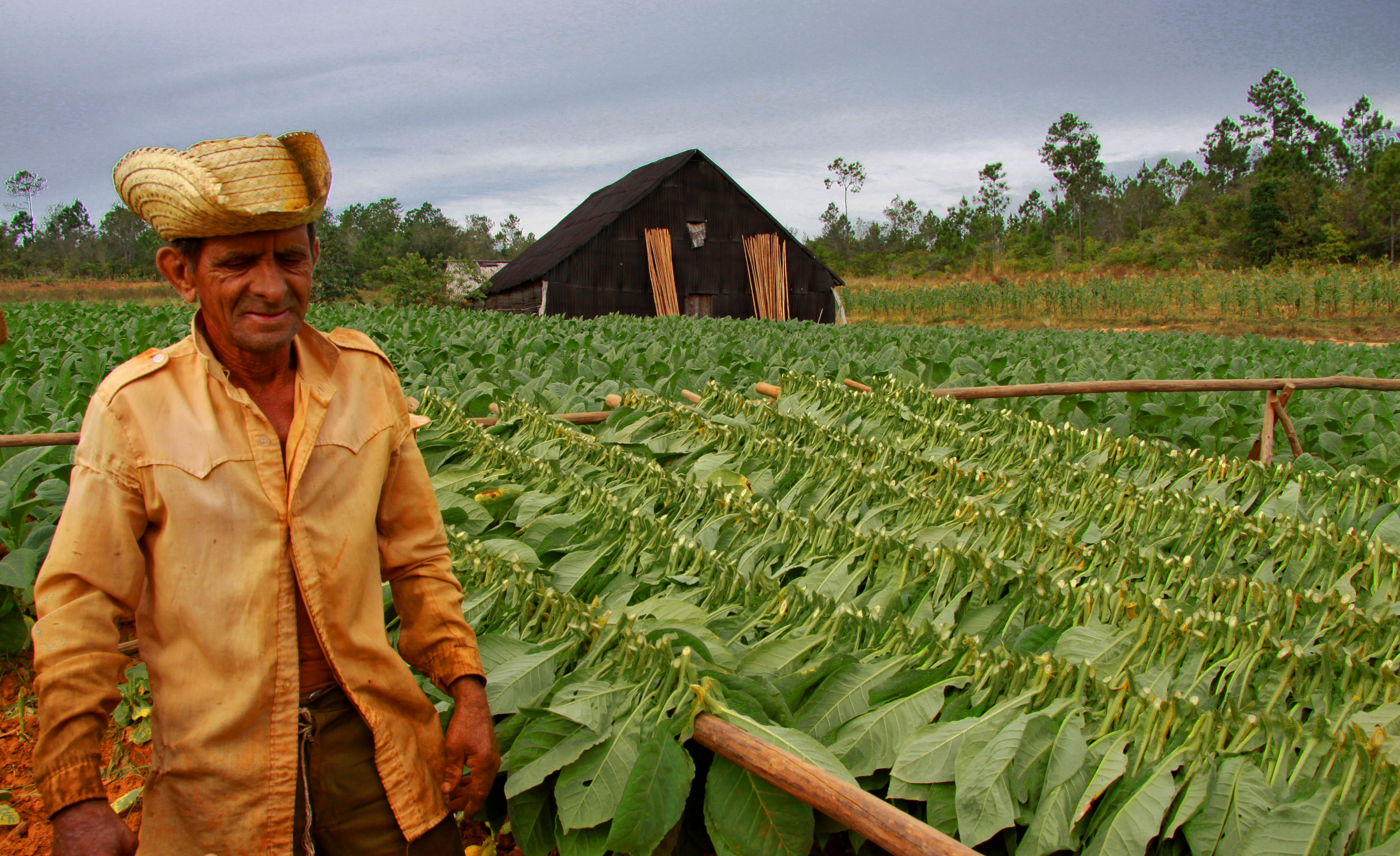
Tobacco fields in Viñales

In 2016, the Miami Herald wrote, "... about 27 percent of Cubans earn under $50 per month; 34 percent earn the equivalent of $50 to $100 per month; and 20 percent earn $101 to $200. Twelve percent reported earning $201 to $500 a month; and almost 4 percent said their monthly earnings topped $500, including 1.5 percent who said they earned more than $1,000."

In May 2019, Cuba imposed rationing of staples such as chicken, eggs, rice, beans, soap and other basic goods. (Some two-thirds of food in the country is imported.) A spokesperson blamed the increased U.S. trade embargo although economists believe that an equally important problem is the massive decline of aid from Venezuela and the failure of Cuba's state-run oil company which had subsidized fuel costs.

In June 2019, the government announced an increase in public sector wages of about 300%, specifically for teachers and health personnel. In October, the government allowed stores to purchase house equipment and similar items, using international currency, and send it to Cuba by emigration. The leaders of the government recognized that the new measures were unpopular but necessary to contain the capital flight to other countries as Panamá where Cuban citizens traveled and imported items to resell on the island. Other measures included allowing private companies to export and import, through state companies, resources to produce products and services in Cuba.

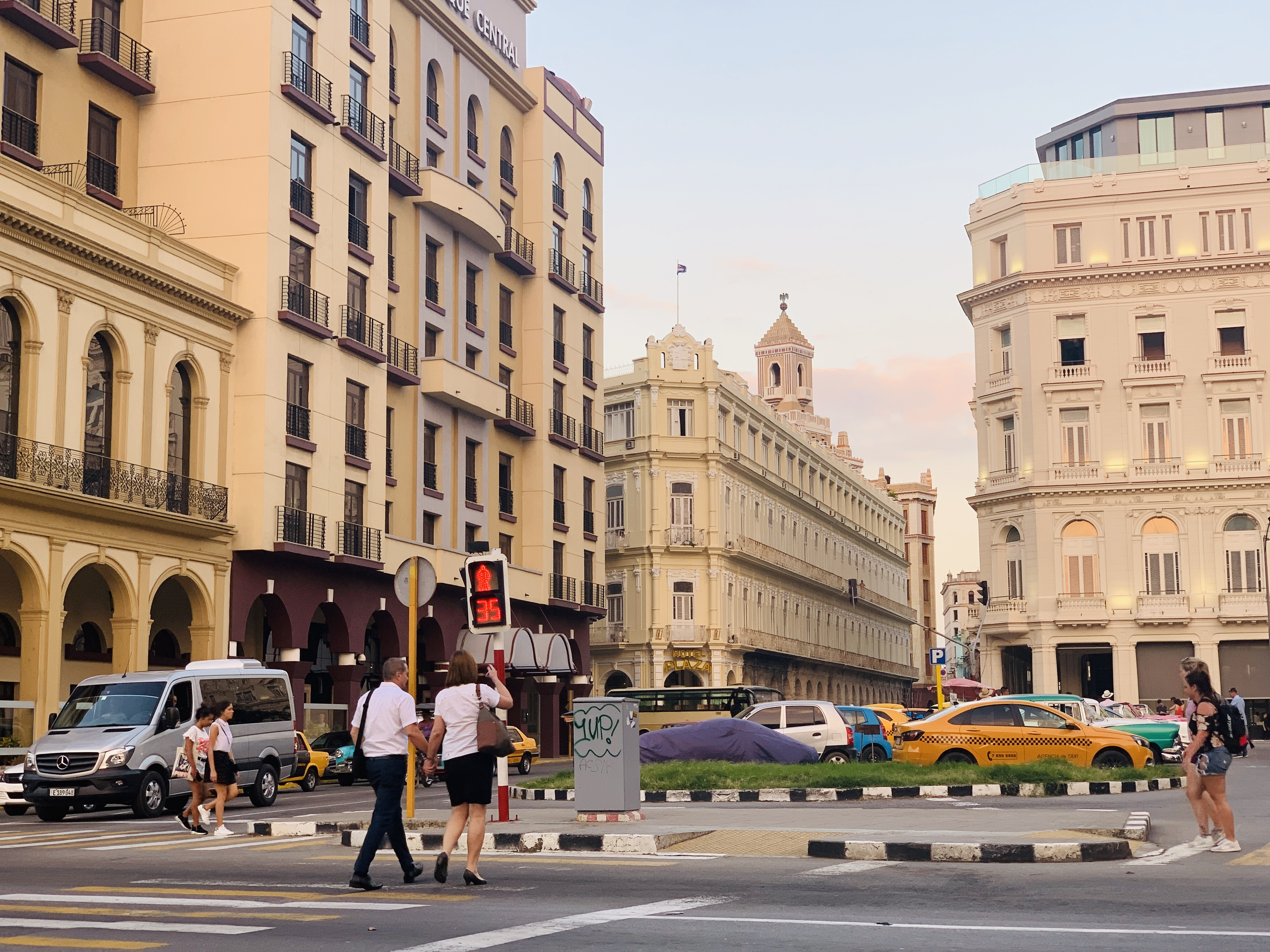
Hotel Parque Central in Havana

On 1 January 2021, Cuba's dual currency system was formally ended, and the convertible Cuban peso (CUC) was phased out, leaving the Cuban peso (CUP) as the country's sole currency unit. Cuban citizens had until June 2021 to exchange their CUCs. However, this devalued the Cuban peso and caused economic problems for people who had been previously paid in CUCs, particularly workers in the tourism industry. Also, in February, the government dictated new measures to the private sector, with prohibitions for only 124 activities, in areas like national security, health and educational services. The wages were increased again, between 4 and 9 times, for all the sectors. Also, new facilities were allowed to the state companies, with much more autonomy.

The first problem with the new reform, in terms of public opinion, were electricity prices, but that was amended quickly. Other measures corrected were in the prices for private farmers. In July 2020, Cuba opened new stores accepting only foreign currency while simultaneously eliminating a special tax on the U.S. dollar to combat an economic crisis arising initially due to economic sanctions imposed by the Trump administration, then later worsened by a lack of tourism during the coronavirus pandemic. Cooperatives will play a larger role in the emerging Cuban economy. The transfer of state-run businesses into cooperatives could result in 20 – 30 percent of Cuba's workers being actively involved in cooperatives. All state-run restaurants (over 8,000) will be converted to worker owned cooperatives, and by 2017 the Cuban government expects there to be approximately 10,000 cooperatives operating.

According to 2019 data, China stands as Cuba's main trading partner, followed by countries such as Spain, the Netherlands, Germany, and Cyprus. Cuba's main exports include tobacco, sugar, and alcoholic beverages, while it primarily imports chicken meat, wheat, corn, and condensed milk.

=== Resources ===
Cuba's natural resources include sugar, tobacco, fish, citrus fruits, coffee, beans, rice, potatoes, and livestock. Cuba's most important mineral resource is nickel, with 21% of total exports in 2011. The output of Cuba's nickel mines that year was 71,000 tons, approaching 4% of world production. As of 2013 its reserves were estimated at 5.5 million tons, over 7% of the world total. Sherritt International of Canada operates a large nickel mining facility in Moa. Cuba is also a major producer of refined cobalt, a by-product of nickel mining.

Oil exploration in 2005 by the US Geological Survey revealed that the North Cuba Basin could produce about 4.6 billion barrels (730,000,000 m^{3}) to 9.3 billion barrels (1.48×10^{9} m^{3}) of oil. In 2006, Cuba started to test-drill these locations for possible exploitation.

=== Tourism ===
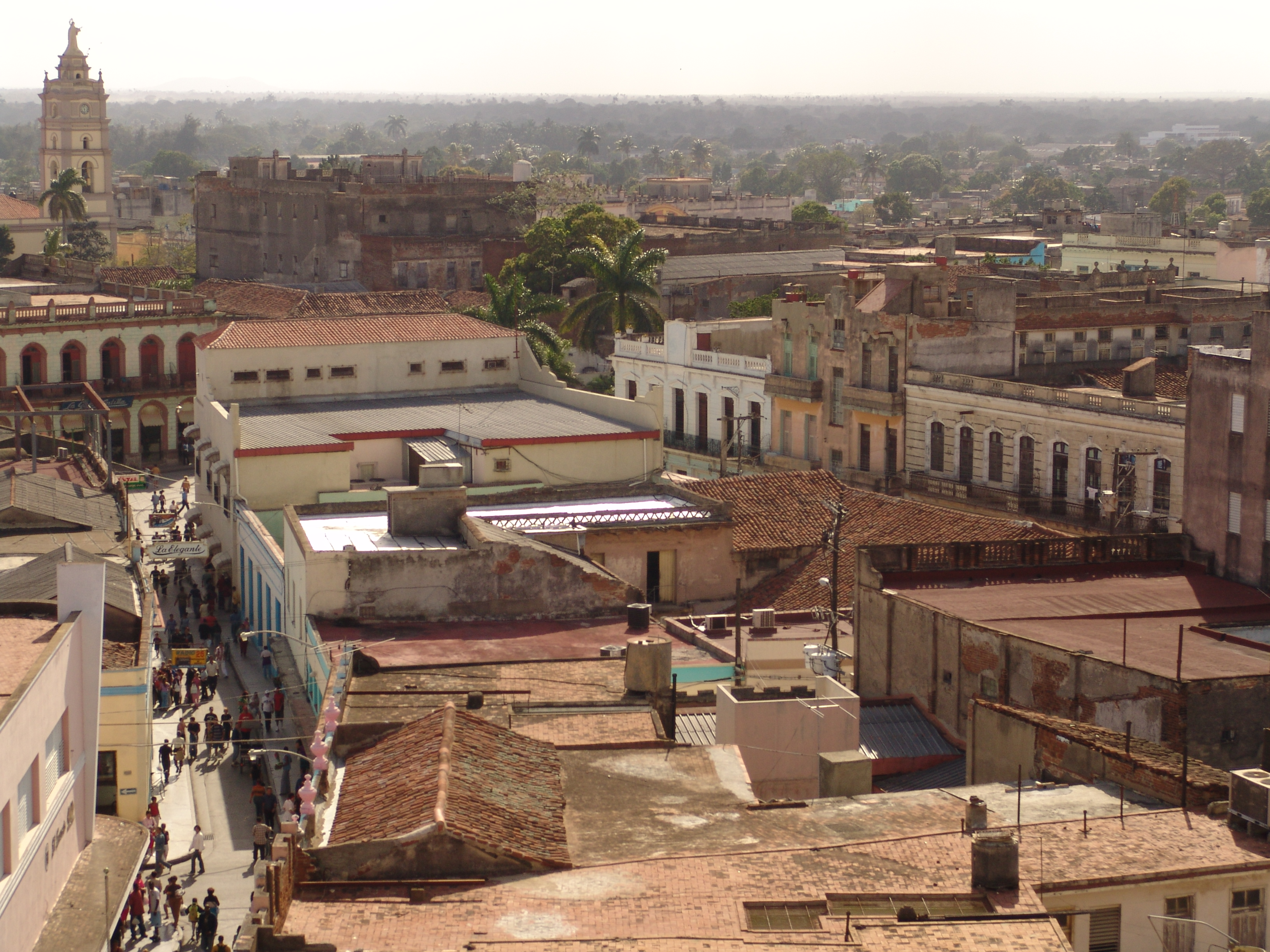
Historic Centre of Camagüey, a colonial city UNESCO World Heritage Site

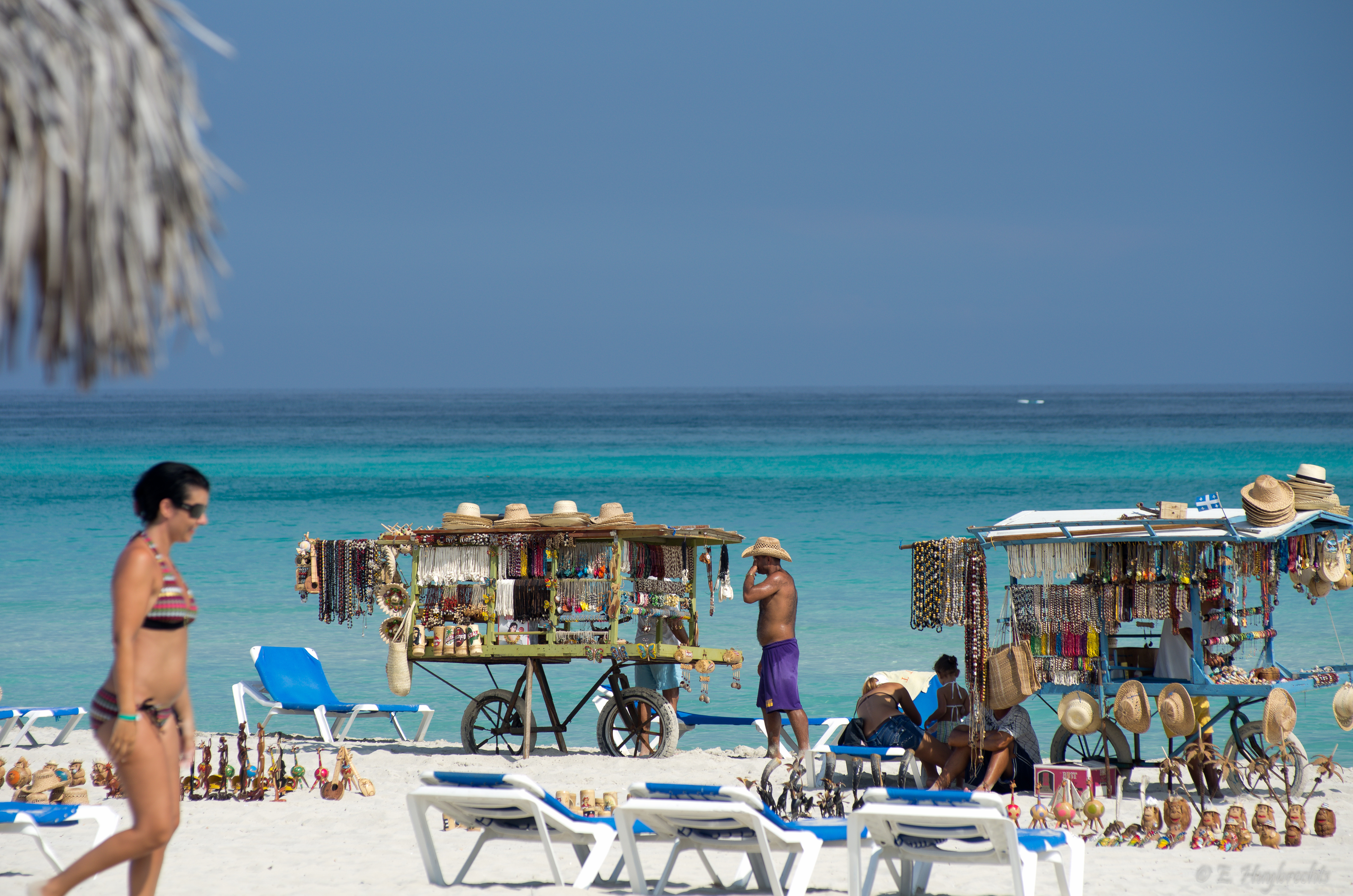
Varadero resort area

Tourism was initially restricted to enclave resorts where tourists would be segregated from Cuban society, referred to as "enclave tourism" and "tourism apartheid". Contact between foreign visitors and ordinary Cubans were de facto illegal between 1992 and 1997. The rapid growth of tourism during the Special Period had widespread social and economic repercussions in Cuba, and led to speculation about the emergence of a two-tier economy.

1.9 million tourists visited Cuba in 2003, predominantly from Canada and the European Union, generating revenue of US$2.1 billion. Cuba recorded 2,688,000 international tourists in 2011, the third-highest figure in the Caribbean (behind the Dominican Republic and Puerto Rico). American tourism was incredibly limited due to the Cuban Missile Crisis until 2016, when most restrictions were limited but some remained in place.

A study in 2018 indicated that Cuba has a potential for mountaineering activity, and that mountaineering could be a key contributor to tourism, along with other activities, e.g. biking, diving, caving. Promoting these resources could contribute to regional development, prosperity, and well-being.

The Cuban Justice minister downplays allegations of widespread sex tourism. According to a Government of Canada travel advice website, "Cuba is actively working to prevent child sex tourism, and a number of tourists, including Canadians, have been convicted of offenses related to the corruption of minors aged 16 and under. Prison sentences range from 7 to 25 years."

== Demographics ==
According to the official census of 2010, Cuba's population was 11,241,161, comprising 5,628,996 men and 5,612,165 women. Its birth rate (9.88 births per thousand population in 2006) is one of the lowest in the Western Hemisphere. Although the country's population has grown by about four million people since 1961, the rate of growth slowed during that period, and the population began to decline in 2006, due to the country's low fertility rate (1.43 children per woman) coupled with emigration.

=== Largest cities ===
Largest cities or towns in Cuba According to the 2018 Estimate
Rank	Name	Province	Pop.
1	Havana	La Habana	2,131,480
2	Santiago de Cuba	Santiago de Cuba	433,581
3	Camagüey	Camagüey	308,902
4	Holguín	Holguín	297,433
5	Santa Clara	Villa Clara	216,854
6	Guantánamo	Guantánamo	216,003
7	Las Tunas	Las Tunas	173,552
8	Bayamo	Granma	159,966
9	Cienfuegos	Cienfuegos	151,838
10	Pinar del Río	Pinar del Río	145,193

=== Ethnoracial groups ===
Ethnography of Cuba

Racial groups in Cuba (2012 census)
1. Whites (64.1%)
2. Mulattos (26.6%)
3. Blacks (9.26%)

Cuba's population descends primarily from three groups: Spanish settlers and immigrants—drawn largely from Andalusia, Galicia, Asturias, and the Canary Islands—sub-Saharan Africans transported to the island through the transatlantic slave trade, and the pre-Columbian indigenous peoples, chiefly the Taíno and Ciboney.

Afro-Cubans are descended primarily from the Yoruba people, Bantu people from the Congo basin, Kalabari tribe and Arará from the Dahomey, as well as several thousand North African refugees, most notably the Sahrawi Arabs of Western Sahara.

While Afro-Cubans and Cubans of Spanish descent have endured as distinct ethnocultural units, no equivalent indigenous-descended group survived the catastrophic demographic collapse of the sixteenth century; Taíno ancestry nonetheless persists in the Cuban population at the genetic level, as evidenced by mitochondrial DNA studies.

Cuba's population is therefore multiethnic, and intermarriage between these groups has been widespread across many centuries, producing a significant population of mixed ancestry—not as a product of recent admixture but of long-accumulated intergenerational intermarriage. Consequently, there is significant discrepancy between different estimates of the country's racial composition. A 2014 study based on ancestry-informative markers found that autosomal genetic ancestry in Cuba is 72% European, 20% African, and 8% Indigenous.

The 2002 Cuban census, in which respondents self-identified, found that 65.05% of the population was white, while the 2012 census recorded approximately 27% of Cubans as mestizo o mulato and just under 10% as negro (Black). The 2012 Cuban census recorded, on the same basis, that 64.1% of the population was white (blanco), 26.6% mestizo o mulato (mixed race), and 9.3% Black (negro). As with the 2002 census, these figures reflect self-perception rather than genetic ancestry or externally assigned classification, and have been widely contested by independent researchers who argue that they significantly under-report the Black and mixed-race population.

These figures also diverge markedly from estimates produced by applying the one-drop rule, the hypodescent convention historically specific to the United States, under which any traceable African ancestry classifies a person as Black. The Institute for Cuban and Cuban-American Studies at the University of Miami, using that framework, concluded that 62% of Cubans are Black. However, the one-drop rule does not reflect Cuban or broader Latin American racial classification. In Cuba, as across most of Latin America, people of mixed African and European ancestry—commonly designated mulato—have historically constituted and understood themselves as a distinct category, neither defined in opposition to Blackness nor in denial of it, but in acknowledgement of a mixed heritage that carries its own social and cultural meaning. The Cuban census formally recognises this through its separate mestizo o mulato classification. Applying a binary Black/white framework derived from U.S. legal and social history to Cuban racial self-identification therefore imposes a classificatory logic that Cuban society does not use and that systematically erases the identities of a substantial portion of the population. In light of these methodological divergences, the Minority Rights Group International has cautioned that "an objective assessment of the situation of Afro-Cubans remains problematic due to scant records and a paucity of systematic studies both pre- and post-revolution," and that estimates of the percentage of people of African descent in the Cuban population vary enormously, ranging from 33.9% to 62%.

Asians make up about 1% of the population and are largely of Chinese ancestry, followed by Japanese and Filipino. Many are descendants of farm laborers brought to the island by Spanish and American contractors during the 19th and early 20th century. The current recorded number of Cubans with Chinese ancestry is 114,240.

=== Migration ===
==== Immigration ====
Immigration and emigration have played a prominent part in Cuba's demographic profile. Between the 18th and early 20th century, large waves of Canarian, Catalan, Andalusian, Galician, and other Spanish people immigrated to Cuba. Between 1899 and 1930 alone, nearly one million Spaniards entered Cuba, although many eventually returned to Spain. Other prominent immigrant groups included French, Portuguese, Italian, Russian, Dutch, Greek, British, and Irish, as well as small number of descendants of U.S. citizens who arrived in Cuba in the late 19th and early 20th centuries. As of 2015, the foreign-born population in Cuba was 13,336 inhabitants per the World Bank data.

==== Emigration ====
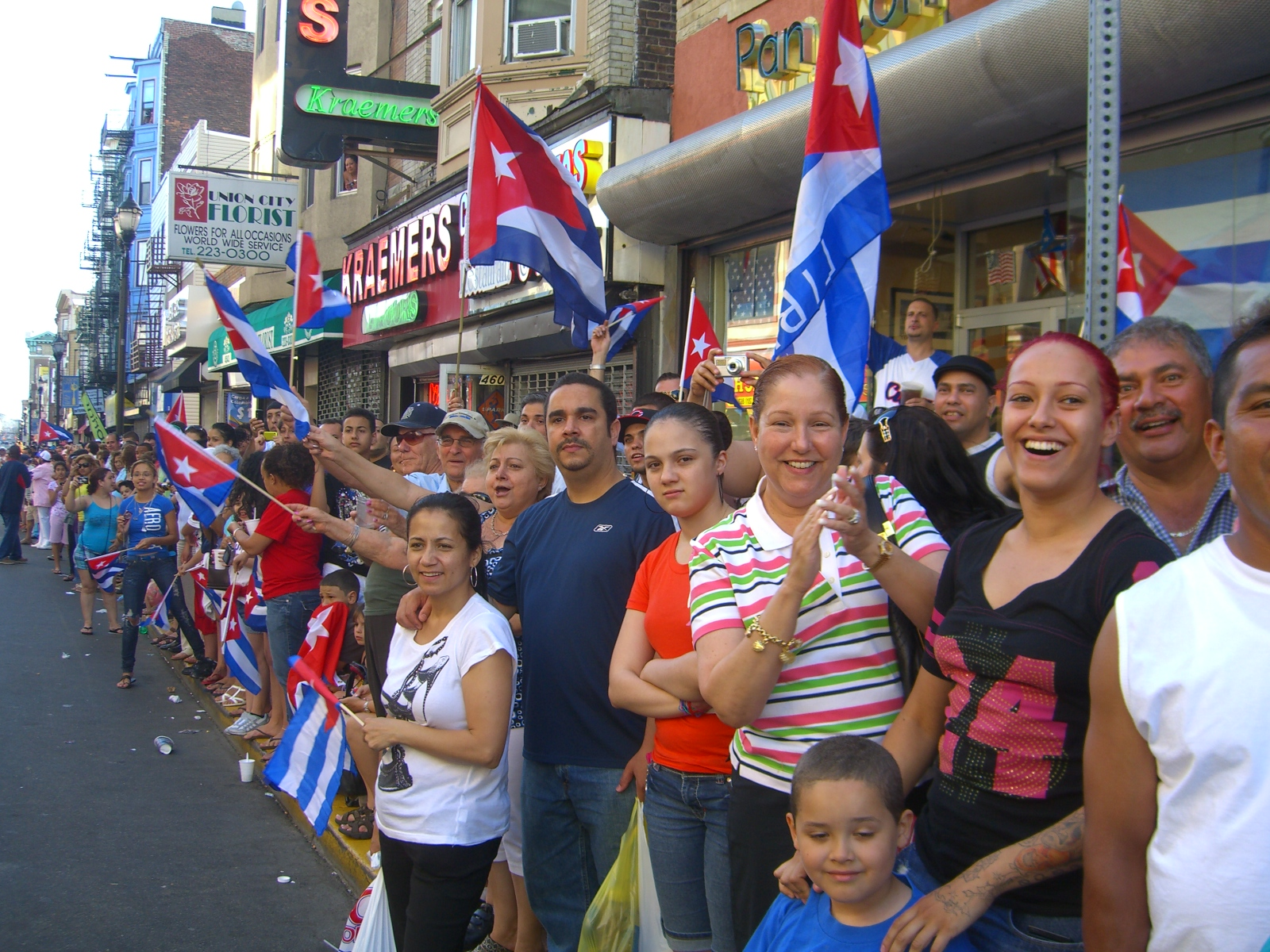
North Hudson, New Jersey, is home to a large Cuban American population.

Post-revolution Cuba has been characterized by significant levels of emigration, which has led to a large and influential diaspora community. During the three decades after January 1959, more than one million Cubans of all social classes—constituting 10% of the total population—emigrated to the United States, a proportion that matches the extent of emigration to the U.S. from the Caribbean as a whole during that period. Prior to 13 January 2013, Cuban citizens could not travel abroad, leave or return to Cuba without first obtaining official permission along with applying for a government-issued passport and travel visa, which was often denied. Those who left the country typically did so by sea, in small boats and fragile rafts.

On 9 September 1994, the U.S. and Cuban governments agreed that the U.S. would grant at least 20,000 visas annually in exchange for Cuba's pledge to prevent further unlawful departures on boats.

In the 2020s Cuba is undergoing its most severe socioeconomic crisis since the fall of the Soviet Union, leading to a record number of Cubans fleeing the island. The number of Cubans trying to enter the United States, primarily through the Mexican border, surged from 39,000 in 2021 to over 224,000 in 2022. In 2022, more than 2% of the population (almost 250,000 Cubans out of 11 million) migrated to the United States, and thousands more went to other countries, a number "larger than the 1980 Mariel boatlift and the 1994 Cuban rafter crisis combined", which were Cuba's previous largest migration events. Many resorted to selling their homes at very low prices to afford one-way flights to Nicaragua, hoping to travel through Mexico to reach the U.S. Internal migration has led to overpopulation in Havana, resulting in people living in makeshift shelters or overcrowded buildings, some of which are on the brink of collapse. Regular power outages harken back to the early 1990s, a time when Soviet subsidies ended, plunging the island into economic hardship. Emigration has continued into the 2020s, with the national population dipping below 10 million for the first time since 1980 in 2025. This signifies a 13% loss of population since 2012, when the Cuban population peaked at 11.2 million.

Cuba's "Special Period" saw the country relying heavily on foreign tourism and the earnings of nationals working abroad. The 2020 pandemic, however, severely affected this revenue stream, decreasing the number of tourists by 75% in 2020. Monetary reforms in 2021 introduced shocks of inflation, further exacerbating the country's food scarcity and boosting the black market's prominence. Despite the increasing hardships, the Cuban spirit remains resilient. Access to the internet since 2018 and widespread use of social media have fueled calls for political and economic liberalization. The power of the internet was evident during the Cuban protests of 2021, which were promptly suppressed by the police, with many prominent artists and bloggers detained.

As of 2013 the top emigration destinations were the United States, Spain, Italy, Puerto Rico, and Mexico.

=== Languages ===
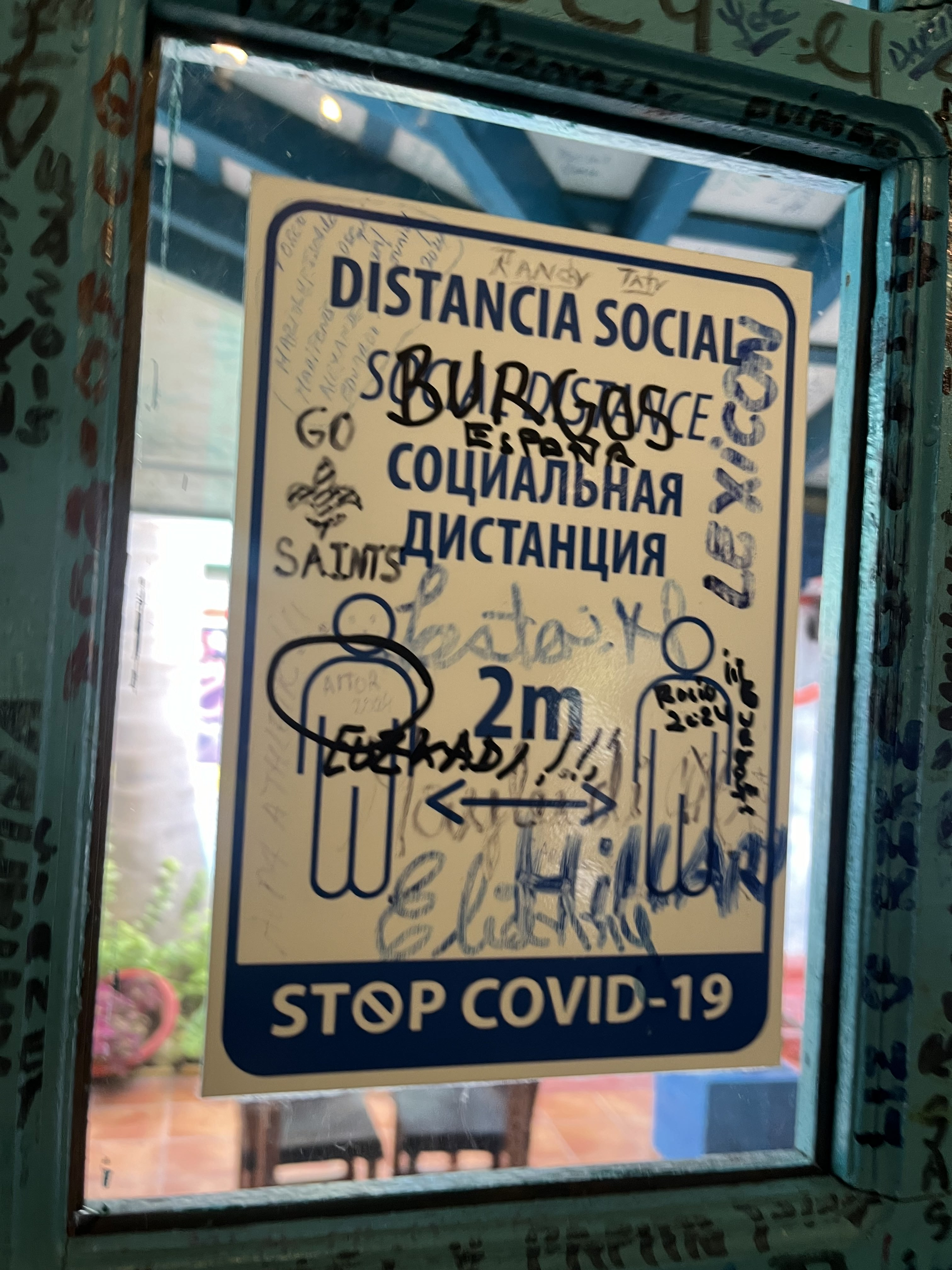
A trilingual sign encouraging social distancing in Cuba during the Covid-19 pandemic, written in Spanish, English, and Russian

The official language is Spanish, and the vast majority of Cubans speak Cuban Spanish, a form of Caribbean Spanish. Lucumí, a dialect of the West African language Yoruba, is also used as a liturgical language by practitioners of Santería, and so only as a second language. Haitian Creole is the second-most spoken language and is spoken by Haitian immigrants and their descendants. Other languages spoken by immigrants include Galician and Corsican. Russian will be the first foreign language taught in schools, as of the 2026-2027 school year.

=== Religion ===
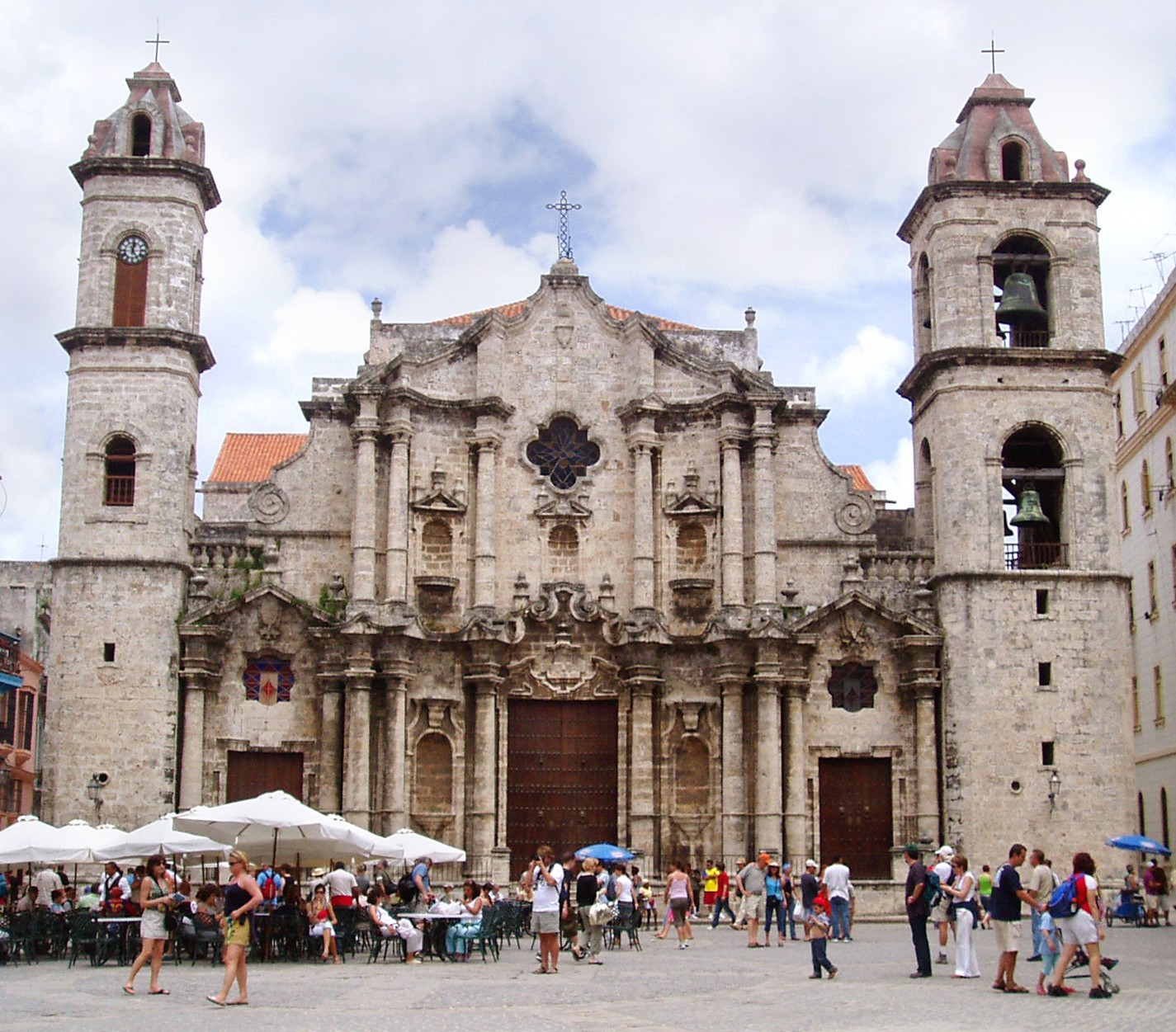
Havana Cathedral, built between 1748 and 1777

Cuba is officially a secular state. Religious freedom increased through the 1980s, with the government amending the constitution in 1992 to drop the state's characterization as atheistic. In 2010, the Pew Forum estimated that religious affiliation is 59.2% Christian, 23% unaffiliated, 17.4% folk religion (such as Santería), and the remaining 0.4% consisting of other religions. In a 2015 survey sponsored by Univision, 44% of Cubans said they were not religious, and 9% did not give an answer while only 34% said they were Christian.

Roman Catholicism is the largest religion, with its origins in Spanish colonization. Despite less than half of the population identifying as Catholics in 2006, it nonetheless remains the dominant faith. Pope John Paul II and Pope Benedict XVI visited Cuba in 1998 and 2011, respectively, and Pope Francis visited in 2015. Prior to each papal visit, the government pardoned prisoners as a humanitarian gesture.

The government's relaxation of restrictions on house churches in the 1990s led to an explosion of Pentecostalism, with some groups claiming as many as 100,000 members. However, mainline Evangelical Protestant denominations, organized into the umbrella Cuban Council of Churches, remain much more vibrant and powerful. Several well-known Cuban religious figures have operated outside the island, including the humanitarian and author Jorge Armando Pérez.

The religious landscape of is strongly defined by syncretisms of various kinds. Christianity is often practiced in tandem with Santería, a mixture of Catholicism and mostly African faiths, which include a number of cults. La Virgen de la Caridad del Cobre (the Virgin of Cobre) is the Catholic patroness of Cuba, and a symbol of Cuban culture. In Santería, she has been syncretized with the goddess Oshun. A breakdown of the followers of Afro-Cuban religions showed that most practitioners of Palo Mayombe were black and dark brown-skinned, most practitioners of Vodú were medium brown and light brown-skinned, and most practitioners of Santería were light brown and white-skinned.

Cuba hosts small communities of Jews (500 in 2012), Muslims (6,000 in 2011), and members of the Baháʼí Faith.

=== Education ===
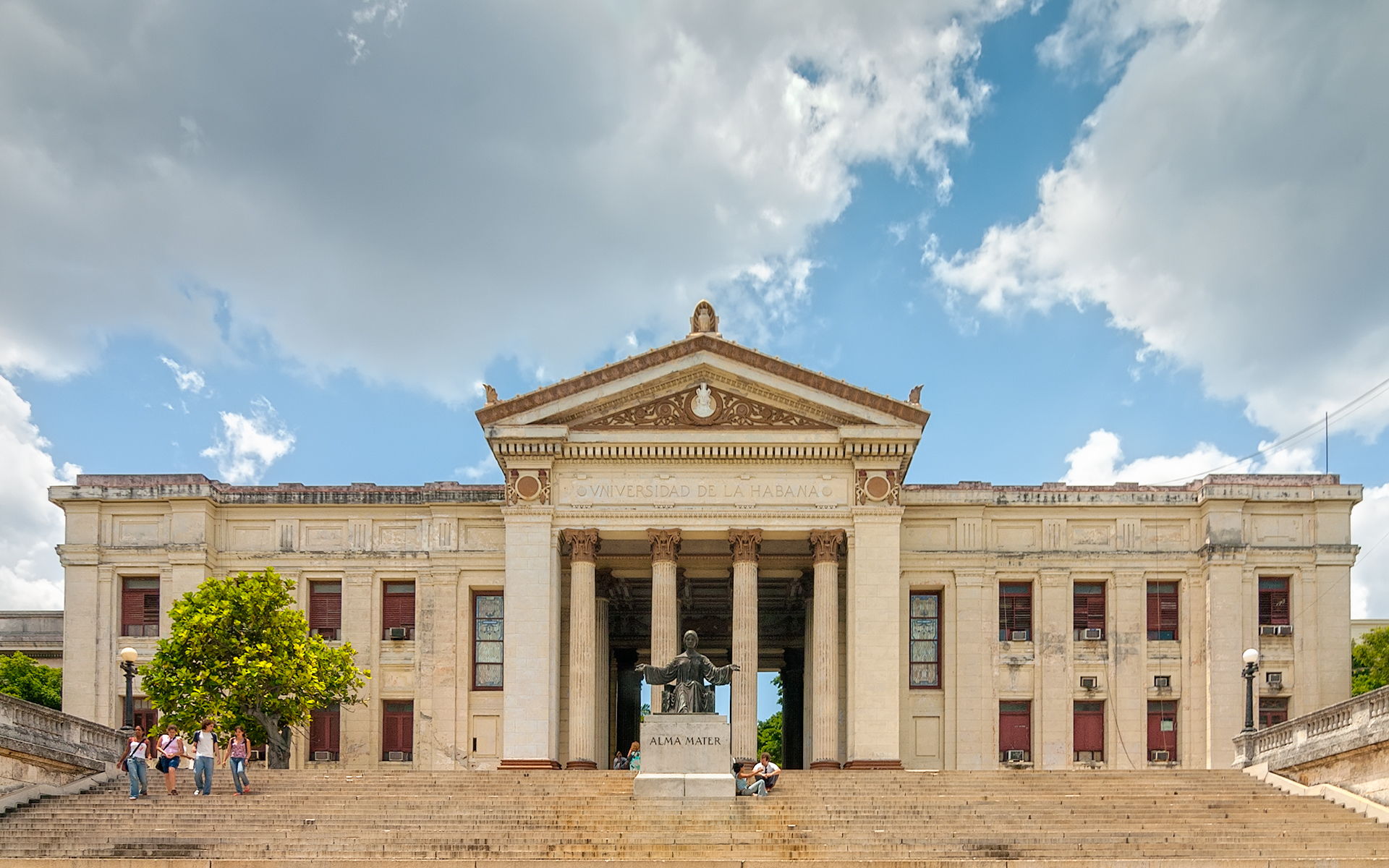
University of Havana, founded in 1728

The University of Havana was founded in 1728, and there are several other well-established colleges and universities. In 1957, just before Castro came to power, the literacy rate was as low as fourth in Latin America at 76% according to the United Nations, yet higher than in Spain. Castro created an entirely state-operated system and banned private institutions. School attendance is compulsory from ages six to the end of basic secondary education (normally at age 15), and all students, regardless of age or gender, wear school uniforms with the color denoting grade level. Primary education lasts for six years, secondary education is divided into basic and pre-university education. Cuba's literacy rate of 99.8 percent is eight points higher than the Caribbean average and the tenth-highest globally, largely due to the provision of free education at every level. The high school graduation rate is 94 percent.

Higher education is provided by universities, higher institutes, higher pedagogical institutes, and higher polytechnic institutes. The Ministry of Higher Education operates a distance education program that provides regular afternoon and evening courses in rural areas for agricultural workers. Education has a strong political and ideological emphasis, and students progressing to higher education are expected to have a commitment to the goals of Cuba. Cuba has provided free education to foreign nationals from disadvantaged backgrounds at the Latin American School of Medicine.

=== Health ===
Life expectancy development in Cuba

After the revolution, Cuba established a free public health system. Cuba's life expectancy at birth is 80.1 years (77.8 for males and 82.6 for females), ranked 58th in the world and 5th in the Americas. Infant mortality declined from 32 infant deaths per 1,000 live births in 1957, to 10 in 1990–95, 6.1 in 2000–2005 and 5.13 in 2009. Historically, Cuba has ranked high in numbers of medical personnel and has made significant contributions to world health since the 19th century.

Cuba has universal health care, and despite persistent shortages of medical supplies, there is no shortage of medical personnel. Primary care is available throughout the island, and infant and maternal mortality rates compare favorably with those in developed nations. That an impoverished nation like Cuba has health outcomes rivaling the developed world is referred to by researchers as the Cuban Health Paradox. Cuba ranks 29th on the 2024 Bloomberg Healthiest Country Index, the highest ranking of a developing country. The healthcare system, renowned for its medical services, has emphasized the export of health professionals through international missions, aiding global health efforts. However, while these missions generate significant revenue and serve as a tool for political influence, domestically, Cuba faces challenges including medication shortages and disparities between medical services for locals and foreigners. Despite the income from these missions, only a small fraction of the national budget has been allocated to public health, underscoring contrasting priorities within the nation's healthcare strategy.

Disease and infant mortality increased in the 1960s immediately after the revolution, when half of Cuba's 6,000 doctors left the country. Recovery occurred by the 1980s, and the country's health care has been widely praised. The Communist government stated that universal health care was a priority of state planning and progress was made in rural areas. After the revolution, the government increased rural hospitals from one to 62. Like the rest of the Cuban economy, medical care suffered from severe material shortages following the end of Soviet subsidies in 1991, and a tightening of the U.S. embargo in 1992. Challenges include low salaries for doctors, poor facilities, poor provision of equipment, and the frequent absence of essential drugs.

Cuba has the highest doctor-to-population ratio in the world and has sent thousands of doctors to more than 40 countries around the world. According to the World Health Organization, Cuba is "known the world over for its ability to train excellent doctors and nurses who can then go out to help other countries in need". In 2014 there were around 50,000 Cuban-trained health care workers aiding 66 nations. Cuban physicians have played a leading role in combating the Ebola virus epidemic in West Africa. Preventative medicine is very important within the Cuban medical system, which provides citizens with easy to obtain regular health checks.

Import and export of pharmaceutical drugs is done by the Quimefa Pharmaceutical Business Group (FARMACUBA) under the Ministry of Basic Industry. This group also provides technical information for the production of these drugs. Isolated from the West by the US embargo, Cuba developed the successful lung cancer vaccine, Cimavax, which is now available to US researchers for the first time, along with other novel Cuban cancer treatments. The vaccine has been available for free to the Cuban population since 2011. According to Roswell Park Comprehensive Cancer Center CEO Candace Johnson: "They've had to do more with less, so they've had to be even more innovative with how they approach things. For over 40 years, they have had a preeminent immunology community." During the thaw in Cuba–U.S. relations, many U.S. lung cancer patients traveled to Cuba to receive vaccine treatment. The end of the thaw under the Trump Administration resulted in a tightening of travel restrictions, making it harder for U.S. citizens to travel to Cuba for treatment.

In 2015, Cuba became the first country to eradicate mother-to-child transmission of HIV and syphilis, a milestone hailed by the World Health Organization as "one of the greatest public health achievements possible".

== Culture ==
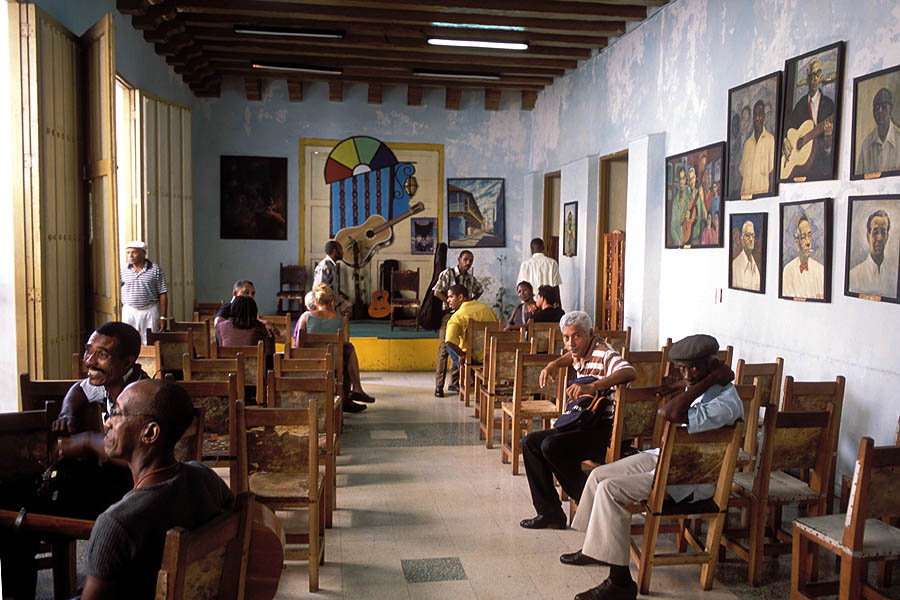
A local musical house, Casa de la Trova in Santiago de Cuba

Cuban culture is influenced by its melting pot of cultures, primarily those of Spain, West Africa, and the indigenous Guanahatabey and Taíno. After the 1959 revolution, the government started a national literacy campaign, offered free education to all and established rigorous sports, ballet, and music programs.

=== Architecture ===
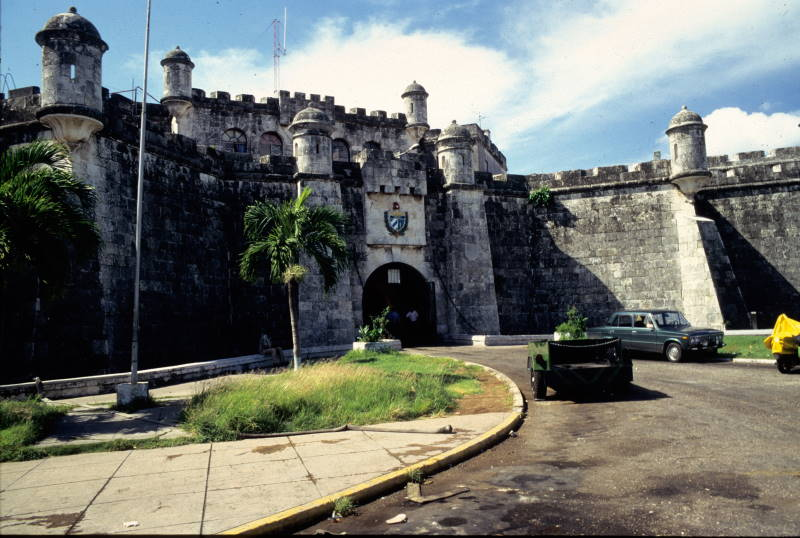
The 18th-century entrance of the Castillo del Príncipe in Havana, photo taken in 1997

Cuban architecture reflects a range of historical influences, with its foundations rooted primarily in the Spanish colonial period. Early settlements, or villas, were typically organized around a central church, surrounded by residential structures. These homes often featured interior courtyards and iron grilles, a characteristic element of colonial domestic architecture. Spanish Baroque architecture played a significant role during this era, exemplified by religious buildings such as the Basílica de San Francisco in Havana. In response to the threat of piracy, large fortifications were also constructed, contributing to the island's defensive infrastructure.

Several historic urban centers developed during the colonial period, many of which have been recognized for their architectural and cultural value. Notable examples include Havana, Camagüey, Cienfuegos and Trinidad, all of which are inscribed as UNESCO World Heritage Sites. These cities display a variety of architectural styles, ranging from Baroque and Neoclassical to eclectic influences. Additional towns such as Santiago de Cuba, Matanzas or Remedios also preserve significant colonial-era architecture.

During the Republican period (1902–1959), Cuban architecture saw the construction of prominent public and commercial buildings. Notable examples include El Capitolio, inspired by the United States Capitol, as well as modern high-rise structures such as the FOCSA Building and the Habana Hilton (later renamed Habana Libre). Architect Antonio Quintana Simonetti emerged as a leading figure during the mid-20th century, contributing to the development of modern Cuban architecture.

Following revolution, architectural styles were heavily influenced by Soviet urban planning, emphasizing functionality, uniformity, and efficiency. Residential neighborhoods constructed during this period reflected the characteristics of socialist realism seen in cities like Moscow and Minsk. After the dissolution of the Soviet Union and the end of the Cold War, architecture became more varied. The 1990s and early 21st century saw a rise in the construction of luxury hotels, incorporating modern materials such as glass and steel, and reflecting global architectural trends similar to those found in cities like Mexico City, Caracas, and New York.

=== Literature ===
Cuban literature began to find its voice in the early 19th century. Dominant themes of independence and freedom were exemplified by José Martí, who led the Modernist movement in Cuban literature. Writers such as Nicolás Guillén and José Z. Tallet focused on literature as social protest. The poetry and novels of Dulce María Loynaz and José Lezama Lima have been influential. Romanticist Miguel Barnet, who wrote Everyone Dreamed of Cuba, reflects a more melancholy Cuba.

Alejo Carpentier was important in the magic realism movement. Writers such as Reinaldo Arenas, Guillermo Cabrera Infante, and Daína Chaviano, Pedro Juan Gutiérrez, Zoé Valdés, Guillermo Rosales and Leonardo Padura have earned international recognition in the post-revolutionary era, though many of these have felt compelled to continue their work in exile due to ideological control of media by the Cuban authorities. However, some Cuban writers continue living and writing in Cuba, including Nancy Morejón.

=== Music ===
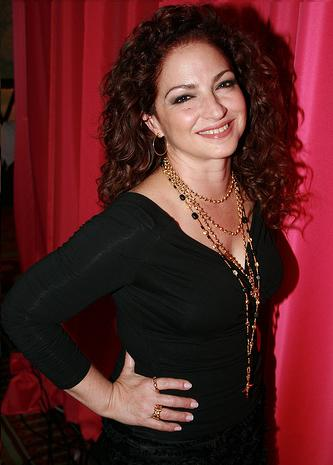
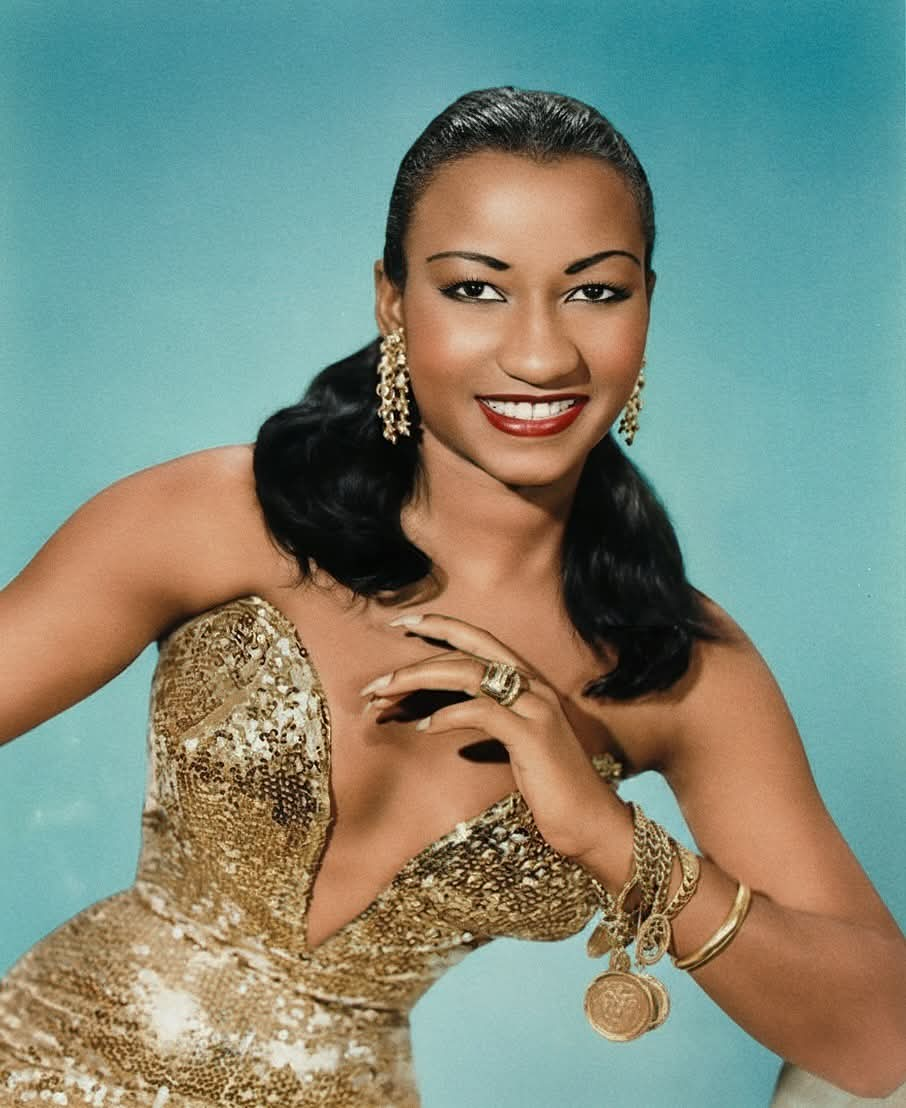
Gloria Estefan and Celia Cruz

Cuban music is rich and is the most commonly known expression of Cuban culture. The central form of this music is son, which has been the basis of many other musical styles like "Danzón de nuevo ritmo", mambo, cha-cha-chá and salsa music. Rumba ("de cajón o de solar") music originated in the early Afro-Cuban culture, mixed with Spanish elements of style. The tres was invented in Cuba from Spanish cordophone instruments models (the instrument is actually a fusion of elements from the Spanish guitar and lute). Other traditional Cuban instruments are of African origin, Taíno origin, or both, such as the maracas, güiro, marímbula and various wooden drums including the mayohuacán.

Popular Cuban music of all styles has been enjoyed and praised widely across the world. Cuban classical music, which includes music with strong African and European influences, and features symphonic works as well as music for soloists, has received international acclaim thanks to composers like Ernesto Lecuona. Havana was the heart of the rap scene in Cuba when it began in the 1990s.

=== Dance ===
The culture encompasses a wide range of dance forms. Danzón was the official musical genre and dance of Cuba. Mambo music and dance developed originally in Cuba, with further significant developments by Cuban musicians in Mexico and the US. The cha-cha-cha is another dance of Cuban origin, while the Cuban bolero originated in Santiago de Cuba in the 19th century. Concert dance is supported by the government and includes internationally renowned companies such as the Ballet Nacional de Cuba. Salsa dancing originated in Cuba, and Cuban salsa is danced around the world.

=== Media ===
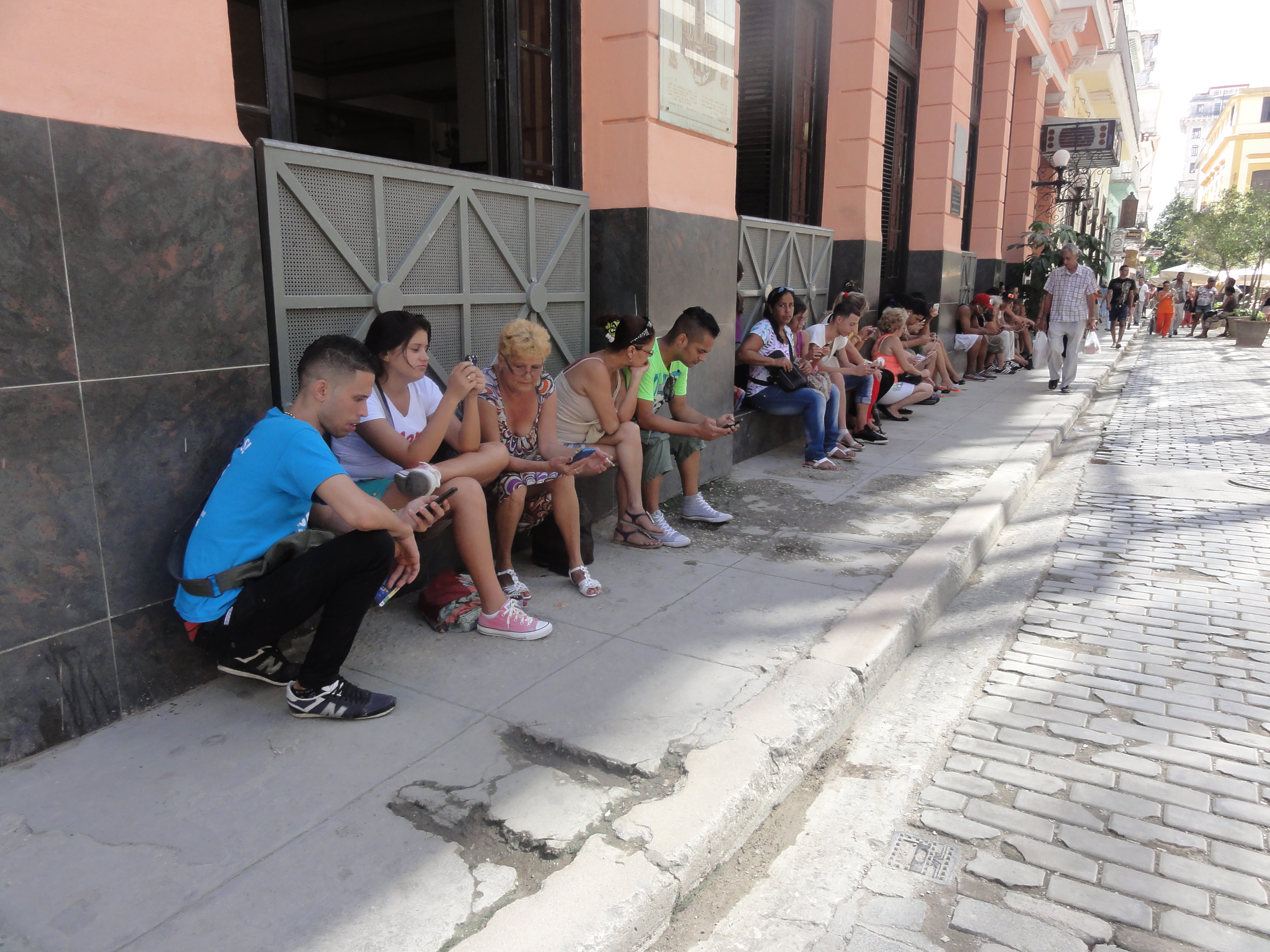
Users of a public WiFi hotspot in Havana, Cuba

ETECSA opened 118 cybercafes across the country in 2013. The government of Cuba provides an online encyclopedia website called EcuRed that operates in a "wiki" format. Internet access is controlled, and e-mail is closely monitored.

Since 2018, access to Internet by mobile data is available. In 2019, 7.1 million Cubans could access the Internet. The prices of connections, since WiFi zones, or mobile data, or from houses through "Nauta Hogar" service have been decreasing, especially since the economic reform of January 2021, when all the salaries increased by at least 5 times, and the prices of Internet remain in the same point. In 2024, it was reported that 8.19 million Cuban people have Internet access. There were 6.68 million mobile connections in Cuba in January 2021.

=== Cuisine ===
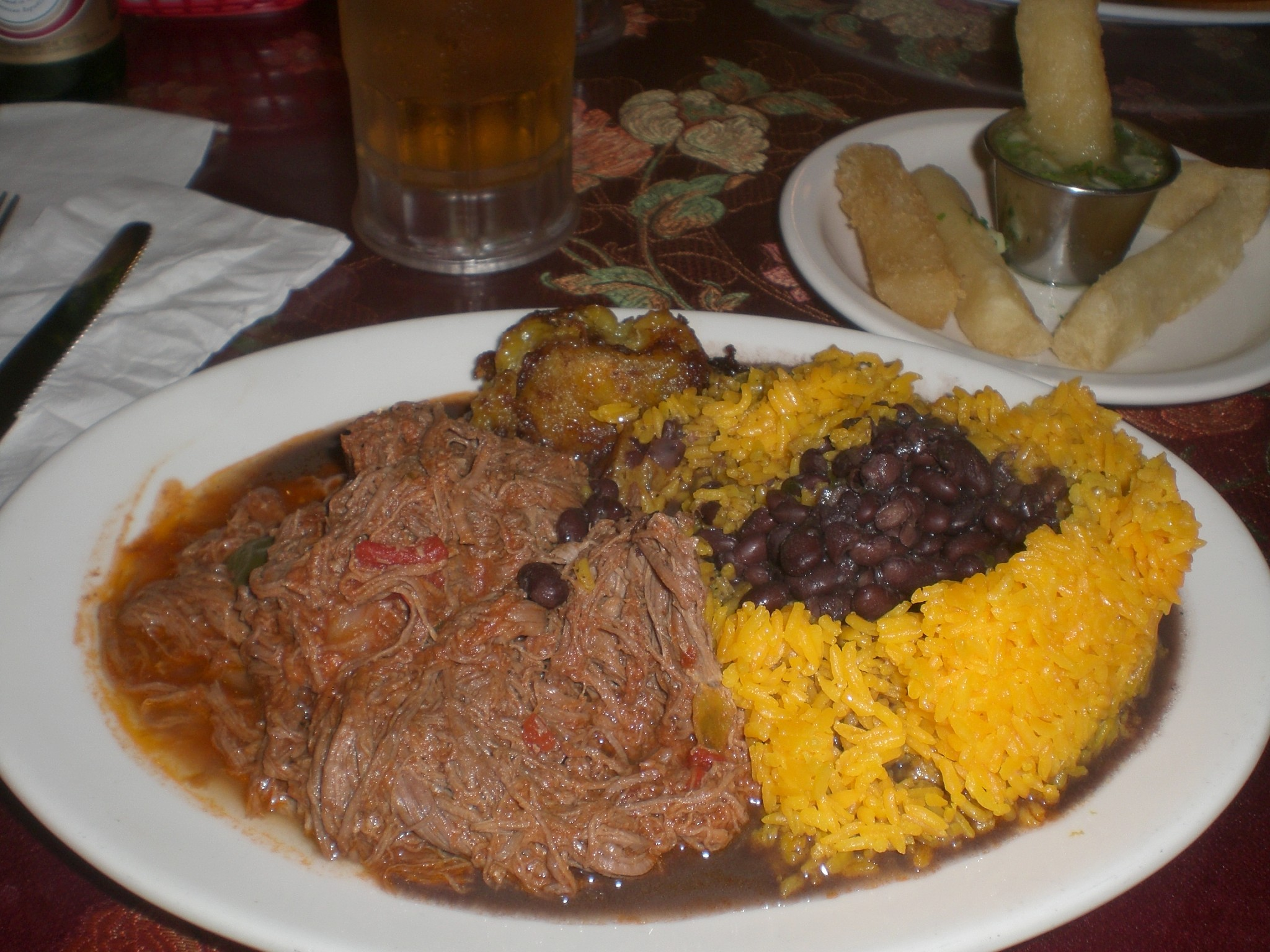
A traditional meal of ropa vieja (shredded flank steak in a tomato sauce base), black beans, yellow rice, plantains and fried yuca with beer

Cuban cuisine is a fusion of Spanish and Caribbean cuisines. Cuban recipes share spices and techniques with Spanish cooking, with some Caribbean influence in spice and flavor. Food rationing, which has been the norm for the last four decades, restricts the common availability of these dishes. The traditional meal is not served in courses; all food items are served at the same time.

The typical meal could consist of plantains, black beans and rice, ropa vieja (shredded beef), Cuban bread, pork with onions, and tropical fruits. Black beans and rice, referred to as moros y cristianos (or moros for short), and plantains are staples. Many of the meat dishes are cooked slowly with light sauces. Garlic, cumin, oregano, and bay leaves are the dominant spices.

=== Sports ===
Due to historical associations with the United States, many Cubans participate in sports that are popular in North America, rather than sports traditionally played in other Latin American nations. Baseball is the most popular. Other popular sports include volleyball, boxing, athletics, wrestling, basketball and water sports. Cuba is a dominant force in amateur boxing, consistently achieving high medal tallies in major international competitions. Boxers Rances Barthelemy and Erislandy Lara defected to the U.S. and Mexico respectively. Cuba also provides a national team that competes in the Olympic Games. Jose R. Capablanca was a Cuban world chess champion from 1921 to 1927.

== See also ==
- Human rights in Cuba
- List of Caribbean islands
- Outline of Cuba
- The Cuba Libre Story

== Bibliography ==
- Albornoz, Sara Carrillo de (2006). "On a mission: how Cuba uses its doctors abroad". The BMJ. 333 (7566): 464. doi:10.1136/bmj.333.7566.464. JSTOR 40700096. PMC 1557950. PMID 16946334.
- Allaire, Louis (2000). "Archaeology of the Caribbean Region". In Frank Salomon (ed.). South America. The Cambridge History of the Native Peoples of the Americas. Vol. III. Stuart B. Schwartz (third ed.). Cambridge: Cambridge University Press. ISBN 0-521-63075-4.
- Alvarez, José (2001). "Rationed Products and Something Else: Food Availability and Distribution in 2000". Cuba in Transition, Volume 11. Silver Spring, MD: ASCE. pp. 305–322. ISBN 978-0-9649082-0-8. Archived from the original on 24 December 2021.
- Alvarez, José (2004). Cuban Agriculture Before 1959: The Social Situation (PDF). Gainesville, FL: Department of Food and Resource Economics, University of Florida. Archived from the original (PDF) on 8 May 2018.
- Baklanoff, Eric N. (1998). "Cuba on the Eve of the Socialist Transition: A Reassessment of the Backwardness-Stagnation Thesis". Cuba in Transition, Volume 8. Silver Spring, MD: ASCE. pp. 260–272. ISBN 978-0-9649082-7-7. Archived from the original on 6 April 2023.
- Breier, Mignonne; Wildschut, Angelique (2007). Doctors in a Divided Society: The Profession and Education of Medical Practitioners in South Africa. HSRC Press. ISBN 978-0-7969-2153-6.
- Chomsky, Aviva; Carr, Barry; Smorkaloff, Pamela Maria, eds. (2004). The Cuba Reader: History, Culture, Politics. Durham, NC: Duke University Press. ISBN 978-0-8223-3197-1.
- Clodfelter, Micheal (2017). Warfare and Armed Conflicts: A Statistical Encyclopedia of Casualty and Other Figures, 1492–2015 (4th ed.). McFarland. ISBN 978-0786474707.
- Corbett, Ben (2002). This Is Cuba: An Outlaw Culture Survives. Westview Press. ISBN 978-0-8133-3826-2.
- Domínguez, Jorge I. (1978). Cuba: Order and Revolution. Cambridge, MA: Belknap Press. ISBN 978-0-674-17925-7.
- Domínguez, Jorge I. (1989). To Make a World Safe for Revolution: Cuba's Foreign Policy. Cambridge, MA: Harvard University Press. ISBN 978-0-674-89325-2.
- Domínguez, Jorge I. (2003). A Constitution for Cuba's Political Transition: The Utility of Retaining (and Amending) the 1992 Constitution (PDF). Coral Gables, FL: Institute for Cuban and Cuban-American Studies, University of Miami. ISBN 978-1-932385-04-5.
- Espino, María Dolores (2000). "Cuban Tourism During the Special Period". Cuba in Transition, Volume 10. Silver Spring, MD: ASCE. ISBN 978-0-9649082-8-4. Archived from the original on 24 December 2021.
- Falk, Pamela S. (1988). "Washing and Havana". The Wilson Quarterly. 12 (5): 64–74. JSTOR 40257732.
- Feinsilver, Julie M. (1989). "Cuba as a 'World Medical Power': The Politics of Symbolism". Latin American Research Review. 24 (2): 1–34. doi:10.1017/S0023879100022810. JSTOR 2503679.
- Gebru Tareke (2009). The Ethiopian Revolution: War in the Horn of Africa. New Haven, CT: Yale University Press. ISBN 978-0-300-14163-4.
- Gershman, Carl; Gutierrez, Orlando (January 2009). "Can Cuba Change? Ferment in Civil Society". Journal of Democracy. 20 (1): 36–53. doi:10.1353/jod.0.0051.
- Gleijeses, Piero (1996). "Cuba's First Venture in Africa: Algeria, 1961–1965". Journal of Latin American Studies. 28 (1): 159–195. doi:10.1017/s0022216x00012670. JSTOR 157991.
- Gleijeses, Piero (1997). "The First Ambassadors: Cuba's Contribution to Guinea-Bissau's War of Independence". Journal of Latin American Studies. 29 (1): 45–88. doi:10.1017/s0022216x96004646. JSTOR 158071.
- Gleijeses, Piero (2002). Conflicting Missions: Havana, Washington, and Africa, 1959–1976. Chapel Hill, NC: University of North Carolina Press. ISBN 978-0-8078-2647-8.
- Gleijeses, Piero (2010). "Cuba and the Cold War, 1959–1980". In Melvyn P. Leffler & Odd Arne Westad, eds., The Cambridge History of the Cold War, Volume II: Crises and Détente. Cambridge: Cambridge University Press. pp. 327–348. ISBN 978-0-521-83720-0.
- Gott, Richard (2004). Cuba: A New History. New Haven, CT: Yale University Press. ISBN 978-0-300-10411-0.
- Horowitz, Irving Louis (1988). Cuban Communism. New Brunswick, NJ: Transaction Books. ISBN 978-0-88738-672-5.
- McAlister, Lyle N. (1984). Spain and Portugal in the New World, 1492–1700. Minneapolis, MN: University of Minnesota Press. ISBN 978-0-8166-1216-1.
- Pedraza, Silvia (2007). Political Disaffection in Cuba's Revolution and Exodus. New York, NY: Cambridge University Press. ISBN 978-0-521-86787-0.
- Ramazani, Rouhollah K. (1975). The Persian Gulf and the Strait of Hormuz. Alphen aan den Rijn: Sijthoff & Noordhoff. ISBN 978-90-286-0069-0.
- Roy, Joaquín (2000). Cuba, the United States, and the Helms-Burton Doctrine: International Reactions. Gainesville, FL: University of Florida Press. ISBN 978-0-8130-1760-0.
- Scheina, Robert L. (2003). Latin America's Wars, Volume I: The Age of the Caudillo, 1791–1899. Dulles, VA: Brassey's. ISBN 978-1-57488-449-4.
- Scheina, Robert L. (2003b). Latin America's Wars Volume II: The Age of the Professional Soldier, 1900-2001.
- Scott, Rebecca J. (2000) [1985]. Slave Emancipation in Cuba: The Transition to Free Labor, 1860–1899. Pittsburgh, PA: University of Pittsburgh Press. ISBN 978-0-8229-5735-5.
- Smith, Wayne S. (1996). "Cuba's Long Reform". Foreign Affairs. 75 (2): 99–112. doi:10.2307/20047491. JSTOR 20047491.
- Smith, Kirby; Llorens, Hugo (1998). "Renaissance and Decay: A Comparison of Socioeconomic Indicators in Pre-Castro and Current-Day Cuba". Cuba in Transition, Volume 8. Silver Spring, MD: ASCE. pp. 247–259. ISBN 978-0-9649082-7-7. Archived from the original on 6 April 2023.
- Sweig, Julia E. (2004) [2002]. Inside the Cuban Revolution: Fidel Castro and the Urban Underground (New ed.). Cambridge, MA: Harvard University Press. ISBN 978-0-674-01612-5.
- Thomas, Hugh (1998). Cuba; or, The Pursuit of Freedom (updated ed.). Cambridge, MA: Da Capo Press. ISBN 978-0-306-80827-2.
- Westad, Odd Arne (2012). Restless Empire: China and the World Since 1750. London: The Bodley Head. ISBN 978-1-84792-197-0.
- Whiteford, Linda M.; Branch, Laurence G. (2008). Primary Health Care in Cuba: The Other Revolution. Lanham, MD: Rowman & Littlefield. ISBN 978-0-7425-5994-3.
- Wright, Irene Aloha (1916). The Early History of Cuba, 1492–1586. New York, NY: The Macmillan Company.
