= List of islands of Cuba =

This is a list of islands of Cuba. Cuba consists of 4,195 islands and cays surrounding the country's main island, a lot of which make up archipelagos. Off the south coast are two main archipelagos, Jardines de la Reina and the Canarreos Archipelago. The Sabana-Camagüey Archipelago runs along the northern coast and contains roughly 2,517 cays and islands. The Colorados Archipelago is located off the north-western coast. The following is an incomplete list of the islands of Cuba.

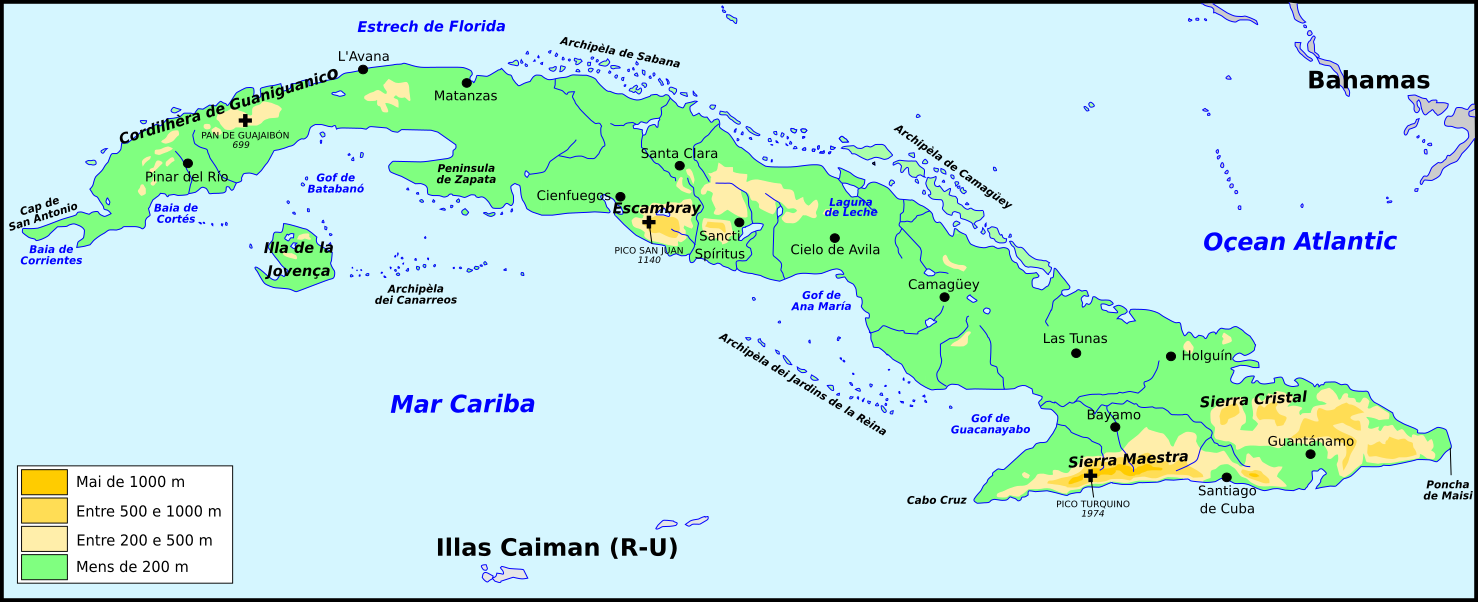
Cuba

Name	Image	Location	Area		Notes
Name	Image	Location	km^{2}	sq mi	Notes
Banco Sancho Pardo		Colorados Archipelago			
Cayo Alacranes		Colorados Archipelago			
Cayo Alcatraz		Jardines de la Reina			
Cayo Algodon Grande		Jardines de la Reina	3.70	1.43	
Cayo Anclitas		Jardines de la Reina	4.50	1.74	
Cayo Breton		Jardines de la Reina	6.70	2.59	
Cayo Buenavista		Colorados Archipelago			
Cayo Caballones		Jardines de la Reina	16.50	6.37	
Cayo Cabeza Del Este		Jardines de la Reina	6.36	2.46	
Cayo Caguamas		Jardines de la Reina	7.86	3.03	
Cayo Coco		Jardines del Rey	370	140	
Cayo Confites		Sabana-Camagüey Archipelago			Nearest point of Cuba to The Bahamas (Cay Lobos): 14 mi (22.5 km)
Cayo Cruz del Padre		Sabana-Camagüey Archipelago			
Cayo De Las Doce Leguas		Jardines de la Reina	26.80	10.35	
Cayo Esquivel		Jardines del Rey			
Cayo Fragoso	List of islands of Cuba is located in Cuba	Sabana-Camagüey Archipelago	101	39	
Cayo Guajaba	List of islands of Cuba is located in Cuba	Jardines del Rey			
Cayo Guillermo		Jardines del Rey			There are 4 all-inclusive tourist resorts on the north side of this island.
Cayo Ines de Soto		Colorados Archipelago			
Cayo Jutías		Colorados Archipelago			
Cayo Largo del Sur		Canarreos Archipelago			The second-largest island in the Canarreos Archipelago; approximately 25 kilometers (16 mi) long and 3 kilometers (1.9 mi) wide.
Cayo Las Brujas		Ciego de Ávila Province			
Cayo Levisa		Colorados Archipelago	1.5	0.58	
Cayo Punta Arenas		Colorados Archipelago			
Cayo Rapado Grande		Colorados Archipelago			
Cayo Romano	List of islands of Cuba is located in Cuba	Jardines del Rey	777	300	The largest island in Jardines del Rey; .
Cayo Sabinal	List of islands of Cuba is located in Cuba	Jardines del Rey	335	129	
Cayo Saetia		Jardines del Rey	42	16	
Cayo Santa María		Jardines del Rey	21.4	8.3	This island is a popular tourist destination.
Cayos Ana Maria		Jardines de la Reina	14.76	5.70	In 2012 it had a population of 10.
Cayos Cinco Balas		Jardines de la Reina	13.50	5.21	
Cayos Granada		Jardines de la Reina	16.63	6.42	
Cayos Media Luna		Jardines de la Reina	7.10	2.74	
Cayos Mordazo		Jardines de la Reina	9.30	3.59	
Cayos Pingues		Jardines de la Reina	20.46	7.90	
Cayos Punta Tabaco		Colorados Archipelago			
Ernst Thälmann Island	List of islands of Cuba is located in Cuba	Canarreos Archipelago			Formerly Cayo Blanco del Sur, this 15 km-long (9.3 mi), 500-metre-wide (1,600 ft) island is named after Ernst Thälmann, a German Communist politician and activist.
Isla de la Juventud		Canarreos Archipelago	2,200	850	Cuba's second-largest island, and the largest among Canarreos Archipelago's 350 islands. Located almost directly south of Havana, its population is approximately 76,000.

== See also ==
- List of Caribbean islands
