= Geography of Cuba =

Geography of the Archipelago of Cuba
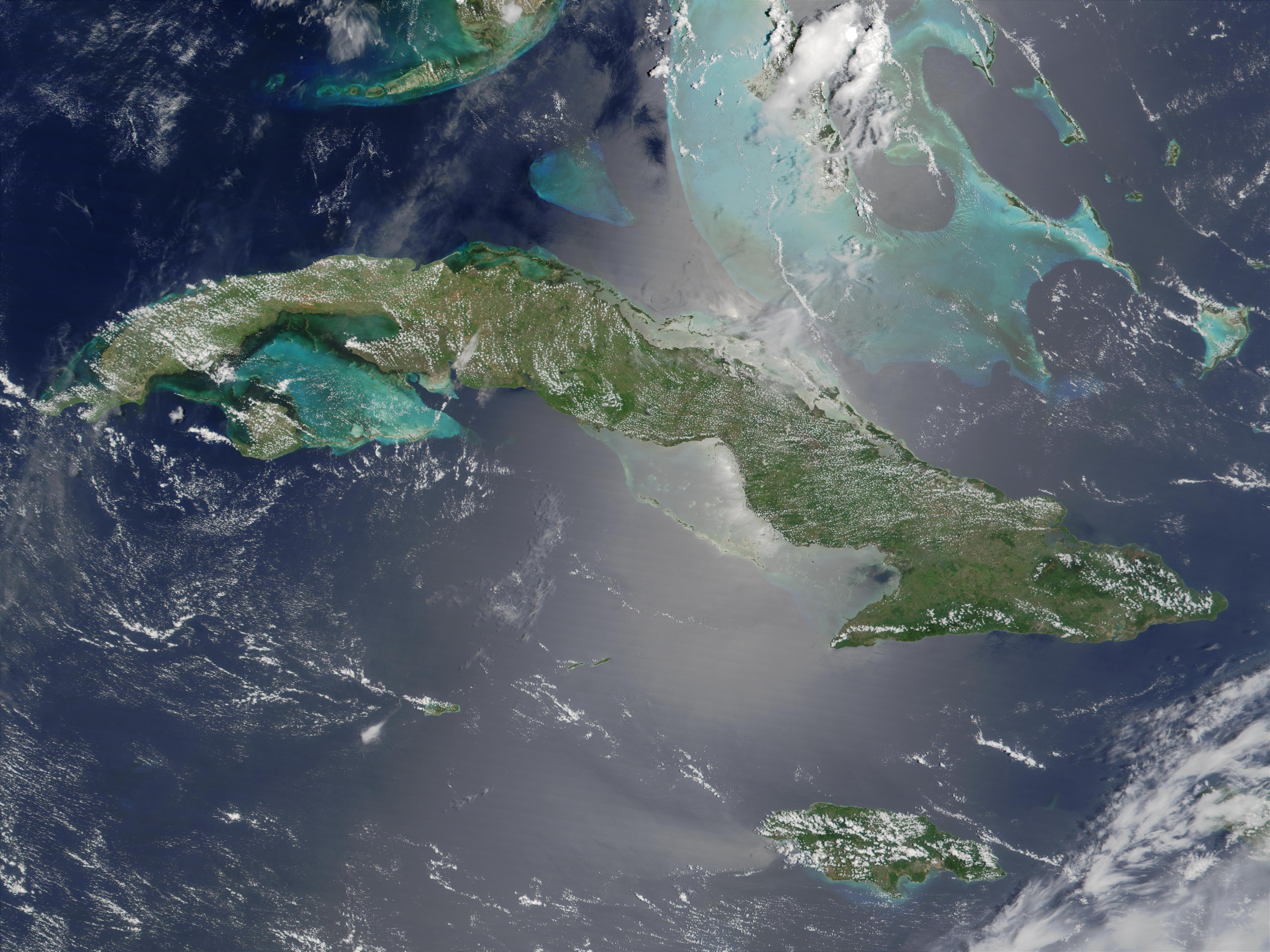
- Cuba seen from space
- Continent: North America
- Region: Caribbean Sea
- Coordinates: 22°00′N 80°00′W
- Area: Ranked 104th
  - Total: 110,860 km^{2} (42,800 sq mi)
  - Land: 99.06%
  - Water: 0.94%
- Coastline: 3,735 km (2,321 mi)
- Borders: 28,5 km with United States at Guantanamo Bay Naval Base
- Highest point: Pico Turquino; 1,974 metres (6,476 ft)
- Lowest point: Caribbean Sea; 0 m
- Longest river: Cauto River
- Exclusive economic zone: 350,751 km^{2} (135,426 mi^{2})

Cuba is an island nation in the Caribbean Sea. It comprises an archipelago of islands centred upon the geographic coordinates 21°3N, 80°00W. Cuba is the principal island, surrounded by four main archipelagos: the Colorados, the Sabana-Camagüey, the Jardines de la Reina and the Canarreos. Cuba's area is 110,860 km^{2} (42,800 sq mi) with a land area of 109,820 km^{2} (42,400 sq mi) according to the CIA, which makes it the eighth-largest island country in the world. The main island (Cuba) has 5,746 km (3,570 mi) of coastline and 28.5 km (17.7 mi) of land borders—all figures including the U.S. Navy's Guantanamo Bay Naval Base. Its official area is 109,884 km^{2} (42,426 sq mi).

Cuba lies west of the North Atlantic Ocean, east of the Gulf of Mexico, south of the Straits of Florida, northwest of the Windward Passage, and northeast of the Yucatán Channel. The main island (Cuba), at 104,338 km^{2} (40,285 sq mi), makes up most of the land area and is the 17th-largest island in the world by land area.

The island is 1,250 km (780 mi) long and 191 km (119 mi) across its widest points and 31 km (19 mi) across its narrowest points. The largest island outside the main island is the Isla de la Juventud is (Isle of Youth) in the southwest, with an area of 2,204 km^{2} (851 sq mi).

The main island consists mostly of flat to rolling plains. At the southeastern end is the Sierra Maestra, a range of steep mountains whose highest point is the Pico Turquino at 1,974 metres (6,476 ft).

Havana is the largest city and capital; other major cities include Santiago de Cuba and Camagüey. Better-known smaller towns include Baracoa, which was the first Spanish settlement on Cuba, Trinidad, a UNESCO world heritage site, and Bayamo.

== Physical geography ==
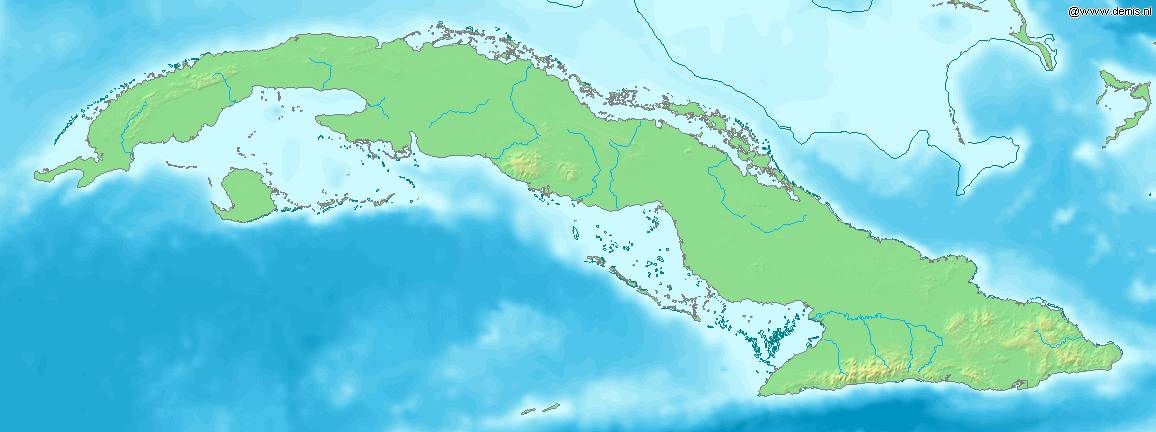
Geography of Cuba

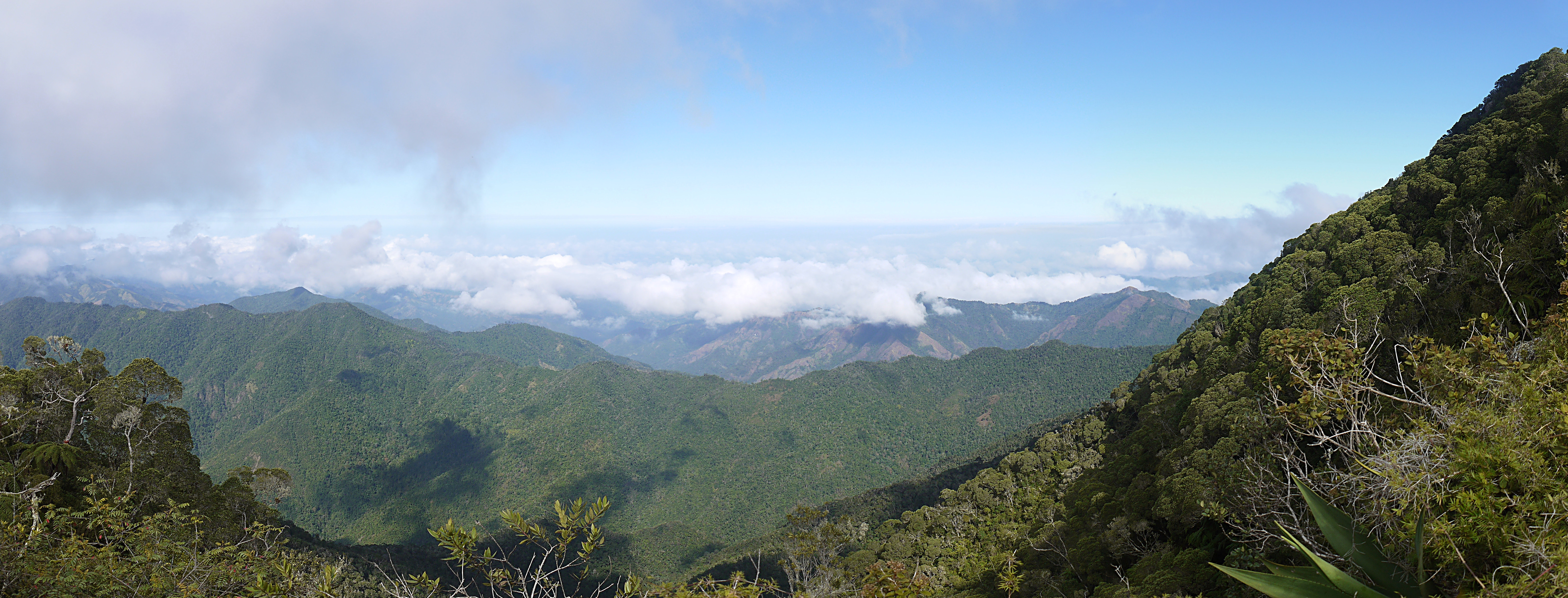
Sierra Maestra

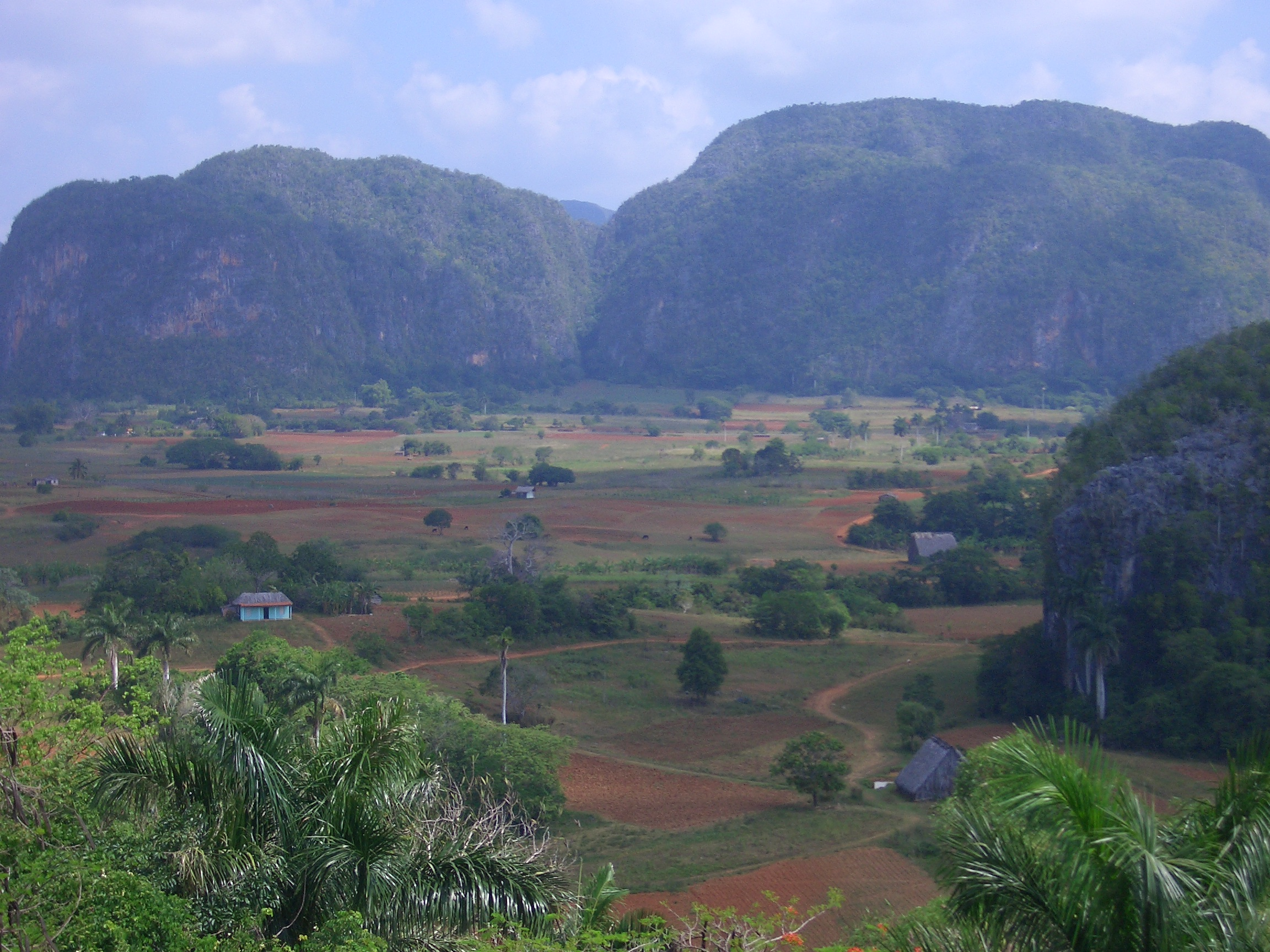
Viñales Valley

Cuba is located 78 km (48 mi) west of Haiti across the Windward Passage, 22.5 km (14.0 mi) south of The Bahamas (Cay Lobos), 150 km (93 mi) south of the United States (Key West, Florida), 210 km (130 mi) east of Mexico, and 148 km (92 mi) north of Jamaica. It was made in three stages.

Cuba is the largest country by land area in the Caribbean. Its main island is the 17th-largest island in the world by land area. The island rises between the Atlantic Ocean and the Caribbean. It is bordered on the north by the Straits of Florida, on the northeast by Nicholas Channel and the Old Bahama Channel. The southern part is bounded by the Windward Passage and the Cayman Trench, while the southwest lies in the Caribbean Sea. To the west, it reaches to the Yucatán Channel, and the northwest is open to the Gulf of Mexico.

About 4,195 islands, islets and cays make up the country. The southern coast includes such archipelagos as Jardines de la Reina and the Canarreos. The northeastern shore is lined by the Sabana-Camagüey Archipelago, which includes Jardines del Rey and is composed of approximately 2,517 cays and islands. The Colorados Archipelago is developed on the northwestern coast.

=== Terrain ===
Cuba's terrain is mostly flat or rolling plains, with rugged hills and mountains in the southeast. The lowest point is the Caribbean Sea at 0 m (sea level) and the highest point is Pico Turquino at 1,974 m (6,476 ft), part of the Sierra Maestra mountain range, located in the southeast of the island.

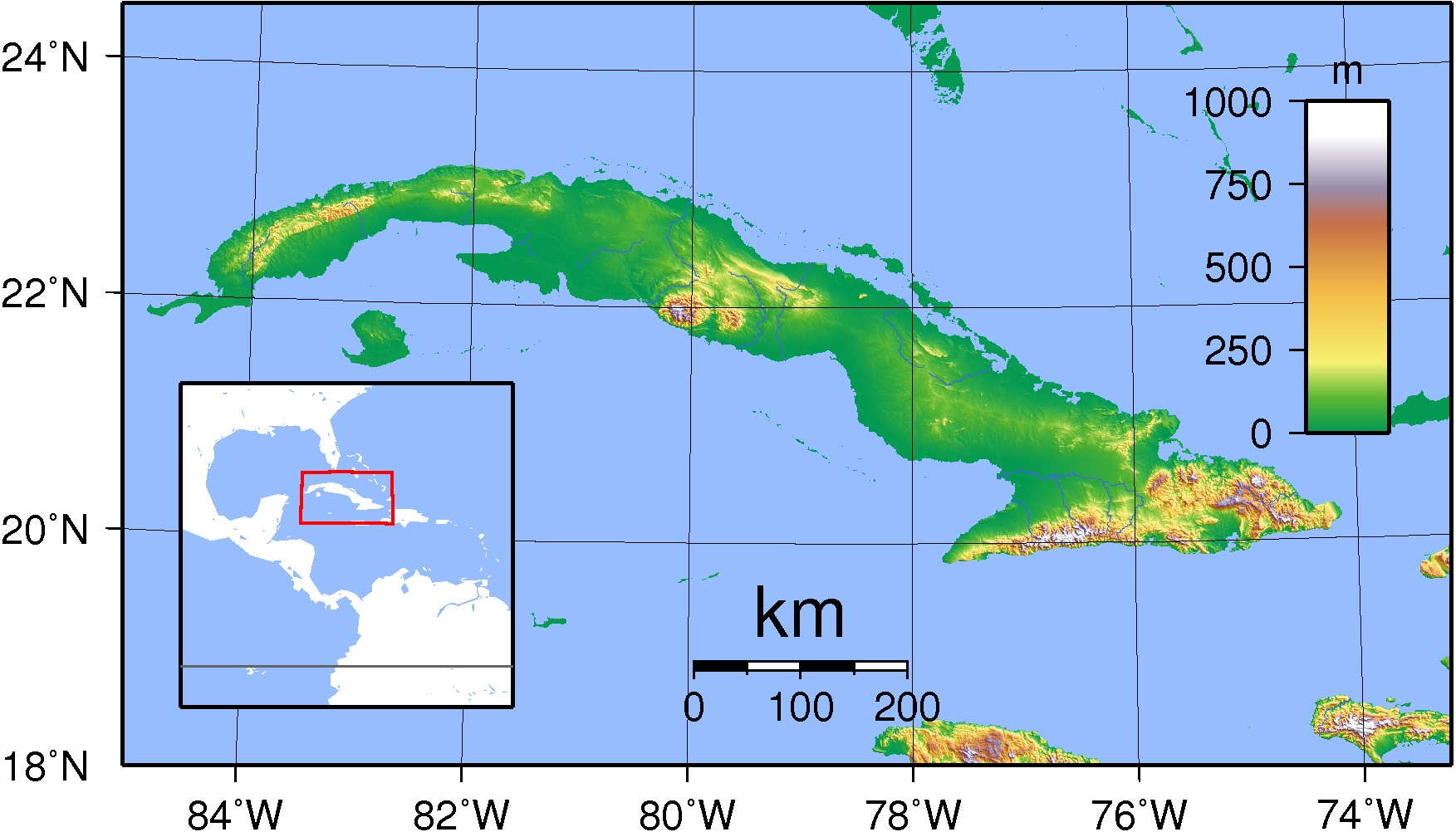
Topographical map of Cuba

Other mountain ranges are Sierra Cristal in the southeast, Escambray Mountains in the center of the island, and Sierra del Rosario in the northwest. White sand beaches (most notably in Varadero), as well as mangroves and marshes can be found in the coastal area. The largest is the Zapata Swamp, with over 4,520 km^{2} (1,750 sq mi). A recent global remote sensing analysis suggested that there were 675 km^{2} of tidal flats in Cuba, making it the 38th-ranked country in terms of tidal flat area.

Cuba has negligible inland water area. The largest natural water mirror is Laguna de Leche at 67.2 km^{2} (25.9 sq mi), while the man-made Zaza Reservoir, at 113.5 km^{2} (43.8 sq mi), is the largest inland water surface by area in the country.

=== Climate ===
Köppen climate classification zones of Cuba

Casa Blanca, Havana

Climate chart (precipitation, max. and min. temperature)
J	F	M	A	M	J	J	A	S	O	N	D
64 26 19	69 26 19	46 28 20	54 29 21	98 30 22	182 31 23	106 31 24	100 32 24	144 31 24	181 29 23	88 28 21	58 27 20
- █ Average max. and min. temperatures in °C
- █ Precipitation totals in mm
- Source: Climate Charts
Imperial conversion
J	F	M	A	M	J	J	A	S	O	N	D
2.5 79 66	2.7 79 66	1.8 82 68	2.1 84 70	3.9 86 72	7.2 88 73	4.2 88 75	3.9 90 75	5.7 88 75	7.1 84 73	3.5 82 70	2.3 81 68
- █ Average max. and min. temperatures in °F
- █ Precipitation totals in inches

Most of Cuba has a tropical savanna climate (Aw according to the Köppen climate classification), although areas on the windward slopes of the Sierra Maestra and Sierra del Rosario have either a tropical monsoon climate or a trade-wind tropical rainforest climate, whilst a hot semi-arid climate occurs in the Guantánamo Bay area because of a rain shadow from the Sierra Maestra. In most areas, the dry season lasts from November to April and the rainy season from May to October.

The climate is tropical, though moderated by trade winds. In general (with local variations), there is a drier season from November to April, and a rainier season from May to October. The average temperature is 23.1 °C (73.6 °F) in January and 27 °C (80.6 °F) in July.

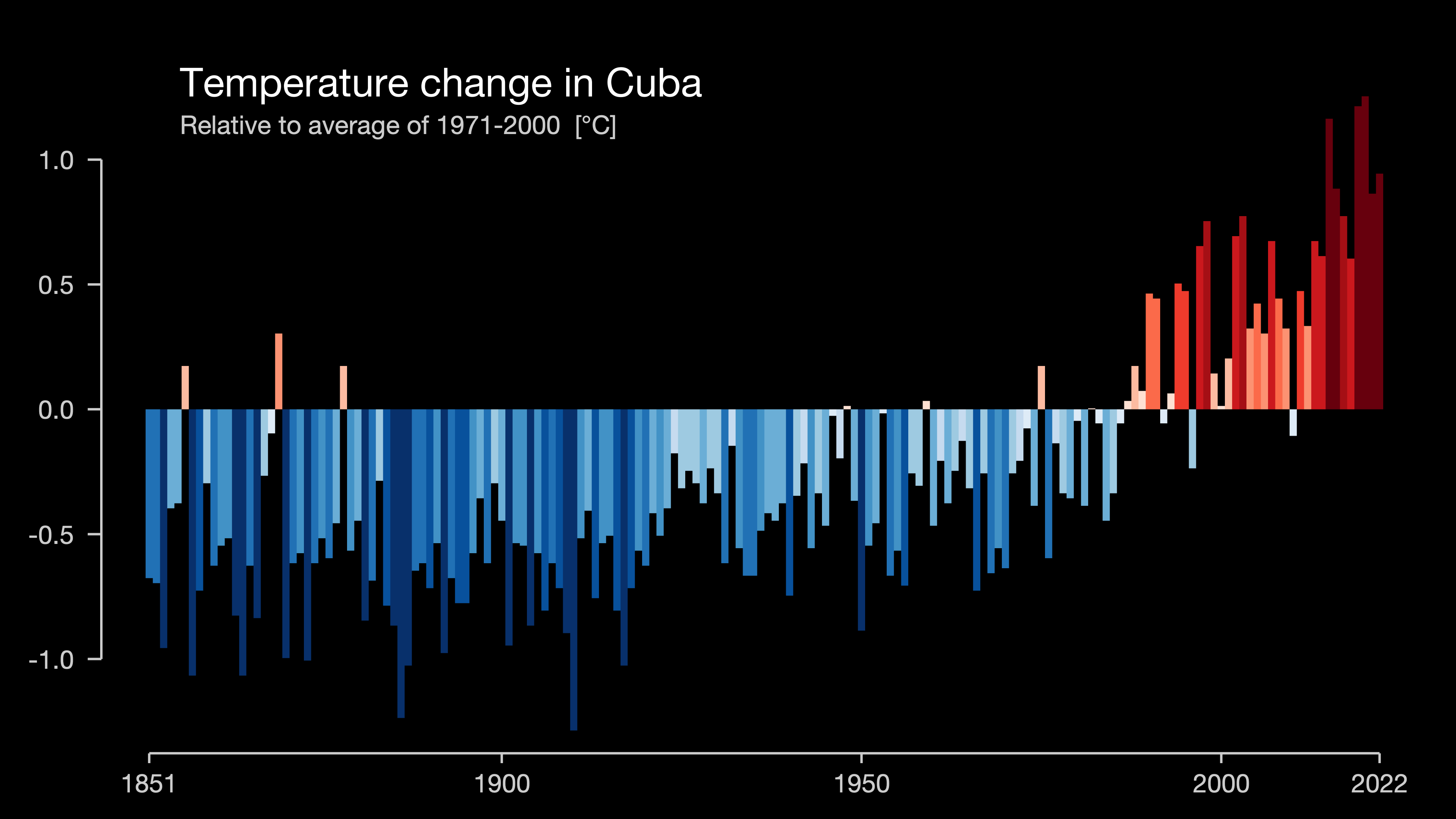
Temperature change in Cuba, each bar represents the average temperature over that year.

Climate change in Cuba is causing an increase in temperature, rising sea levels and shifting precipitation patterns, with an overall decrease in rainfall predicted. These will severely impact industries key to the economy, including agriculture, forestry and tourism. As rainfall is Cuba's only water source, water security is an issue. Warmer temperatures may affect the health of the population, causing an increase in cardiovascular, respiratory and viral diseases. A temperature rise of 2°C above preindustrial levels can increase the likelihood of extreme hurricane rainfall by three times in Cuba. Cuba's climate mitigation and adaptation plans include renewable energy generation and nature-based solutions, such as restoring mangrove ecosystems.

Cuba lies in the path of hurricanes, and these destructive storms are most common in September and October. The experience of hurricane damage has shaped Cuba's disaster risk reduction policies, contributing to a low mortality rate compared with neighbouring countries. Tornadoes are somewhat rare in Cuba; however, on the evening of 27 January 2019, a very rare strong F4 tornado struck the eastern side of Havana, Cuba's capital city. The tornado caused extensive damage, destroying at least 90 homes, killing four people and injuring 195. By 4 February, the death toll had increased to six, with 11 people still in critical condition.

Climate data for Havana (1961–1990, extremes 1859–present)
Month	Jan	Feb	Mar	Apr	May	Jun	Jul	Aug	Sep	Oct	Nov	Dec	Year
Record high °C (°F)	32.4 (90.3)	33.0 (91.4)	35.3 (95.5)	37.0 (98.6)	36.2 (97.2)	35.4 (95.7)	36.6 (97.9)	37.7 (99.9)	38.2 (100.8)	39.6 (103.3)	34.0 (93.2)	33.2 (91.8)	39.6 (103.3)
Mean daily maximum °C (°F)	25.8 (78.4)	26.1 (79.0)	27.6 (81.7)	28.6 (83.5)	29.8 (85.6)	30.5 (86.9)	31.3 (88.3)	31.6 (88.9)	31.0 (87.8)	29.2 (84.6)	27.7 (81.9)	26.5 (79.7)	28.8 (83.8)
Daily mean °C (°F)	22.2 (72.0)	22.4 (72.3)	23.7 (74.7)	24.8 (76.6)	26.1 (79.0)	27.0 (80.6)	27.6 (81.7)	27.9 (82.2)	27.4 (81.3)	26.1 (79.0)	24.5 (76.1)	23.0 (73.4)	25.2 (77.4)
Mean daily minimum °C (°F)	18.6 (65.5)	18.6 (65.5)	19.7 (67.5)	20.9 (69.6)	22.4 (72.3)	23.4 (74.1)	23.8 (74.8)	24.1 (75.4)	23.8 (74.8)	23.0 (73.4)	21.3 (70.3)	19.5 (67.1)	21.6 (70.9)
Record low °C (°F)	6.0 (42.8)	11.9 (53.4)	10.0 (50.0)	15.1 (59.2)	15.4 (59.7)	20.0 (68.0)	19.0 (66.2)	20.0 (68.0)	20.0 (68.0)	18.0 (64.4)	14.0 (57.2)	10.0 (50.0)	6.0 (42.8)
Average rainfall mm (inches)	64.4 (2.54)	68.6 (2.70)	46.2 (1.82)	53.7 (2.11)	98.0 (3.86)	182.3 (7.18)	105.6 (4.16)	99.6 (3.92)	144.4 (5.69)	180.5 (7.11)	88.3 (3.48)	57.6 (2.27)	1,189.2 (46.84)
Average rainy days (≥ 1.0 mm)	5	5	3	3	6	10	7	9	10	11	6	5	80
Average relative humidity (%)	75	74	73	72	75	77	78	78	79	80	77	75	76
Mean monthly sunshine hours	217.0	203.4	272.8	273.0	260.4	237.0	272.8	260.4	225.0	195.3	219.0	195.3	2,831.4
Mean daily sunshine hours	7.0	7.2	8.8	9.1	8.4	7.9	8.8	8.4	7.5	6.3	7.3	6.3	7.8
Source 1: World Meteorological Organisation, Climate-Charts.com
Source 2: Meteo Climat (record highs and lows), Deutscher Wetterdienst (sun)

Average Sea Temperature in Havana
Jan	Feb	Mar	Apr	May	Jun	Jul	Aug	Sep	Oct	Nov	Dec
23 °C (73 °F)	23 °C (73 °F)	24 °C (75 °F)	26 °C (79 °F)	27 °C (81 °F)	28 °C (82 °F)	28 °C (82 °F)	28 °C (82 °F)	28 °C (82 °F)	27 °C (81 °F)	26 °C (79 °F)	24 °C (75 °F)

=== Maritime claims ===
Cuba makes maritime claims that include a territorial sea of 12 nautical miles (22.2 km; 13.8 mi) and an exclusive economic zone of 350,751 km^{2} (135,426 mi^{2}) with 200 nautical miles (370.4 km; 230.2 mi).

=== Extreme points ===
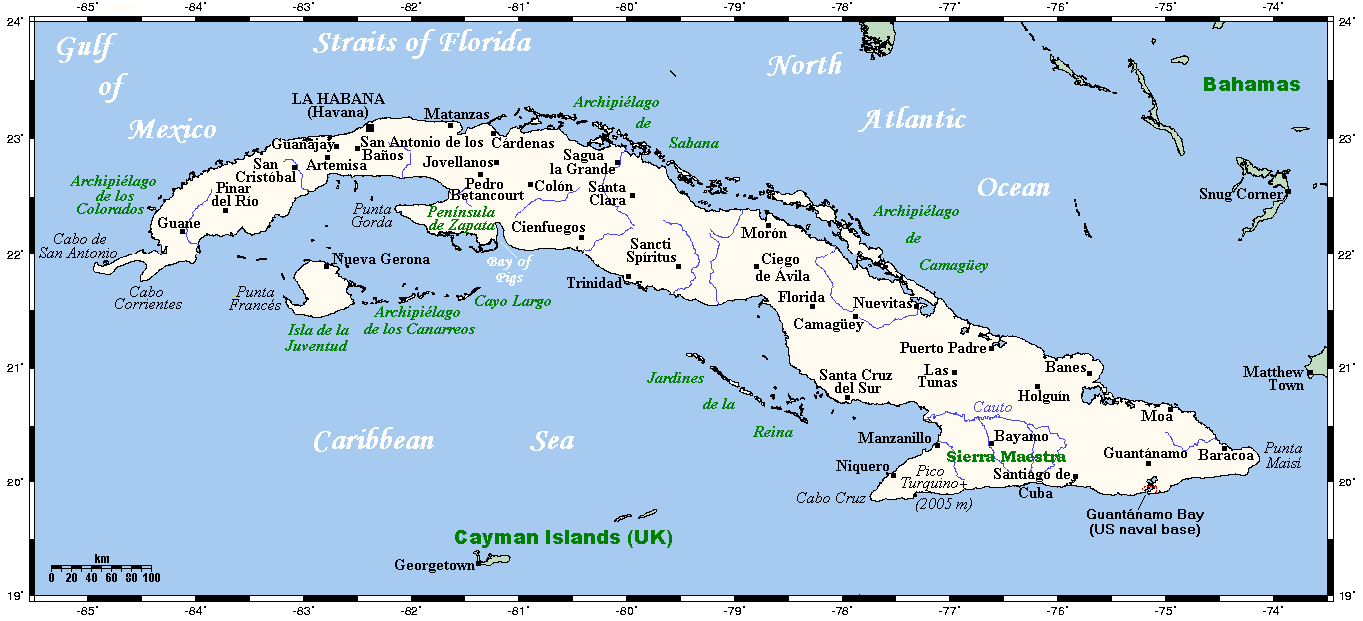
Places in Cuba.

Extreme points in Cuba are:

Point	Name	Location	Remarks
North (on-shore)	Punta Hicacos	23.205364996518945°N 81.14309760226082°W	On Hicacos Peninsula
North (off-shore)	Cayo Cruz del Padre	23.277666130750777°N 80.90271748882353°W	Part of Sabana-Camagüey Archipelago
East	Cape Maisí	20.20889°N 74.13361°W	Near Maisí
West	Cape San Antonio	21.86083°N 84.95694°W	On Guanahacabibes Peninsula
South	Cape Cruz	19.82694°N 77.67500°W	Near Niquero
Highest point	Pico Turquino	19.98944°N 76.83583°W	Part of Sierra Maestra, 1,974 m (6,476 ft)
Lowest point	sea level		Caribbean and Atlantic Ocean
Largest city	Havana	23.13333°N 82.38333°W	National capital, population 2,130,431
Oldest city	Baracoa	20.34861°N 74.51056°W	Founded in 1511

== Natural resources ==
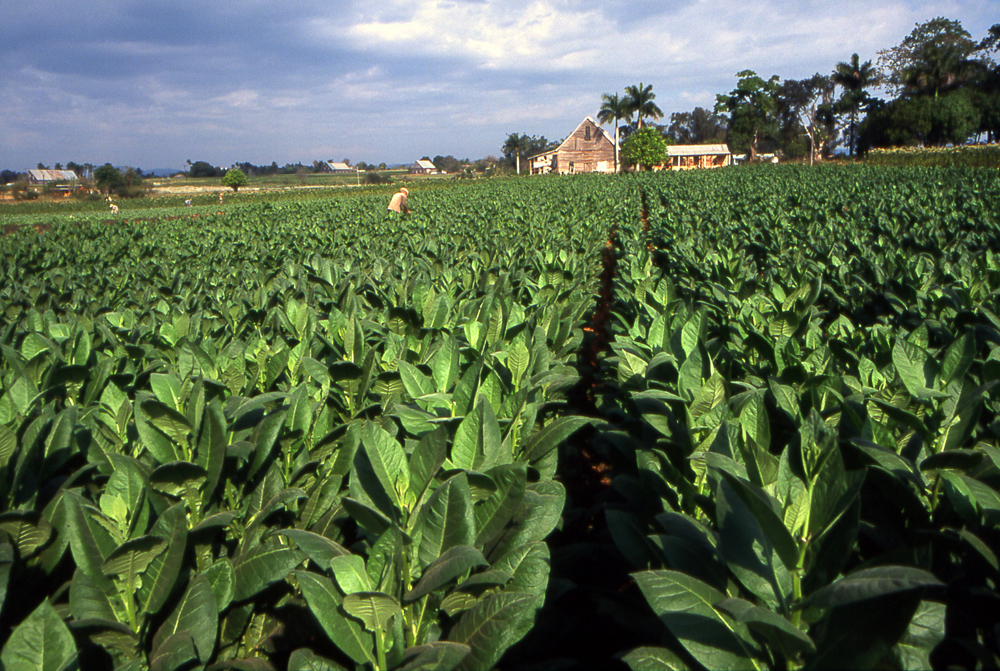
A tobacco field in Pinar del Río

Natural resources include cobalt, nickel, iron ore, copper, salt, timber, silica, oil and petroleum. At one time the whole island was covered with forests, and there are still many cedar (Cedrela odorata), chechem (Metopium brownei), mahogany (Swietenia mahagoni), and other valuable trees. Large areas were cleared to grow more sugarcane, and so few trees remained that timber had to be imported.

The most important Cuban mineral economic resource is nickel. Cuba has the second-largest nickel reserves in the world after Russia. Sherritt International, a Canadian energy company, operates a large nickel mining facility in Moa, Cuba. Another leading mineral resource is cobalt, a byproduct of nickel mining operations. Cuba ranks as the fifth-largest producer of refined cobalt in the world.

Cuba has historically been dependent on oil imports. As of 2011, Cuba had proven reserves of a mere 0.1 billion barrels (16,000,000 m^{3}) of crude oil and 2.5 trillion cubic feet of natural gas, and mostly used oil for power generation. In 2010, Cuba produced 51,000 barrels of crude oil a day (Kb/d) in 2010 in onshore or shallow near-shore development, "mostly heavy, sour (sulfur-rich) crude that requires advanced refining capacity to process." Offshore exploration in the North Cuba Basin had revealed the possibility of an additional 4.6 billion barrels (730,000,000 m^{3}) of technically recoverable crude oil, 0.9 billion barrels of natural gas liquids, and 9.8 trillion cubic feet of natural gas. As of 2011, Cuba had six offshore petroleum development projects with foreign oil companies Petrovietnam (Vietnam), Petronas (Malaysia), PDVSA (Venezuela), Sonangol (Angola), ONGC (India), Repsol (Spain), and Statoil (Norway).

Sugarcane was historically the most important part of the Cuban economy, and large areas are still dedicated to its cultivation; in 2018, Cuba produced an estimated 1.1–1.3 million tonnes of raw sugar. The importance of the sugar harvest has declined, with tourism, tobacco, nickel, and pharmaceuticals surpassing sugar in economic importance.

Extensive irrigation systems are developed in the south of Sancti Spíritus Province. Tobacco, used for some of the world's cigars, is grown especially in the Pinar del Río Province.

== Administrative subdivisions ==
Cuba map of provinces and capitals

Cuba is divided into 15 provinces and one special municipality. Provinces are further subdivided into 168 municipalities.
