= List of lighthouses in Cuba =

This is a list of lighthouses in Cuba.

== Lighthouses ==
Name	Image	Year built	Location & coordinates	Class of Light	Focal height	NGA number	Admiralty number	Range nml
Aserradero Lighthouse		n/a	Guamá; 19°59′08.7″N 76°10′09.6″W	Fl W 19s.	60 metres (200 ft)	13154	J5048	10
Cabo Corrientes Lighthouse		1930 est.	Guanahacabibes Peninsula; 21°45′42.5″N 84°30′56.8″W	Fl W 10s.	9 metres (30 ft)	13712	J4819	10
Cabo Cruz Lighthouse		1871	Cape Cruz; 19°50′28.7″N 77°43′35.8″W	Fl W 5s.	34 metres (112 ft)	13172	J5054	22
Caleta de Carapachibey Lighthouse		1983	Maisí; 21°26′53.7″N 82°55′28.8″W	Fl W 7.5s.	56 metres (184 ft)	13580	J5138	17
Cabo Lucrecia Lighthouse		1868	Banes; 21°04′18.6″N 75°37′13.1″W	Fl W 10s.	40 metres (130 ft)	12912	J4958	25
Canasi Lighthouse	Image	n/a	Santa Cruz del Norte; 23°08′47.4″N 81°48′01.4″W	Fl W 7s.	125 metres (410 ft)	12613	4867.5	15
Cabo San Antonio Lighthouse	Image	1850	Cape San Antonio; 21°52′02.5″N 84°57′04.5″W	Fl (2) W 10s.	31 metres (102 ft)	12436	J4820	18
Castillo del Morro Lighthouse		1845	Havana; 23°09′01.4″N 82°21′26.3″W	Fl (2) W 15s.	44 metres (144 ft)	12580	J4857	26
Cayo Bahia de Cadiz Lighthouse	Image	1862	Villa Clara Province; 23°12′20.2″N 80°28′54.3″W	Fl (3) W 15s.	Villa Clara Province; 54 metres (177 ft)	12676	J4888	21
Cayo Blanco de Casilda Lighthouse		n/a	Sancti Spíritus Province; 21°35′59.7″N 79°35′50.1″W	Fl W 7s.	14 metres (46 ft)	13380	J5090	10
Cayo Breton Lighthouse		1930	Ciego de Ávila Province; 21°07′11.3″N 79°26′57.1″W	Fl W 10s.	33 metres (108 ft)	1344	J5084	12
Cayo Buenavista Lighthouse		1930	Pinar del Río Province; 22°24′06.0″N 84°26′40.7″W	Fl W 5s.	33 metres (108 ft)	12460	J4826	6
Cayo Cachiboca Lighthouse		1930	Camagüey Province; 20°40′42.3″N 78°45′01.2″W	Fl W 15s.	34 metres (112 ft)	13340	J5077	10
Cayo Caiman Grande de Santa María Lighthouse	Image	1955	Cayo Santa María; 22°41′06.0″N 78°53′01.2″W	Fl W 5s.	48 metres (157 ft)	12780	J4916	28
Cayo Conflites Lighthouse	Image	n/a	Camagüey Province; 22°11′10.7″N 77°39′40.0″W	Fl W 7.5s.	23 metres (75 ft)	12804	J4922	12
Cayo Cruz del Padre Lighthouse	Image	1862	Matanzas Province; 23°16′58.4″N 80°53′55.0″W	Fl W 7s.	25 metres (82 ft)	12672	J4886	12
Cayo Diana Lighthouse		1847 est.	Matanzas Province; 23°09′52.9″N 81°06′10.4″W	Fl W 8s.	15 metres (49 ft)	12660	J	10
Cayo Fragoso Lighthouse		1930 est.	Villa Clara Province; 22°48′27.0″N 79°34′38.2″W	Fl W 15s.	21 metres (69 ft)	12716	J4900	10
Cayo Guano del Este Lighthouse	Image	n/a	Matanzas Province; 21°39′49.2″N 81°02′23.7″W	Fl (29 W 15s.	54 metres (177 ft)	13536	J5102	19
Cayo Jaula Lighthouse		n/a	Ciego de Ávila Province; 22°34′10.4″N 78°30′52.1″W	Fl W 10s.	21 metres (69 ft)	12788	J4917	10
Cayo Jutas Lighthouse		1902	Pinar del Río Province; 22°42′55.5″N 84°01′21.1″W	L Fl W 15s.	43 metres (141 ft)	12484	J4828	22
Cayo Moa Grande Lighthouse		n/a	Holguín Province; 20°41′40.0″N 74°54′24.4″W	Fl W 10s.	14 metres (46 ft)	12980	J5012	12
Cayo Monterrey Lighthouse		n/a	Mayabeque Province; 22°20′10.7″N 82°20′42.2″W	Fl W 10s.	11 metres (36 ft)	13656	J5160	14
Cayo Paredon Grande Lighthouse	Image	1859	Ciego de Ávila Province; 22°28′56.0″N 78°09′58.0″W	Fl (3) W 15s.	48 metres (157 ft)	12800	J4918	27
Cayo Piedras del Norte Lighthouse	Image	1857	Matanzas Province; 23°14′34.7″N 81°07′13.5″W	Fl W 10s.	24 metres (79 ft)	12648	J4879	10
Darsena del Barlovento Lighthouse	Image	n/a	La Habana Province; 23°05′33.4″N 82°29′35.5″W	Fl W 7s.	36 metres (118 ft)	12564	J4848	10
Havana Inner Harbor Range No. 1 Rear Lighthouse		n/a	La Habana Province; 23°08′04.3″N 82°19′27.6″W	Q Y	18 metres (59 ft)	12592	J4860.1	9
Havana Inner Harbor Range No. 2 Rear Lighthouse		n/a	La Habana Province; 23°07′47.4″N 82°19′39.9″W	Iso Y 10s.	19 metres (62 ft)	12598	J4859.1	10
Morro Santiago de Cuba Lighthouse	Image	1923	Santiago de Cuba Province; 19°58′03.3″N 75°52′06.7″W	Fl (2) W 10s.	82 metres (269 ft)	13112	J5046	27
Playa Giron Lighthouse		n/a	Matanzas Province; 22°03′56.6″N 81°02′21.7″W	Fl W 15s.	20 metres (66 ft)	13538	J5102	10
Puerto del Mariel Lighthouse		n/a	Artemisa Province; 23°01′20.4″N 82°45′37.8″W	Fl W 12s.	41 metres (135 ft)	12552	J4846	11
Puerto de Vita Lighthouse	Image	1908 est.	Holguín Province; 21°05′48.1″N 75°57′42.2″W	Fl W 10s.	35 metres (115 ft)	12900	J4952	10
Punta Caleta Lighthouse		1930 est.	Guantánamo Province; 20°03′59.9″N 74°17′47.1″W	Fl W 10s.	45 metres (148 ft)	13012	J5020	10
Punta de los Colorados Lighthouse	Image	1091	Cienfuegos Province; 22°02′02.3″N 80°26′36.4″W	Fl W 5s.	25 metres (82 ft)	13468	J5094	23
Punta Gobernadora	Image	1956	Pinar del Río Province; 22°59′40.4″N 83°12′56.9″W	Fl W 6s.	33 metres (108 ft)	12512	j4836	27
Punta Liberal Lighthouse		n/a	Holguín Province; 20°45′01.7″N 75°28′54.6″W	Fl W 10s.	17 metres (56 ft)	12948	J4975	7
Punta Maisí Lighthouse	Image	1862	Maisí; 20°14′38.1″N 74°08′34.7″W	Fl W 5s.	37 metres (121 ft)	13008	J5018	27
Punta Maternillos Lighthouse	Image	1850	Camagüey Province; 21°39′47.3″N 77°08′29.2″W	Fl W 15s.	53 metres (174 ft)	12808	J4926	23
Punta Maya Lighthouse	Image	1988	Matanzas Province; 23°05′40.5″N 81°28′28.2″W	Fl W 8s.	34 metres (112 ft)	12620	J4872	17
Punta Mayari Lighthouse	Image	n/a	Holguín Province; 20°47′30.8″N 75°31′28.1″W	Fl W 6s.	35 metres (115 ft)	12920	J4962	10
Punta Piedra del Mangle Lighthouse	Image	1930 est.	Las Tunas Province; 21°15′10.3″N 76°18′48.8″W	Fl W 10s.	23 metres (75 ft)	12892	J4946	10
Punta Praticos Lighthouse	Image	1864 est.	Camagüey Province; 21°36′19.2″N 77°05′54.5″W	Fl W 10s.	10 metres (33 ft)	12812	J4928	6
Punta Rasa Lighthouse	Image	n/a	Holguín Province; 21°09′00.9″N 76°07′50.0″W	Fl W 15s.	34 metres (112 ft)	12894	J4948	12
Punta Roma Lighthouse		n/a	Las Tunas Province; 21°23′27.8″N 76°48′47.8″W	Fl W 12s.	13 metres (43 ft)	12872	J4942	10
Punta Seboruco Lighthouse	Image	1930 est.	Matanzas Province; 23°09′12.3″N 81°36′24.8″W	Fl W 15s.	35 metres (115 ft)	12616	J4868	10
Rio Jaruco Lighthouse	Image	n/a	Mayabeque Province; 23°10′51.1″N 82°00′37.0″W	Fl W 10	17 metres (56 ft)	12612	J4867	11
Rio Santa Ana Lighthouse	Image	n/a	Artemisa Province; 23°03′19.9″N 82°32′29.9″W	Fl W 10s.	56 metres (184 ft)	12562	J4847.6	15
Rio Yaguanabo Lighthouse	Image	n/a	Cienfuegos Province; 21°51′27.1″N 80°12′26.7″W	Fl W 10s.	58 metres (190 ft)	13646	J5093	15
Surgidero de Batabanó Lighthouse		1847 est.	Mayabeque Province; 22°41′15.7″N 82°17′51.8″W	Fl W 10s.	31 metres (102 ft)	13647	J5166	7

== See also ==
- Lists of lighthouses and lightvessels
