= Colorados Archipelago =

Chain of isles and cays on Cuba's north-western coast

Coordinates: 22°24′N 84°25′W

Location of Colorados Archipelago in Cuba

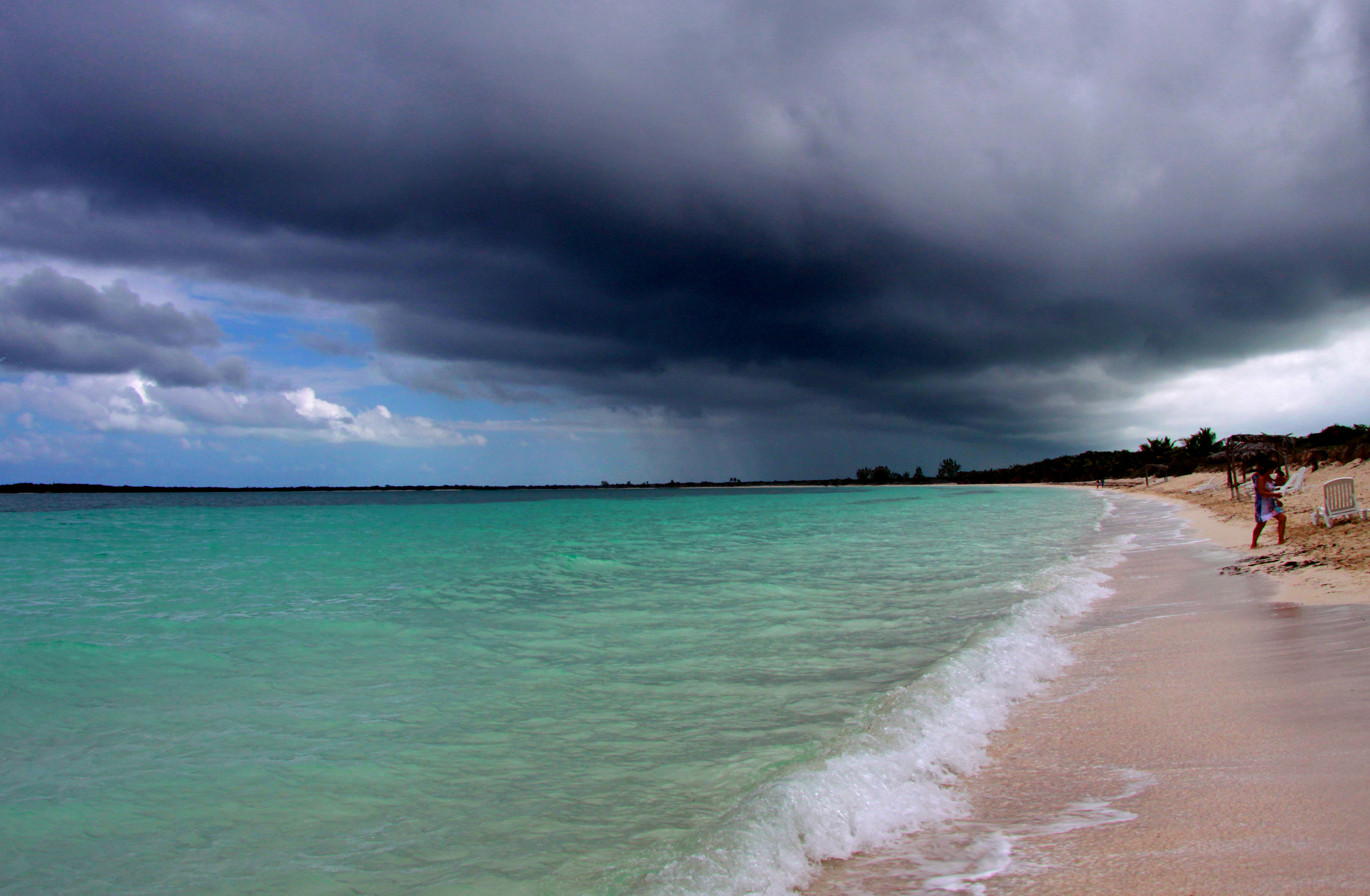
Cayo Las Brujas beach in Ciego de Ávila, Cuba

Los Colorados Archipelago (Spanish: Archipiélago de los Colorados, also called Archipiélago de Santa Isabel and Archipiélago de Guaniguanico) is a chain of isles and cays on Cuba's north-western coast. A coral reef extending at least the length of the archipelago separates it from the Gulf of Mexico.

== Geography ==
The archipelago is approximately 100 kilometres (62 mi) long and is composed of 160 small cays, including Cayo Levisa, Cayo Arenas, Cayo Jutias, Punta Tabaco, Cabezo Seco, Cayo Paraiso, Cayo Buenavista, Banco Sancho Pardo, Cayo Rapado Grande, and Cayo Alacranes. It is located off the northern coast of Pinar del Río Province, facing the Gulf of Mexico, between Honda Bay (north of the community of Bahia Honda) and Cape San Antonio on the Guanahacabibes Peninsula. It is divided into two sections: western and east.

A barrier coral reef to its north, 120 miles (190 km) long, extends the entire length of the archipelago, separating it from the Gulf of Mexico. The channel between the two is navigable throughout.

== Reef ==
The reef covers an area of 165 square kilometres (64 sq mi). It is relatively healthy due to its isolated location and the low population of coastal communities.

Stephanocoenia intersepta is the most abundant coral species, which is not the case of any other known Cuban reef.

== Economic activity ==
The sea surrounding the sparsely populated islands is used mainly for fishing, with commercial catches of lobsters, sponges, oysters, red snapper and tuna. Small fishing vessels targeting snappers, groupers and jacks present a danger of overfishing.

Tourism is also developing on cays such as Cayo Levisa, where white sand beaches, snorkeling and diving sites attract tourists.

== Conservation ==
In 2022, Cuba made the Este del Archipiélago de Los Colorados (East Los Colorados Archipelago) a Marine Protected Area (MPA), 291 square miles (750 km^{2}) "of vibrant mangrove forests, seagrass beds, and climate-resilient corals - plus spawning sites for several economically important species of groupers and mutton, cubera, and gray snappers", as well as the endangered hawksbill sea turtle. Fishing is prohibited in a section of the MPA called the Corona San Carlos Wildlife Refuge, with an area of 272 square kilometres (105 sq mi).

== Table of major islands ==
Island	Capital	More islands	Area (km^{2}, Census 2012)	Population (Census 2012)	
Banco Sancho Pardo			0.1	0	
Cayo Alacranes	Punta Casiguas	Medano, Punta Alcaranes	4.4	0	
Cayo Buenavista	Punta Del Oeste	Punta del este	14.9	0	
Cayo Ines de Soto	Playuelas	La Pasa de la legua, Punta Brava, cayo redondo, Cayo Legua, cayo Pescador, Punta Hicacel, Cayo Prieto, Punta Boquerones	6.23	0	
Cayo Jutías	Playa Santa Lucia		4	0	
Cayo Levisa	Cayo Levisa	Punta Bailarina, Playa Sur	2.5	5	
Cayo Rapado Grande	Playa Cedro	Punta Vinagrera, Punta Remagillal, Punta Perche, La Playita	5.47	0	
Cayos Punta Tabaco	Cayo diego	Cayo De Limones	2.21	0	
Other islands	Cayo Curoita	Cayo Catalanes, Cayo Dios, Cayo Arenas, Cayo Cabezo Seco, Cayo Paraiso	3.4	0	
	Colorados Archipelago	pueblo Cayo Levisa	Cayo Jutias	43.3	5

== See also ==
- Geography of Cuba
- Antilles
