= Cayo Conuco =

Cayo Conuco may refer to:

- Pinar_del_Río#Cayo_Conuco, a municipality in Pinar del Rio, Cuba
- Caibarién#Cayo_Conuco, a small island located seven kilometres from Caibarién, Cuba
