= Levisa =

Levisa may refer to:

== Geography ==
- Levisa Bay, a bay in Holguín Province, Cuba
- Levisa Fork, a river in Virginia and Kentucky, United States
- Levisa (Cuban river), a river in Holguín Province, Cuba
- Levisa-Nicaro (or Nicaro-Levisa), a town in Holguín Province, Cuba
- Cayo Levisa, a cay in Pinar del Río Province, Cuba
- La Levisa, Vega Alta, Cuba. (La Lebisa in Spanish)

== People ==
- Fedor Fedorovich Levisa (1767–1824), a Russian lieutenant general of the Napoleonic Wars
