= Cape Maisí =

Cape at the eastern extremity of Cuba

Cabo Maisí
- Cape
- Location within Cuba
- Coordinates: 20°14′38.1″N 74°8′34.7″W
- Location: Guantanamo Province
- Water bodies: Caribbean Sea, Atlantic Ocean

Cape Maisí or Cape Maysí is a cape at the eastern extremity of Cuba, projecting into the Windward Passage. It lies in the municipality of Maisí, Guantánamo Province.

== See also ==
- Punta Maisí Lighthouse
- Cape San Antonio
