= Faro del Castillo de los Tres Reyes del Morro =

Lighthouse in Havana, Cuba

Faro Castillo del Morro
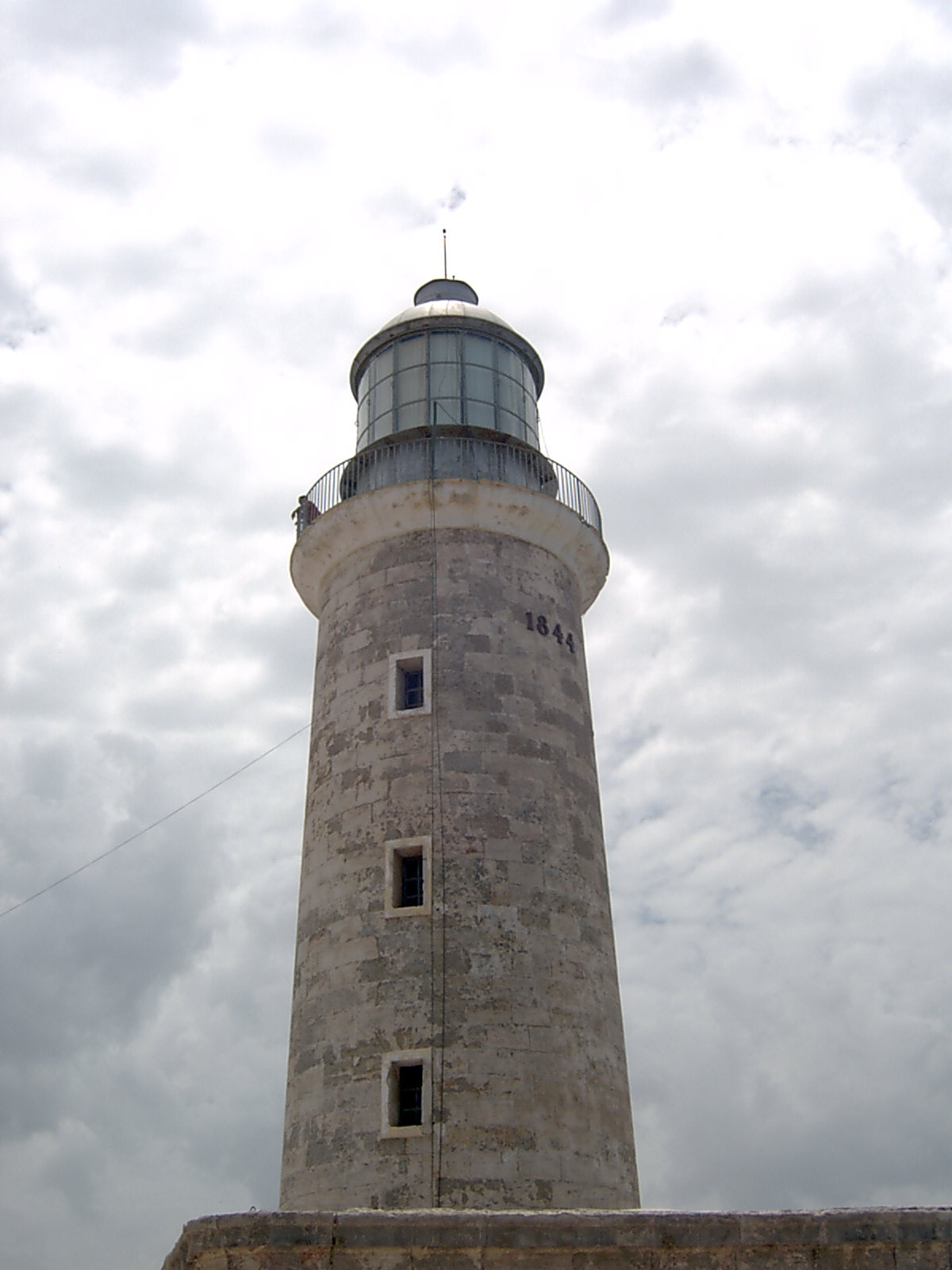
- Lighthouse of the El Morro Castle (2006)
- Location: Havana; Cuba
- Coordinates: 23.150227°N 82.357204°W

Tower
- Constructed: 1764 (first); 1818 (second)
- Foundation: 1764
- Construction: stone masonry tower
- Height: 25 metres (82 ft)
- Shape: culindrical tower with balcony and lantern
- Markings: unpainted stone tower, grey lantern
- Operator: Parque Histórico Militar El Morro

Light
- First lit: 1845 (current)
- Focal height: 44 metres (144 ft)
- Range: 26 nmi (48 km; 30 mi)
- Characteristic: Fl (2) W 15s.

Faro Castillo del Morro is a lighthouse located in Havana, Cuba. It was built in 1845 on the ramparts of the Castillo de los Tres Reyes Magos del Morro, an old fortress guarding the harbor of Havana. The lighthouse has a height of 25 metres (82 ft), a focal height of 44 metres (144 ft) and displays two white flashes every 15 seconds (Fl.(2) 15s).

== History ==
This lighthouse was built in 1845 taking the place of the previous lighthouse system of 1820 with a twentyfour meter range. The lighthouse system was bought in the French Industrial Exposition of 1844, has sixteen lenses and a thirty three meter range. This was the first of the over ten lighthouse built during the last decades of the capitancy general of Cuba period.

== See also ==
- List of buildings in Havana
- Havana Harbor
- List of lighthouses in Cuba
