= Punta Maisí Lighthouse =

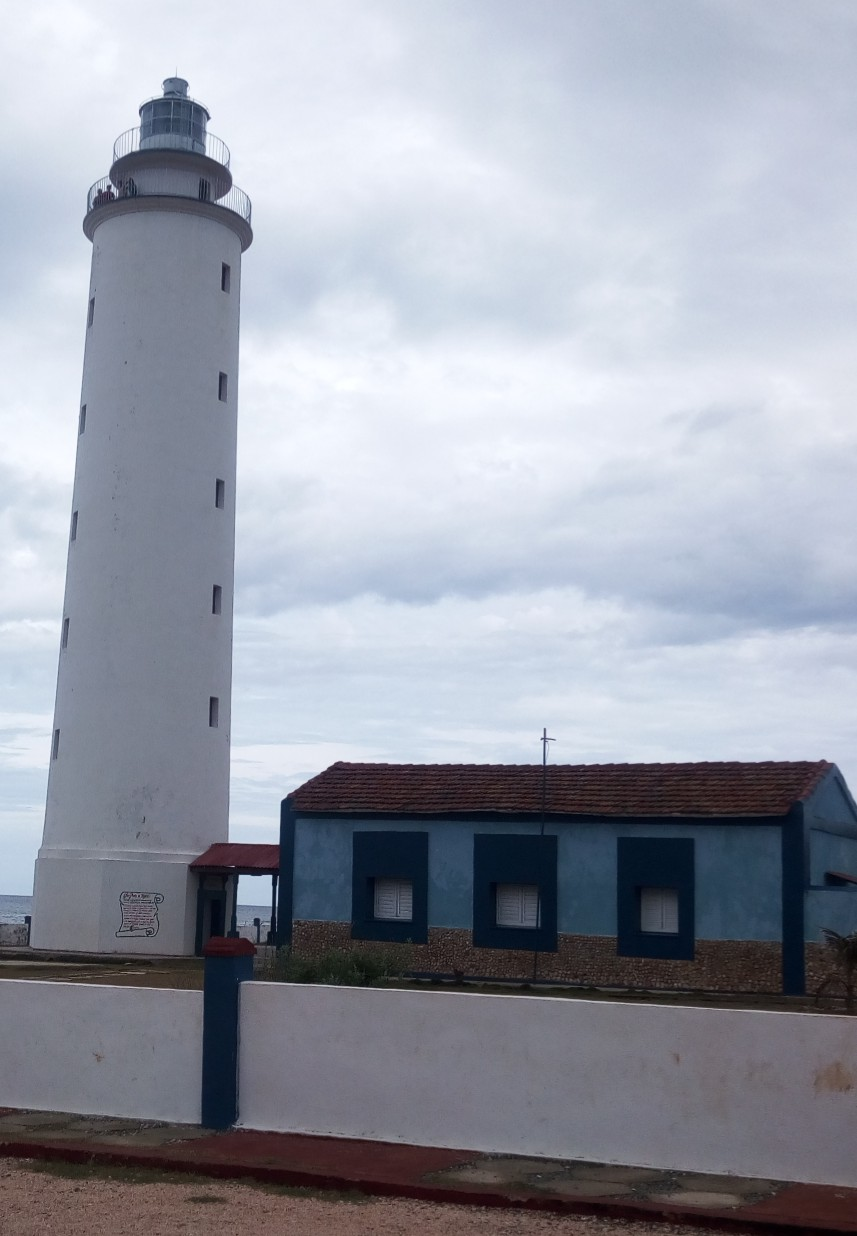
- Location: Maisí; Cuba
- Coordinates: 20°14′38.1″N 74°08′34.7″W

Tower
- Constructed: 1862
- Construction: stone tower
- Height: 31 metres (102 ft)
- Shape: cylindrical tower with balcony and double lantern
- Markings: white tower, grey metallic lantern
- Power source: mains electricity

Light
- Focal height: 37 metres (121 ft)
- Range: 27 nautical miles (50 km; 31 mi)
- Characteristic: Fl W 5s.
- Cuba no.: CU-0599

Punta Maisí Lighthouse is a Cuban lighthouse located in Maisí, a municipality of Guantánamo Province. It lies in Cape Maisí, the easternmost point of Cuba.

== See also ==
- List of lighthouses in Cuba
- Cabo San Antonio Lighthouse, the westernmost in Cuba
