= Cabo San Antonio Lighthouse =

Lighthouse in Pinar del Río Province, Cuba

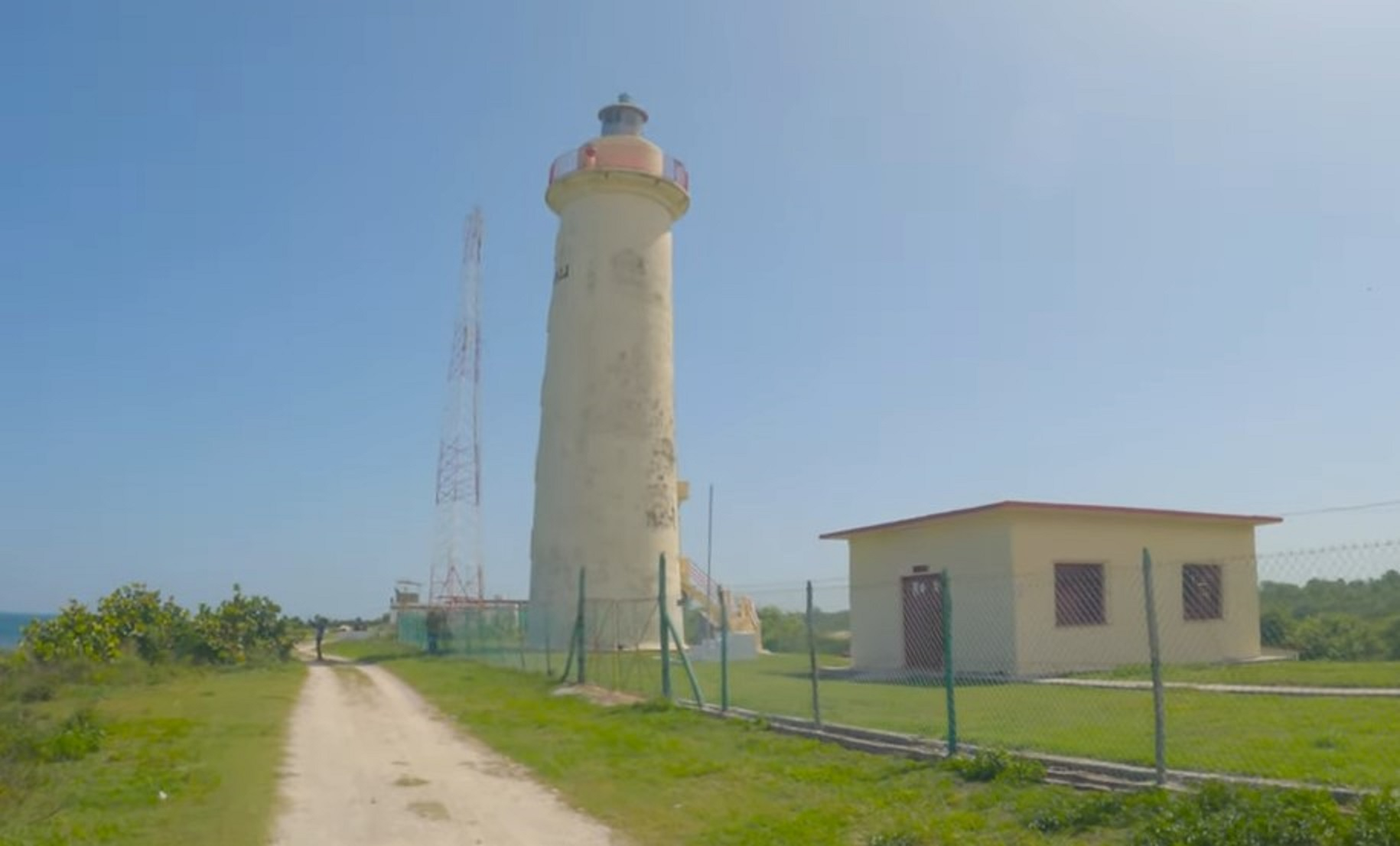
- Location: Cabo San Antonio; Cuba
- Coordinates: 21°52′02.5″N 84°57′04.5″W

Tower
- Constructed: 1850
- Construction: masonry tower
- Height: 23 metres (75 ft)
- Shape: cylindrical tower with balcony and lantern
- Markings: white tower, grey metallic lantern
- Power source: mains electricity

Light
- Focal height: 31 metres (102 ft)
- Range: 22 nautical miles (41 km; 25 mi)
- Characteristic: Fl(2) W 10s
- Cuba no.: CU-0001

Cabo San Antonio Lighthouse is a Cuban lighthouse located in Sandino, a municipality of Pinar del Río Province. It lies in Cape San Antonio, on Guanahacabibes Peninsula, the westernmost point of Cuba.

According to the International Hydrographic Organization, the line between the lighthouse at Cabo Catoche on the north tip of the Yucatán Peninsula in Mexico and the Cabo San Antonio Lighthouse marks the division between the Caribbean Sea to the south and Gulf of Mexico to the north.

== History ==
The Cabo San Antonio Lighthouse was built at the westernmost point of Cuba in 1850 during the Spanish colonial period, under the orders of the Spanish governor Federico Roncali, whose name remained associated with the lighthouse for many years. Its construction was completed on 15 September 1850, and it entered service immediately, becoming one of the most prominent navigational landmarks in the area due to its strategic location at the junction of maritime routes between the Gulf of Mexico and the Caribbean Sea.

== See also ==
- List of lighthouses in Cuba
- Punta Maisí Lighthouse, the easternmost in Cuba
