= Cayo Fragoso Lighthouse =

Lighthouse in Cayo Fragoso, Cuba

- Location: Cayo Fragoso; Cuba
- Coordinates: 22°48′27.0″N 79°34′38.2″W

Tower
- Constructed: 1930 (first)
- Construction: metal skeletal tower
- Height: 18 metres (59 ft)
- Shape: square pyramidal tower
- Markings: white tower

Light
- Focal height: 21 metres (69 ft)
- Range: 10 nautical miles (19 km; 12 mi)
- Characteristic: Fl W 15s.
- Cuba no.: CU-0284

Cayo Fragoso Lighthouse is a Cuban lighthouse located in Cayo Fragoso, a resort island that is part of the Sabana-Camagüey Archipelago. Administratively, the island belongs to the municipality of Caibarién, Villa Clara Province.

== See also ==
- List of lighthouses in Cuba
- Cayo Caiman Grande de Santa María Lighthouse
