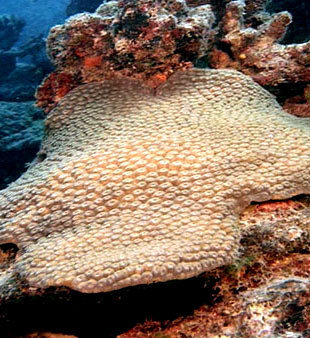
- Stephanocoenia intersepta

Scientific classification
- Kingdom: Animalia
- Phylum: Cnidaria
- Subphylum: Anthozoa
- Class: Hexacorallia
- Order: Scleractinia
- Suborder: Astrocoeiina
- Family: Astrocoeniidae; Koby, 1890

Genera
- See text

= Astrocoeniidae =

Family of corals

Astrocoeniidae is a family of stony corals. The family is distributed across the tropical and subtropical oceans worldwide.

== Description ==
Astrocoeniids include both hermatypic and ahermatypic (reef-building) colonial corals, both with and without symbiotic zooxanthellae. The family is made up of both branching and encrusting species which can range in size from less than 5 cm (2.0 in) to more than 30 m (98 ft) across.

== Species ==
The World Register of Marine Species includes the following genera and species in the family:

- Astrocoenia Milne Edwards & Haime, 1848 †
  - Astrocoenia blanfordi Duncan, 1880 †
  - Astrocoenia cellulata Duncan, 1880 †
  - Astrocoenia dachiardii Duncan, 1873 †
  - Astrocoenia decaphylla Duncan, 1863 †
  - Astrocoenia gibbosa Duncan, 1880 †
- Palauastrea Yabe & Sugiyama, 1941
  - Palauastrea ramosa Yabe & Sugiyama, 1941
- Stephanocoenia Milne Edwards & Haime, 1848
  - Stephanocoenia incrustans Duncan, 1873 †
  - Stephanocoenia intersepta (Lamarck, 1816) - synonym, Stephanocoenia michelini
  - Stephanocoenia maxima Duncan, 1880 †
  - Stephanocoenia microtuberculata Duncan, 1880 †
  - Stephanocoenia reussi Duncan, 1868 †
  - Stephanocoenia tenuis Duncan, 1863 †
- Stylocoenia Milne Edwards & Haime, 1849 †
  - Stylocoenia maxima Duncan, 1880 †
  - Stylocoenia ranikoti Duncan, 1880 †
  - Stylocoenia taurinensis Michelin, 1842 †
- Stylocoeniella Yabe & Sugiyama, 1935
  - Stylocoeniella armata (Ehrenberg, 1834)
  - Stylocoeniella cocosensis Veron, 1990
  - Stylocoeniella guentheri (Bassett-Smith, 1890)
  - Stylocoeniella nikei Benzoni & Pichon, 2004
