= Cayo Caiman Grande de Santa María Lighthouse =

Lighthouse in Villa Clara, Cuba

Cayo Caiman Grande de Santa Maria Lighthouse
- Location: Cayo Santa María; Cuba
- Coordinates: 22°41′06.0″N 78°53′01.2″W

Tower
- Constructed: 1909 (first)
- Foundation: concrete base
- Construction: cast iron tower
- Height: 32 metres (105 ft)
- Shape: tapered cylindrical tower with balcony and lantern
- Markings: white and red horizontal band tower, silver metalli lantern

Light
- First lit: 1955 (current)
- Focal height: 48 metres (157 ft)
- Lens: first-order Fresnel lens
- Range: 28 nautical miles (52 km; 32 mi)
- Characteristic: Fl W 5s.
- Cuba no.: CU-0325

Cayo Caiman Grande de Santa María Lighthouse is a Cuban lighthouse located on Cayo Santa María, a resort island of the municipality of Caibarién, Villa Clara Province.

The resort island is off Cuba's north-central coast in the Jardines del Rey archipelago.

== See also ==
- List of lighthouses in Cuba
- Cayo Fragoso Lighthouse
