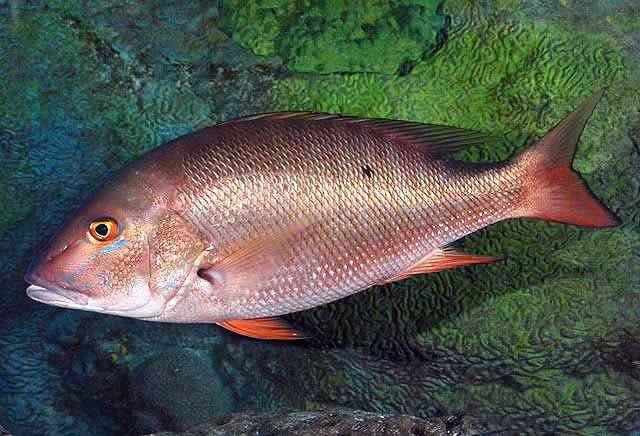

Conservation status
- Near Threatened (IUCN 3.1)

Scientific classification
- Kingdom: Animalia
- Phylum: Chordata
- Class: Actinopterygii
- Order: Acanthuriformes
- Family: Lutjanidae
- Genus: Lutjanus
- Species: L. analis

Binomial name
- Lutjanus analis (G. Cuvier, 1828)
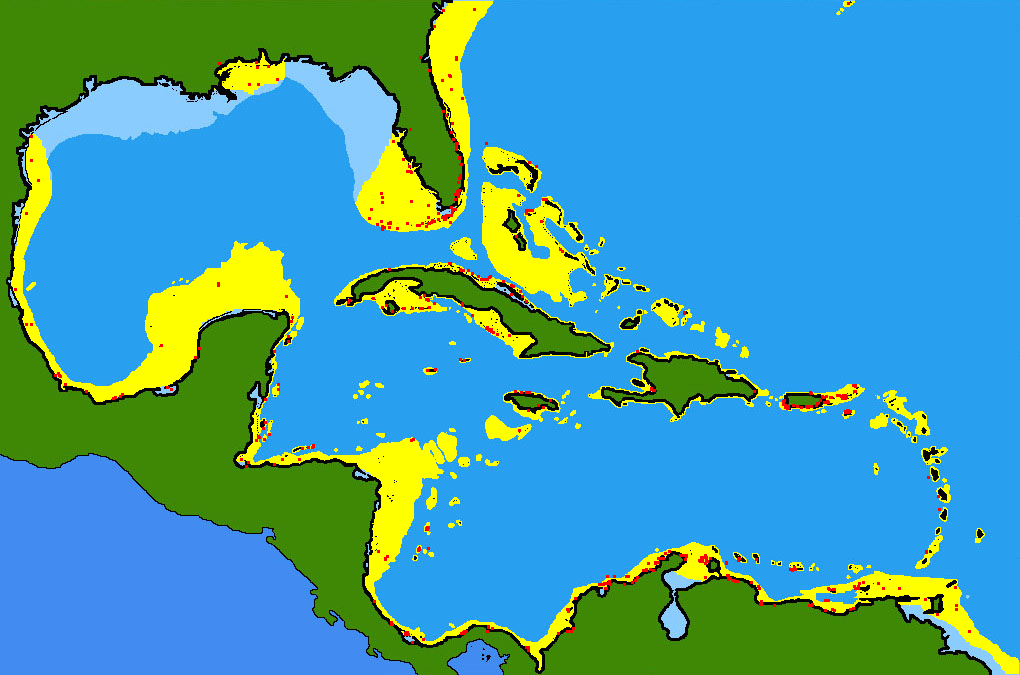

Synonyms
- Mesoprion analis G. Cuvier, 1828; Mesoprion sobra (G. Cuvier, 1828); Mesoprion isodon (G. Cuvier, 1828); Mesoprion rosaceus Poey, 1870

= Mutton snapper =

Species of fish

The mutton snapper (Lutjanus analis) is a species of marine ray-finned fish, a snapper belonging to the family Lutjanidae. It is found in the Western Atlantic Ocean.

== Taxonomy ==
The mutton snapper was first formally described in 1828 by the French zoologist Georges Cuvier with the type locality given as Santo Domingo in the Dominican Republic. The specific name refers to the red, sharply pointed anal fin.

== Description ==
The mutton snapper has a moderately deep, almond shaped body, with a nearly lunate caudal fin. The dorsal fin is almost two lobed and it has a sharply pointed anal fin. The pectoral fin is long, extending just past the origin of the anal fin. Both pairs of nostrils are simple holes. It has small eyes, a straight dorsal profile on the forehead and comparatively large terminal mouth with a protrusible upper jaw which is mostly covered by the cheek bone when the mouth is closed. The jaws are equipped with 1-2 tows of conical teeth with some of the outer row being enlarged into canine-like teeth. The vomerine teeth are arranged in a chevron shaped patch with another patch of teeth on each side of the palate. The dorsal fin has 10-11 spines and 13-14 soft rays while the anal fin contains 3 spines and 7-8 soft rays. The pectoral fin has 15-17, typically 16, rays. This is a colourful species with olive green on the back and upper flanks shading to reddish the lower flanks and abdomen. There is a black spot on the between the lateral line and the spiny part of the dorsal fin. There is a pair of blue stripes beneath the eyes and the higher one continues on to the operculum. The caudal fin has a black margin. When the fish is resting it has 10 to 12 dark vertical bars on the body, these merge into a solid colour when the fish is swimming. The fins are red. Small juveniles, around 15 mm (0.59 in) in length, have transparent fins and yellowish brown bands on the body, larger juveniles are marked with yellow bands on their body and a more prominent black spot than the adults. This fish attains a maximum total length of 94 cm (37 in), although 50 cm (20 in) is more typical, and the maximum published weight is 15.6 kg (34 lb).

== Distribution and habitat ==
The mutton snapper is native to the western Atlantic Ocean where it occurs from Massachusetts in the north to Brazil in the south. It is commonest in the warmer waters of Florida, the Bahamas, the Caribbean Sea and in the Gulf of Mexico. This species occurs in comparatively shallow clear waters at depths from 25 to 95 m (82 to 312 ft) where the water temperature is between 18.9 and 27.8 °C (66.0 and 82.0 °F). The larger adults live in and around offshore reefs and in area of rock rubble, and the juveniles stay in inshore waters where they can be abundant in habitats such as tidal mangrove creeks, canals and shallow protected bays. The juveniles often shelter within turtle grass beds.

== Biology ==
The mutton snapper is a predatory species which changes its diet during its life cycle. The larvae feed on plankton near the surface of the sea, when they settle to live in the turtle grass beds they eat larger items of plankton and small invertebrates. As they grow they begin to feed on crustaceans, gastropods and smaller fishes, like grunts and mullets. They feed throughout the day, picking at prey. The body colour changes depending on the method of feeding, the dark barred pattern being adopted when feeding near the bottom.

The mutton snapper spawns everywhere it is found, although the main spawning area is in the northeastern Caribbean. They gather in large, transient aggregations to spawn. Spawning takes place in February in the Caribbean while in other parts of its range it occurs in the summer. This species spawns at the same place and at the same time relative to the lunar calendar every year. The females release pelagic eggs that are carried by currents. A female can lay as many as 1,400,000 eggs which the males fertilise externally and which hatch 20 hours after fertilisation. Following hatching, the larvae migrate to shallow water environments within 48 hours. When spawning is finished, the adults move to deeper, offshore waters and become sedentary. The lifespan can be as much as forty years.

== Fisheries and conservation ==
The mutton snapper is an important target species for recreational, commercial and artisanal fisheries. The flesh is considered to be of very high quality and commands high prices at markets throughout its range, especially the meat from the cheek and throat of the larger snappers which are regarded as gourmet foods. This species is caught using hook and line, seines, gill nets, bottom longlines and traps, it is also taken by spearfishing. In Florida it is a very popular with the recreational fisheries, most landing at Cape Canaveral.

This species forms predictable spawning aggregations rendering it vulnerable to overfishing while the juveniles are also fished for in some areas worsening the effects of overfishing. In the northern part of its range, stock assessments have shown that there has been a decline of over 60% in commercial landings but the stock is not overfished, there has been a reduction in effort. In Cuba, the size of the known spawning aggregation has decreased. Elsewhere, the mutton snapper is subjected to heavy exploitation and considered to be subject to overfishing in parts of Brazil and Colombia. From the information available it is estimated that the biomass of the stock has declined by at least 20% over a period of 30 to 60 years and so it is listed as Near Threatened by the IUCN. It is thought that if current trends continue then it should be expected that the status could worsen to vulnerable. The IUCN has recommended the implementation of precautionary management measures, such as the collection of appropriate fisheries data to gain a clearer understanding of the population structures, as well as the protecting important spawning aggregations.

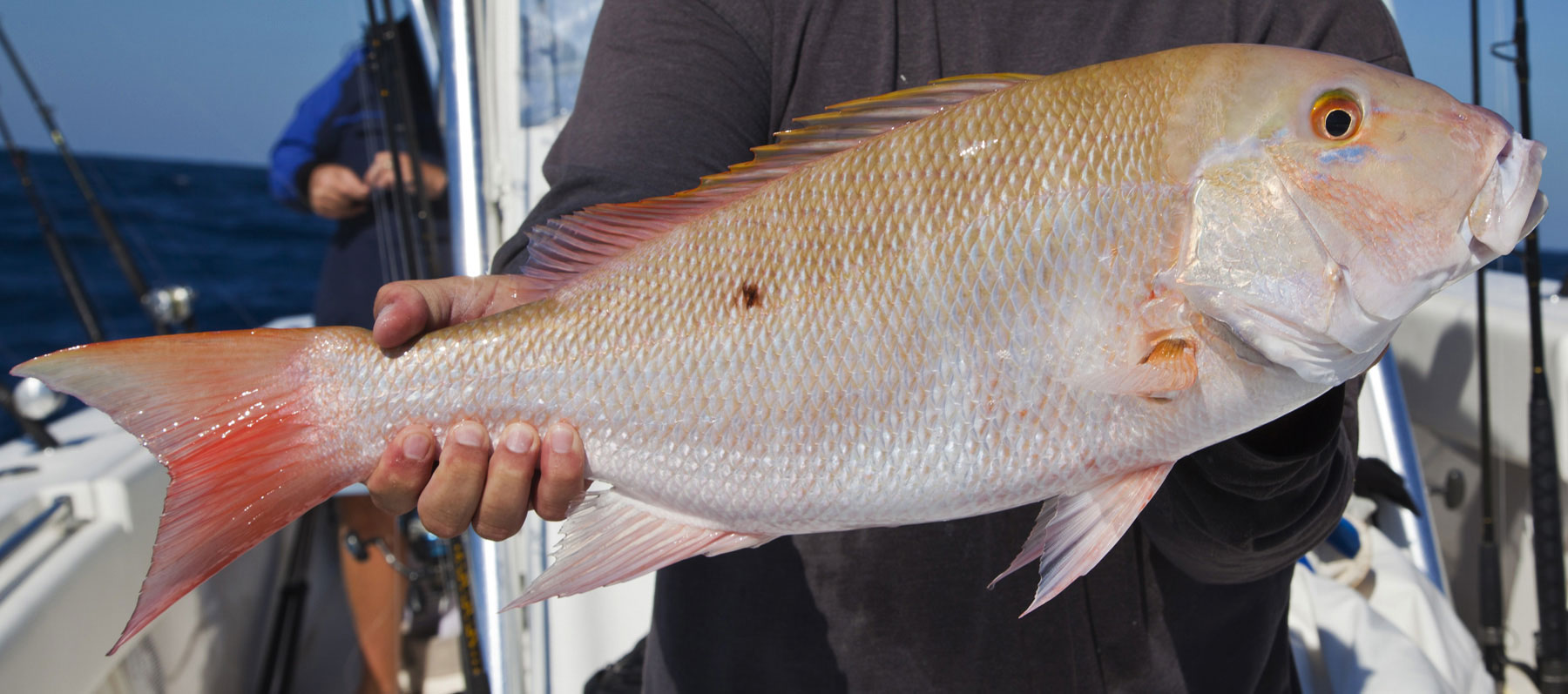

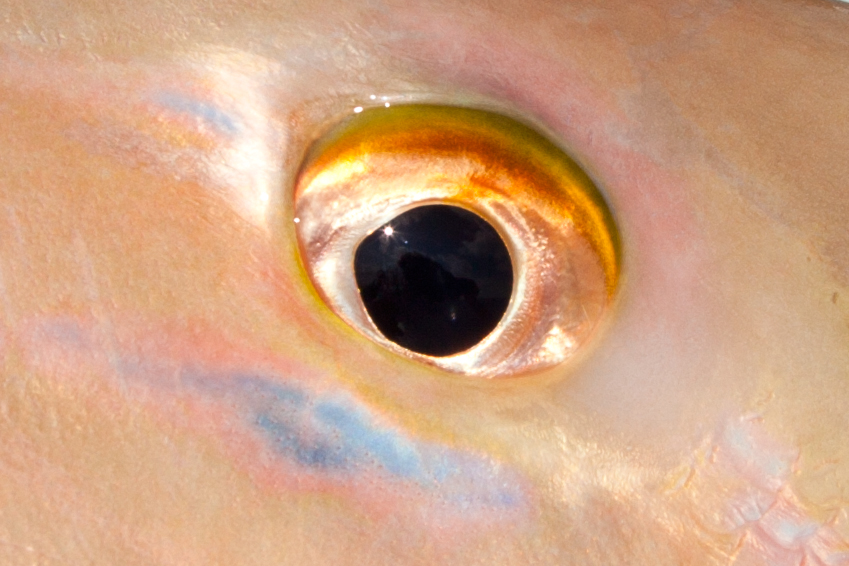
Eye

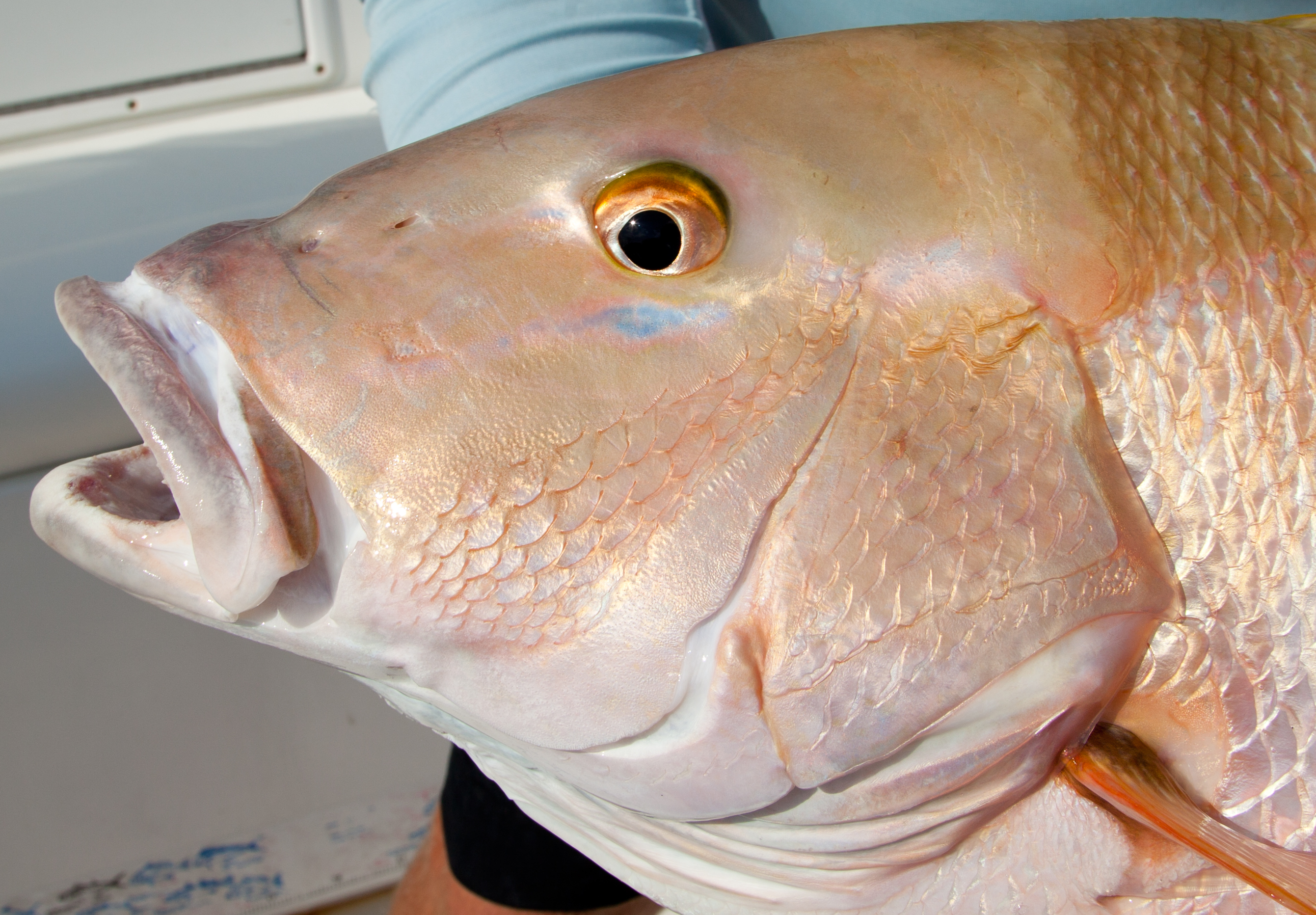
Face
