= Cayo Levisa =

Cay in Pinar del Río Province, Cuba

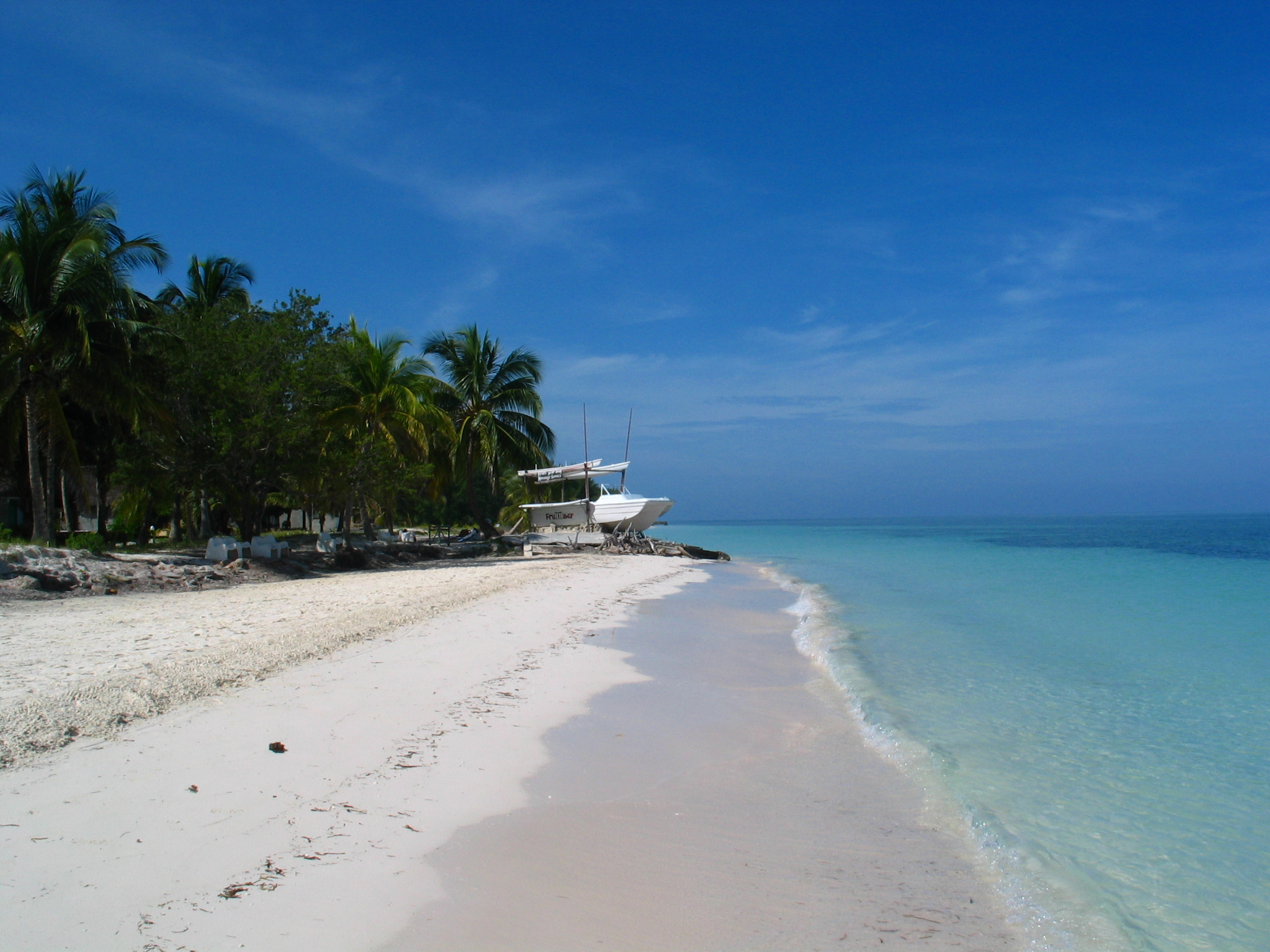
- Interactive map of Cayo Levisa

Geography
- Location: Pinar del Río Province
- Coordinates: 22°53′04″N 83°31′27″W
- Area: 1.5 km^{2} (0.58 sq mi)
- Length: 42 km (26.1 mi)

Administration
- Cuba

Additional information
- Official website: Official website

Cayo Levisa is a cay in Pinar del Río Province, Cuba. Accessible only through boats from Palma Rubia, the white sand beaches on its north coast attract tourism. It has several snorkeling and diving sites. It is part of the Colorados Archipelago coral reef and well known for its black coral.

== Geography ==
The cay is roughly 1.5 km^{2} (150 hectares) in size and 4.2 km long. It is several hundred yards wide in most points, with a maximum width of 750 m and a minimum of 280 m. It is located roughly 150 km west of Havana. Swamps cover more than three quarters of the surface of the island; the south side is inaccessible due to a forest of mangroves.

== Climate ==
The average temperature in Cayo Levisa is between 21 °C and 33 °C

== Coral reefs ==
The Benthic zone of the coral reef was analysed in 2002 and 2003. Foliaceous and calcareous algae cover at least half of the substrate. Live coral cover was 30–40%, with ten dominant species of coral occurring more densely than sponges and gorgonians. Disease was identified in less than 3% of coral colonies, with white plague being the most common disease.

== Tourism ==
According to Rough Guides in 2003, the island is more developed for tourism than nearby Colorados Archipelago islands like the Cayo Jutías. A boat leaves from Palma Rubia at 11 a.m. and returns at 5 p.m. There is a hotel facility on the island made up of 20 cabins, as well as a restaurant and a dive centre. According to a 2006 study, it is the only cay in the archipelago to offer diving, at coral reefs of depth 5 m to 30 m.

== See also ==
- Geography of Cuba
- Geography of North America
