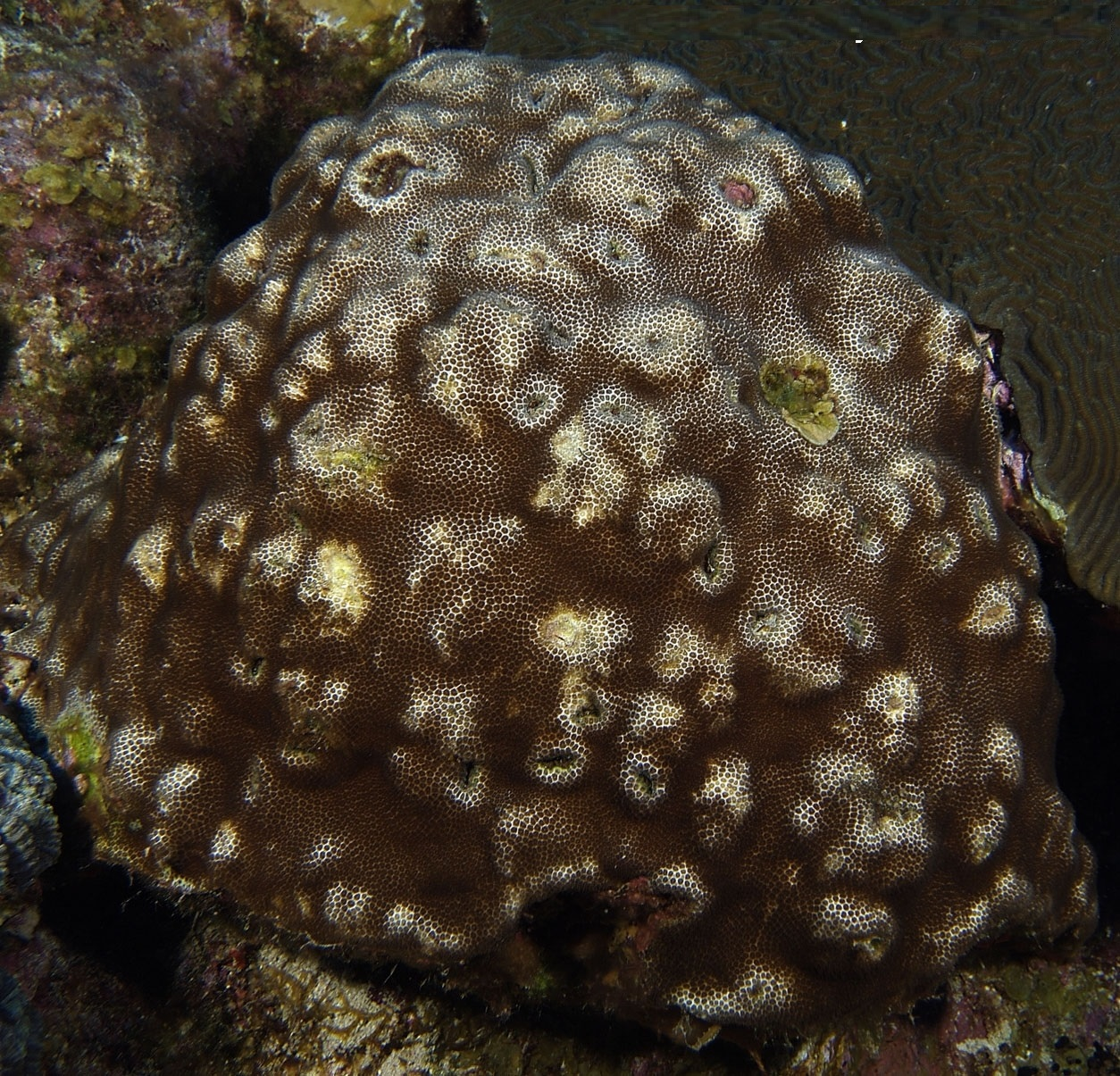

Conservation status
- Near Threatened (IUCN 3.1)

Scientific classification
- Kingdom: Animalia
- Phylum: Cnidaria
- Subphylum: Anthozoa
- Class: Hexacorallia
- Order: Scleractinia
- Family: Astrocoeniidae
- Genus: Stephanocoenia
- Species: S. intersepta

Binomial name
- Stephanocoenia intersepta Esper (1795).

= Stephanocoenia intersepta =

Species of coral

Stephanocoenia intersepta, commonly known as blushing star coral or small eyed star coral, is a species of colonial stony corals in the family Astrocoeniidae. This coral is found in shallow waters in the tropical western Atlantic Ocean and the Caribbean Sea. The IUCN has assessed its status as being Near Threatened

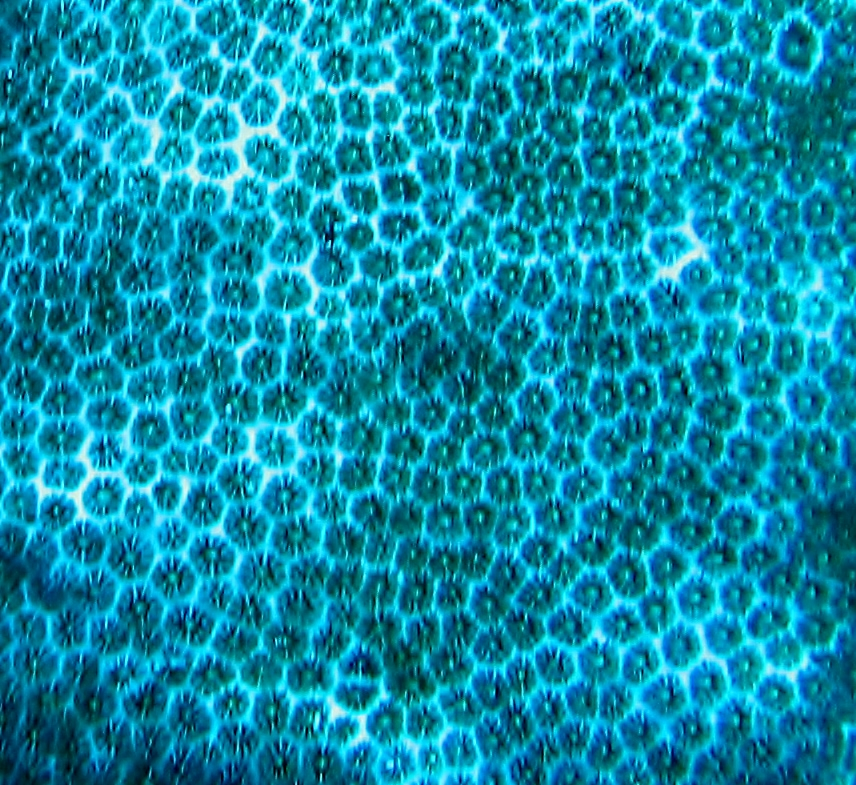

== Description ==
Stephanocoenia intersepta commonly grows in a flattened hemispherical shape. Occasionally misidentified as massive starlet coral (S. siderea), S. intersepta has large, protruding corallites as opposed to S. siderea's retracted corallites. Polyp tentacles are usually extended during the day, contributing to its cream, tan, gray, or brown color. When disturbed, these tentacles retract, changing the color of the coral and giving it the common name blushing star coral.

== Distribution and habitat ==
This coral is found in reefs occupying the majority of the Caribbean Sea, Gulf of Mexico, and Florida Keys. Typically found between depth of 1m and 100m, it has been found as far south as the coast of Brazil.

== Ecology ==
This coral is a zooxanthellate species, which contains single-celled dinoflagellates in its tissues. These are photosynthetic and provide the coral with 70% to 95% of its energy needs. The rest of its needs are supplied by the polyps which trap passing plankton.

Found in most reef communities, the crustose form of this coral is typically found in shallower environments between 5 and 15 meters, while the boulder form is found in deeper communities (10-20m). The average age of maturity is around three to eight years, and average generational age is around 10 years.
