= Jardines de la Reina =

Archipelago in the southern part of Cuba

- IUCN category II (national park)
- Location within Cuba
- Location: Cuba
- Nearest city: Santa Cruz del Sur
- Coordinates: 20°49′N 78°55′W
- Area: 2,170 km^{2} (840 sq mi)

Jardines de la Reina (English: Gardens of the Queen) is an archipelago in the southern part of Cuba, in the provinces of Camagüey and Ciego de Ávila.

It was named by Christopher Columbus to honour the Queen of Spain, Isabella I of Castile. In 1996 a marine reserve was established covering a large swath of the archipelago. In 2010, Jardines de la Reina was established as a national park (Spanish: Parque Nacional Jardines de la Reina). With an area of 2,170 km^{2} (840 sq mi), it is one of Cuba's largest protected areas.

== Geography ==
It is located in the Caribbean Sea, between the Gulf of Ana Maria (north-west), Gulf of Guacanayabo (south) and Caballones Channel (west). It extends on a general north-west to south-east direction, paralleling the Cuban coast for 150 km (93 mi) from Cayo Breton to Cayos Mordazo. Cuba's second largest archipelago (smaller only than Jardines del Rey), it is formed by more than 600 cays and islands. Other cays in the archipelago include Caguamas, Cayos Cinco Balas, Cayo Anclitas, Cayo Algodon Grande, Cayos Pingues and Cayo Granada. Part of the archipelago is also known as Laberinto de las Doce Leguas (The Labyrinth of the Twelve Leagues).

The underwater landscapes include canyons, pinnacles and caves. Healthy mangroves, sponges and black corals cover the reef.

== Table of major islands ==
Island	Other cays and features	Area (km^{2}) (Census 2012)	Population (Census 2012)
Cayo Algodon Grande		3.70	0
Cayo Anclitas	Punta Piloto	4.50	0
Cayo Breton		6.70	0
Cayo Caballones		16.50	0
Cayo Cabeza Del Este		6.36	0
Cayo Caguamas		7.86	0
Cayo Grande		26.80	0
Cayos Ana Maria	Cayo Tio Joaquin, Arenas, Balandras, Ana Maria, Caoba, Campito, Guasimas, Flamenco, Dos Hermanos, Guinea, Obispo, Laguna, Encantado, Joroba,	14.76	0
Cayos Bahia de Casilda	Guayo, Tobacco, Puga, Machos	1.00	0
Cayos Cinco Balas		13.50	0
Cayos Granada	Corua, Sardines, Caoba, Guasa, Rancho Viejo, Inglesitos, Pilon	16.63	0
Cayos Media Luna	Culebra, Loma, Rabihorcado	7.10	0
Cayos Mordazo	Ronquitto, Almacigo, Lena, Muchacho, Largo, Punta Infierno, Yana, Playa Blanca, Carabela, Pitajaya, Las Bolas,	9.30	0
Cayos Pingues	Cottoro, Macho, Rancho Alegre, Vivero, Anton, Chocolate,	20.46	0
Other islands	Alcatracito, Paloma, Cuervo, Algodoncito, Manuel Gomez, Santa Maria, Zaza de Afuera, Piedra Chica, Cachiboca, Indio, Carabinerro, Laberinto, Boca Seca, Campo Santo	20.00	0
Jardines de la Reina	Cayo Blanco, Tio Joaquin	175.00	0

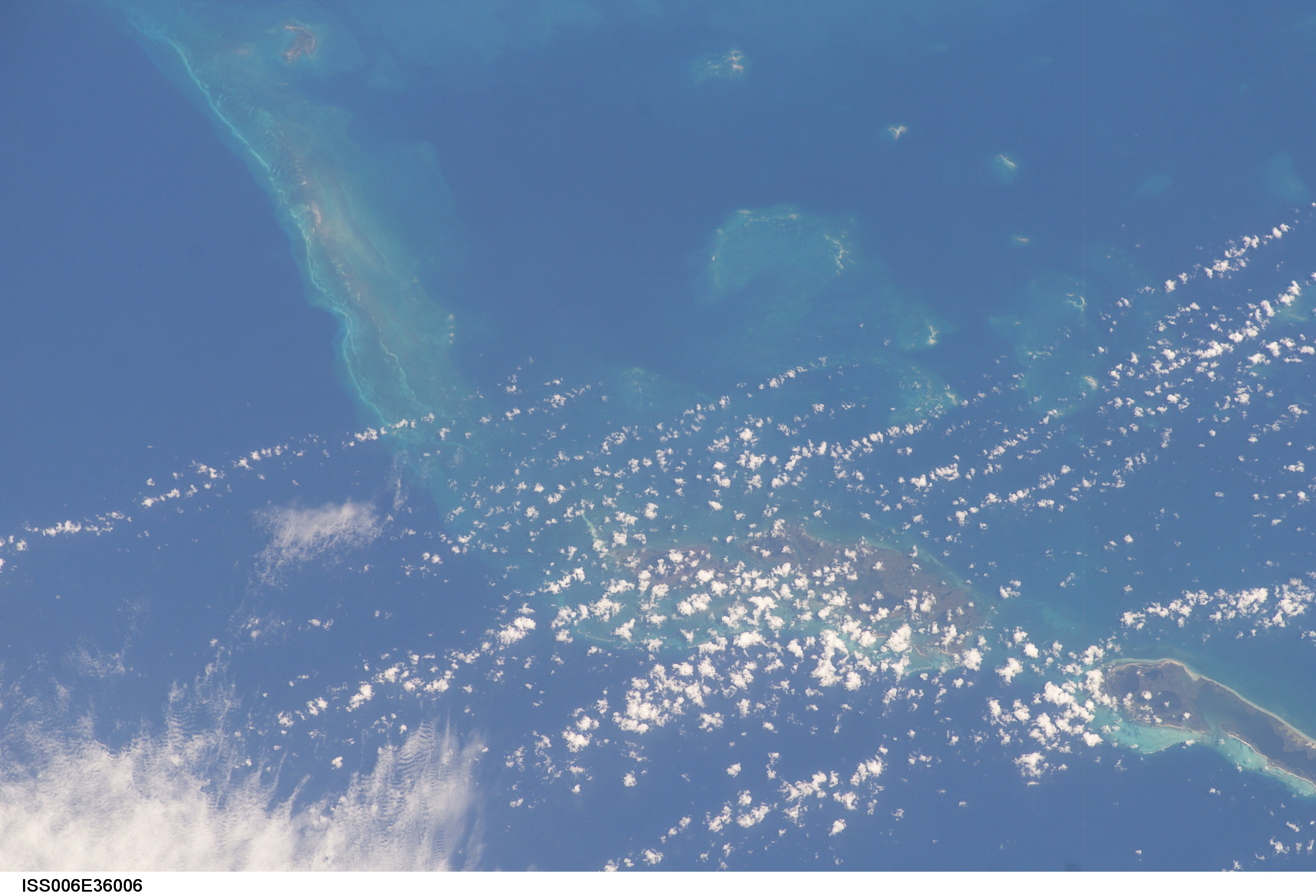
The west end of Jardines de la Reina: cayo Bretón, cayo Caballones and cayo Grande

== Fishing and diving ==
The archipelago is a popular destination for diving and sport fly-fishing. Only catch and release fly-fishing and a limited, well-regulated lobster fishery is allowed in the park, although many other fisheries surround the park. It used to be one of Fidel Castro's favorite fishing spots. Species of fish found here include cubera snapper, bonefish, yellowfin grouper, black grouper, Atlantic goliath grouper as well as Strombus gigas (the large Caribbean conch) and whale shark. Jardines de la Reina also hosts numerous silky and Caribbean reef sharks and crocodiles.

== See also ==
- Geography of Cuba
- Jardines del Rey
