= Cayo Fragoso =

Island off the north coast of Cuba

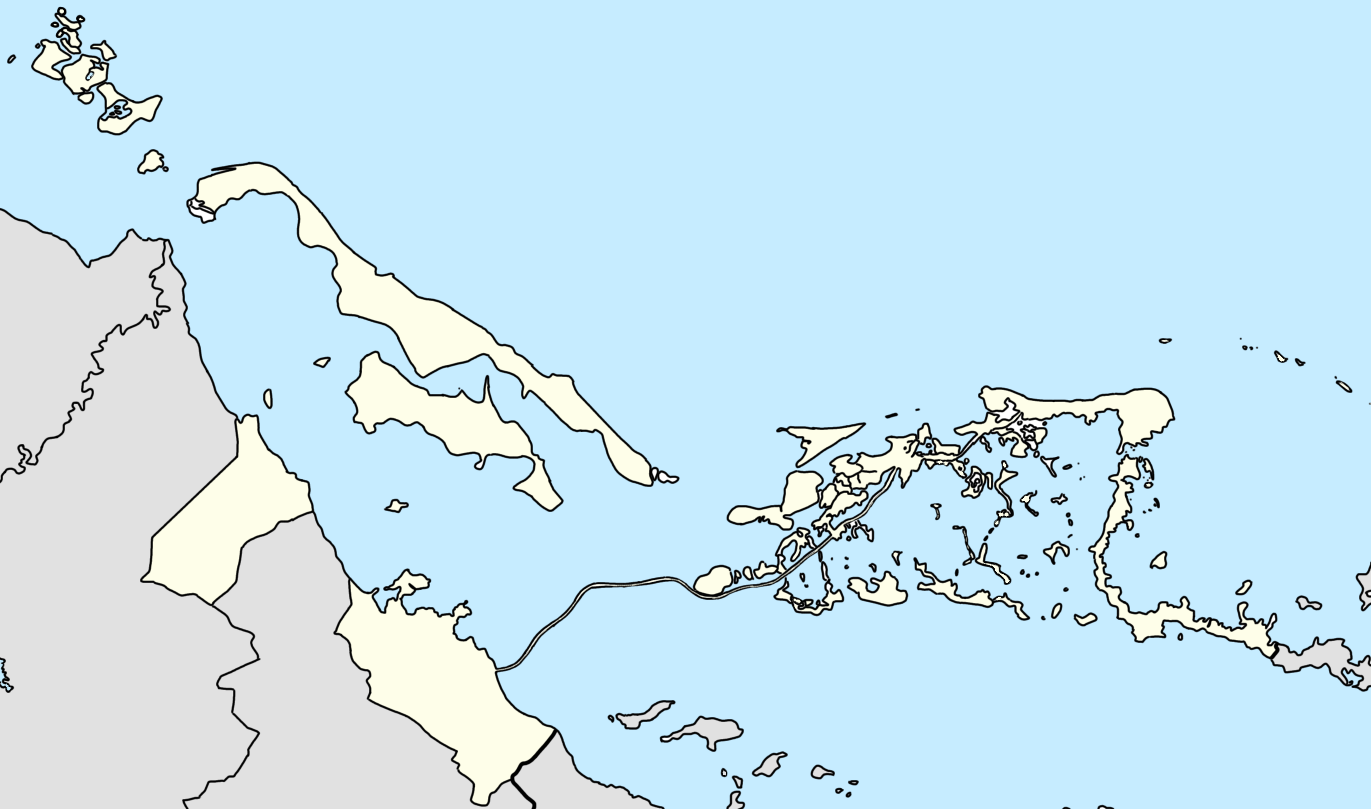
- Location within Cuba Location within Caibarién

Geography
- Location: Atlantic Ocean
- Coordinates: 22°44′N 79°32′W
- Archipelago: Sabana-Camagüey Archipelago
- Area: 101 km^{2} (39 sq mi)

Administration
- Cuba

Cayo Fragoso is an island off the north coast of Cuba. It has a total area of 101 square kilometers and is part of the Sabana-Camagüey Archipelago. Administratively, it belongs to the municipality of Caibarién, Villa Clara Province.

== See also ==
- Cayo Santa María
- Cayo Fragoso Lighthouse
