= Caibarién =

- Municipality
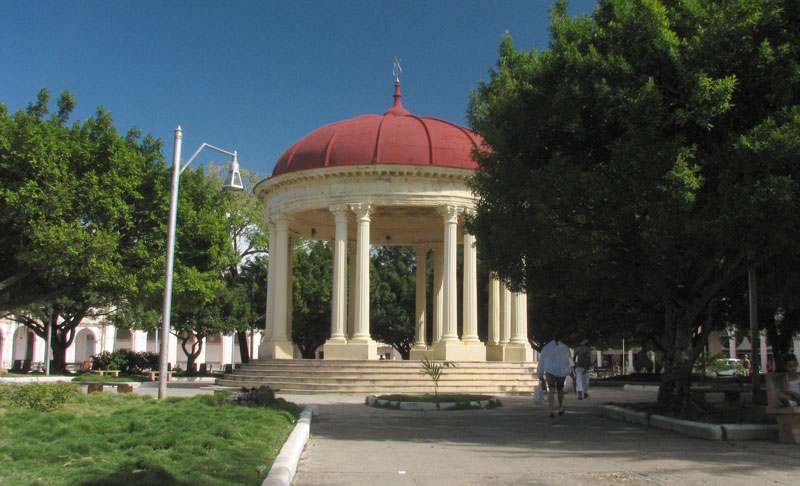
- The Glorieta of Caibarién

- Coat of arms
- Nickname: La Villa Blanca (The White Town)
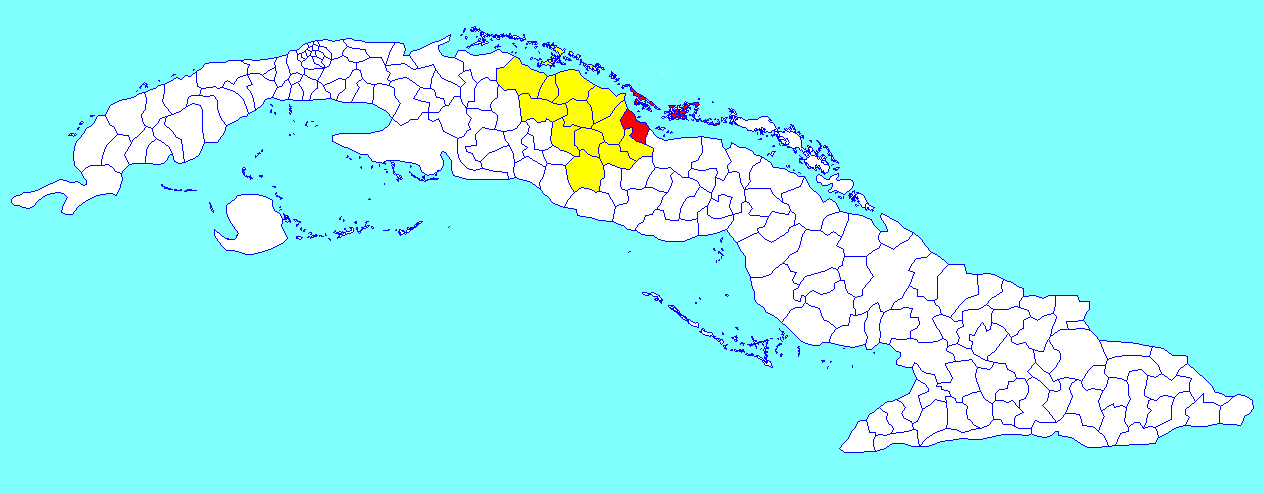
- Caibarién municipality (red) within Villa Clara Province (yellow) and Cuba
- Coordinates: 22°30′57″N 79°28′20″W
- Country: Cuba
- Province: Villa Clara
- Founded: 1832
- Established: 1873 (Village)
- Municipality: 1879

Area
  - Total: 212 km^{2} (82 sq mi)
- Elevation: 5 m (16 ft)

Population (2022)
  - Total: 40,798
  - Density: 192/km^{2} (498/sq mi)
- Time zone: UTC-5 (EST)
- Area code: +53-42

Caibarién is a municipality city in the Villa Clara province of Cuba.

Caibarién is known as "La Villa Blanca" (lit. 'The White Town') for its sands and beaches. They are famous for their "Parrandas" (Carnivals) along with Remedios (the neighboring town located 7 kilometres (4.3 mi) west) and Camajuaní.

== History ==
At the end of 1513, Pánfilo de Narváez las Casas and Grijalba explored the territory. Indigenous settlements were found in the region now occupied by the municipality and in Cayo Conuco.

In 1819, the port of Tesisco was closed and Caibarién was ordered to be opened. From 1822 onwards, neighbors from Remedios began to arrive and there was already a population center in the part of Parrado. Narciso de Justa gave land from his hacienda for the foundation of the town.

On October 26, 1832, the town was founded based on a plan conceived by Estratón Bauza. It had 42 blocks of 10 lots each and 375 of them were sold. The rest were destined to government dependencies.

On August 31, 1873, it was granted the title of Villa and on January 1, 1879, the town council was constituted, with Don Hipólito Escobar Martelo as its first mayor.

Before the war of 1895 the town had obtained a sustained progress, exhibiting such an economic power that it constituted a true astonishment at the time.

The first quarter of the 20th century was the one of greatest urban development. Along with the population increase, public and private buildings of great cultural, educational and industrial importance appeared.

The construction of the central highway, the port of Cienfuegos and the construction of the Tarafa railroad, together with the critical political situation, meant that the period up to 1959 was not a flourishing one for the overall economy of the municipality. From 1959, with the revolutionary triumph, a new era began. Until 1965, the Ciudad Pesquera, the Marcelo Salado neighborhood, multi-family buildings on the beach were built and industry, commerce and the standard of living of the entire population developed.

In the first two decades of the 21st century, the municipality experienced a marked decline, unprecedented since its foundation, due to the economic difficulties that affected the country in general. Among the most outstanding aspects of this period of decline were the destruction of the historical heritage, the deterioration of infrastructure and the loss of population, especially the young majority, due to emigration to other countries, mainly the United States. Unfortunately, this process of deterioration still continues and there is no near horizon that indicates that this trend will be reversed in the next few decades. As in the country as a whole, there has been a notable deterioration of public services and health and human development indicators in the municipality. However, it is important to mention that there are no official statistics in this regard, or at least they are not published in an accessible manner.

== Geography ==
The city is situated on the north coast of Cuba, bordering the Bay of Buena Vista (Bahía de Buena Vista) of the Atlantic Ocean. It lies at the eastern extremity of the Villa Clara Province, close to the border with Sancti Spíritus Province. The town is served by the Caibarién Airport (IATA: -, ICAO: MUCB).

The municipality is divided into the barrios of Primero, Segundo, Tercero, Cuarto and Quinto.

=== Cayo Conuco ===
Cayo Conuco is a tiny island located 7 kilometres (4 miles) from Caibarién, which is joined to the mainland by a stone causeway. It was recently covered only by thin, dry pasture, however native plant species have resumed their original place. In 1948, the Asociación de Scouts de Cuba held its second national Jamboree in Cayo Conuco.

== Economy and tourism ==
Caibarién once served as a shipping point for agricultural commodities, such as sugarcane, tobacco, and fruit. It also served as a sponge-fishing center. Its hotels are now destroyed by lack of care, and most concrete houses are crumbling onto its streets. The piers that once served as shipping points for agricultural commodities have fallen into the bay. The two sugar mills that used to send their sugar exports through the harbor are now closed and crumbling. The major sugar mill (Reforma) is now a museum for tourists.

The Parrandas carnivals take place twice a year in August–September and mid-December. They last usually for about two weeks at a time.

The main center for tourists in Caibarién is "Los Cayos" (The keys) with such cays as Cayo Santa María, Cayo Fragoso, Cayo Las Brujas, etc. New Cuban reforms now allow Cuban citizens to enter the resorts and beaches that were once exclusive to tourists.

== Demographics ==
In 2022, the municipality of Caibarién had a population of 40,798. With a total area of 212 km^{2} (82 sq mi), it has a population density of 179.5/km^{2} (465/sq mi).

== Twin towns/Sister cities ==
- Bloomington, United States

== Gallery ==
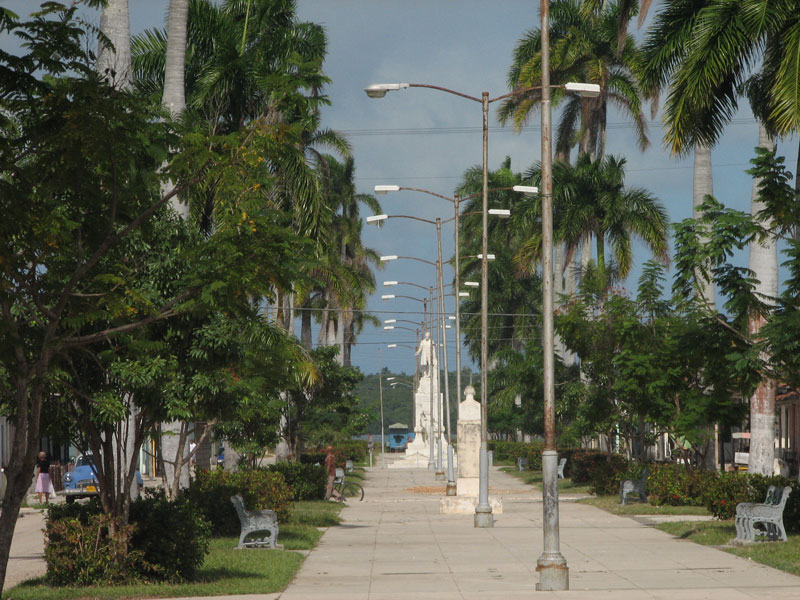
Caibarién's pedestrian 'El Paseo Martí' walk. Similar streets are popular in Cuban cities like Havana, Camajuaní and Placetas for instance.

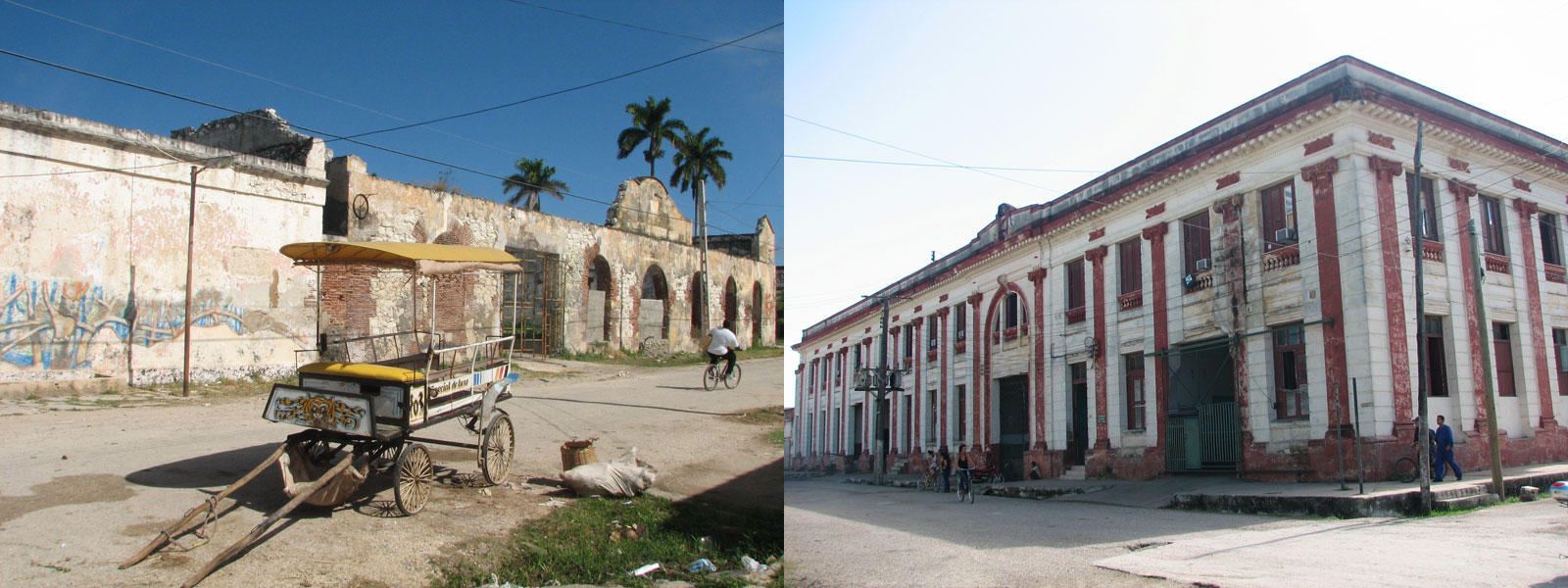
Less than a century ago one of the biggest and busiest port cities in Cuba, but today the still standing colonial storehouses are empty and collapsing owing to lack of restoration and use.

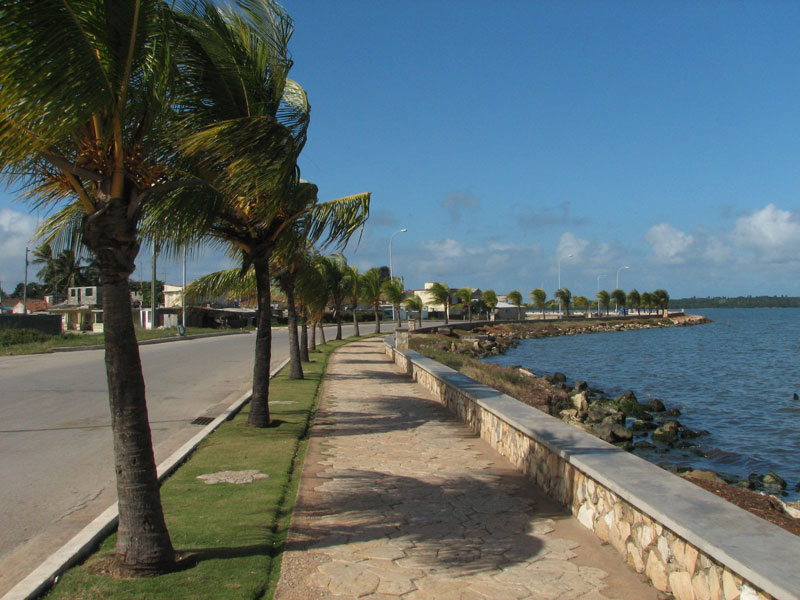
The newly made sea walk. Tourism in the northern cays of Caibarién's waters have infused a little money for public works in the city, still; most of the historic buildings are left aside until they collapse.

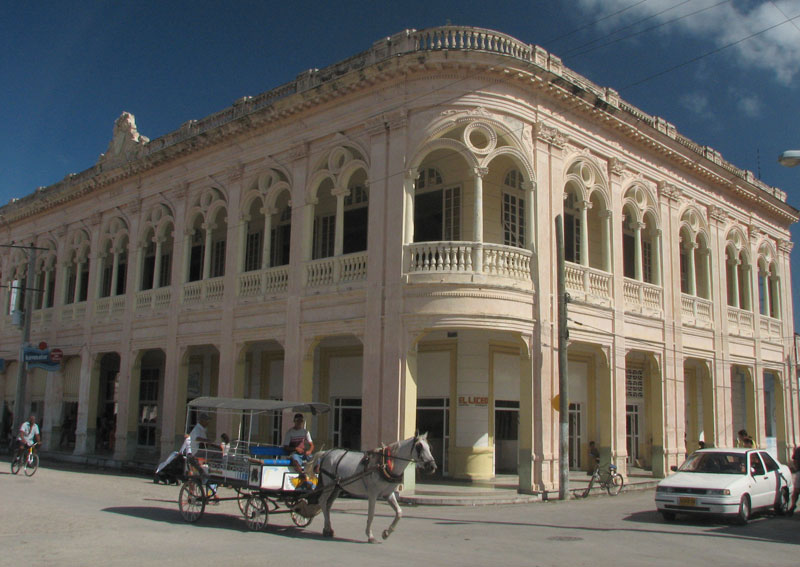
Former lyceum today holds shops and Caibarién's local history museum.

== See also ==
- Cayo Fragoso Lighthouse
- Cayo Santa María Lighthouse
- Municipalities of Cuba
- List of cities in Cuba
