= Cayo Cruz del Padre =

Island on the northern coast of Cuba

- Location within Cuba

Geography
- Location: Sabana-Camagüey Archipelago
- Coordinates: 23°15′54″N 80°54′40″W

Administration
- Cuba

Cayo Cruz del Padre is an uninhabited island on the northern coast of Cuba, in the province of Matanzas. It belongs to the Sabana section of the Sabana-Camagüey Archipelago.
