= Cape San Antonio, Cuba =

Cape at western extremity of Cuba

Cabo San Antonio
- Cape
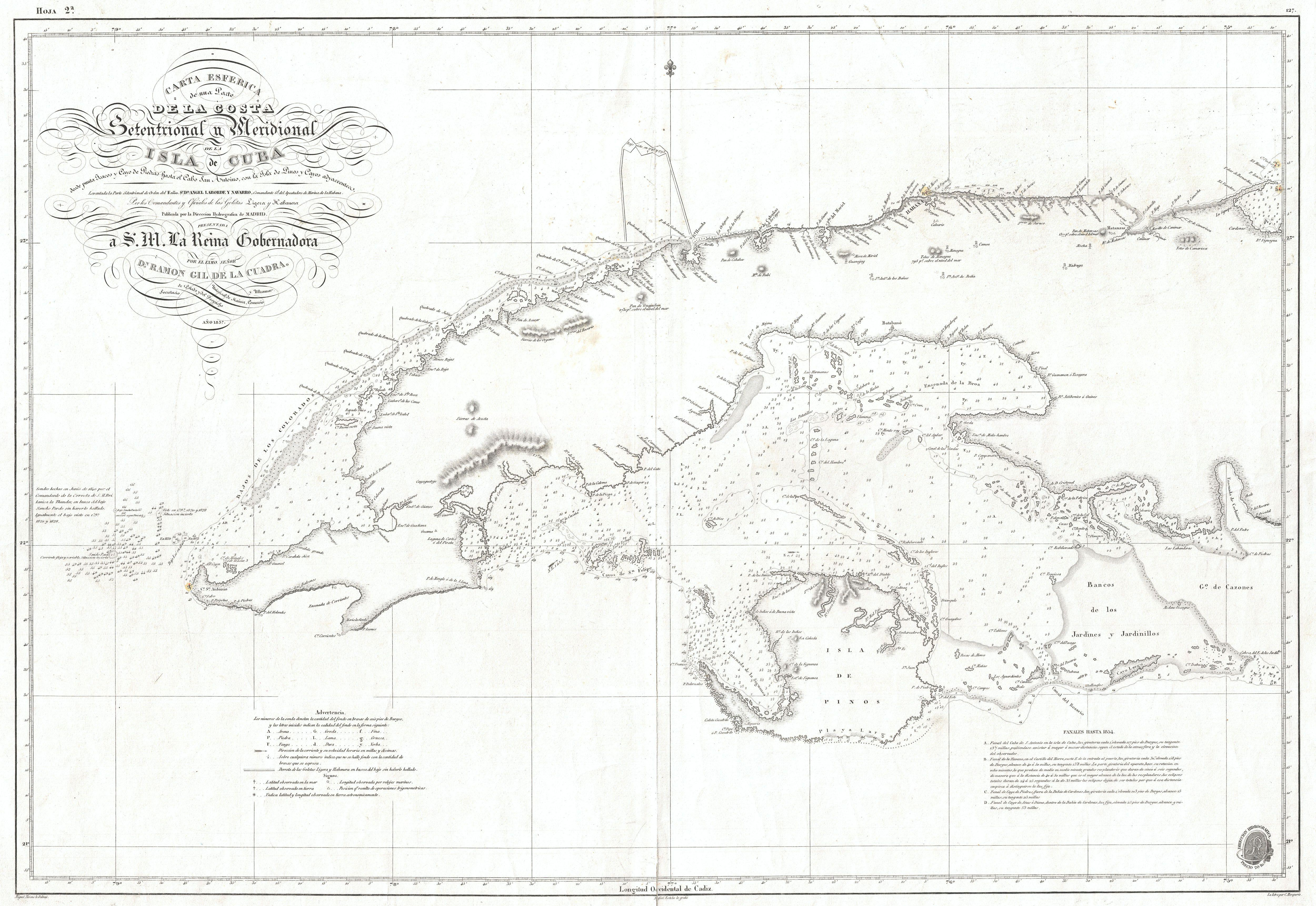
- 1837 map of western Cuba showing Cabo San Antonio

- Location within Cuba
- Coordinates: 21°51′50.57″N 84°55′13.53″W
- Water bodies: Caribbean Sea

Cape San Antonio (Spanish: Cabo San Antonio), is a cape which forms the western extremity of the Guanahacabibes Peninsula and the western extremity of Cuba. It extends into the Yucatán Channel, and is part of the municipality of Sandino, in Pinar del Río Province.

According to the International Hydrographic Organization, the line between the lighthouse at Cabo Catoche on the north tip of the Yucatán Peninsula in Mexico and the lighthouse at Cape San Antonio marks the division between the Caribbean Sea to the south and Gulf of Mexico to the north.

== See also ==
- Cape Maisí
- Cape Corrientes
- Cabo San Antonio Lighthouse
