= Maisí =

- Municipality
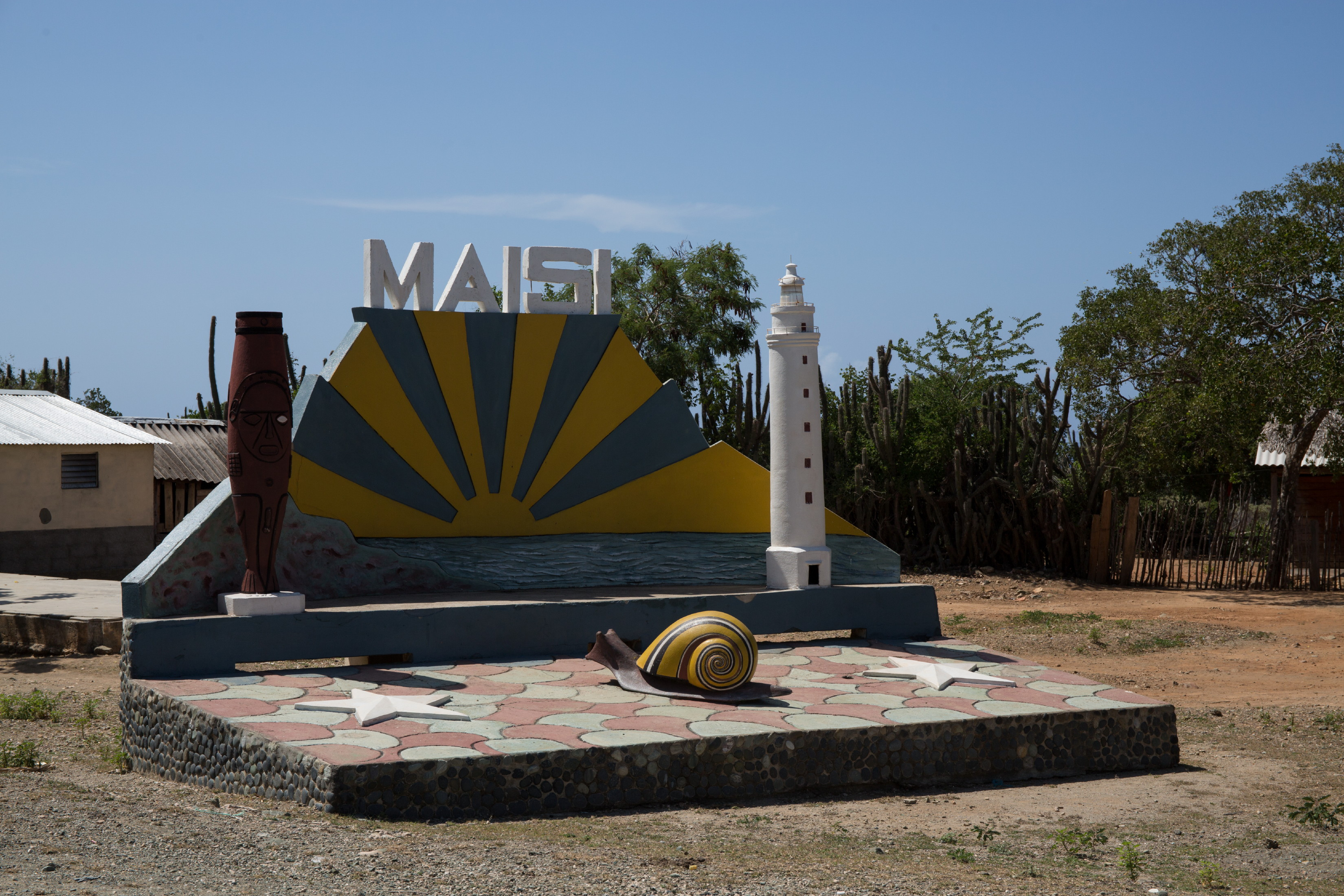

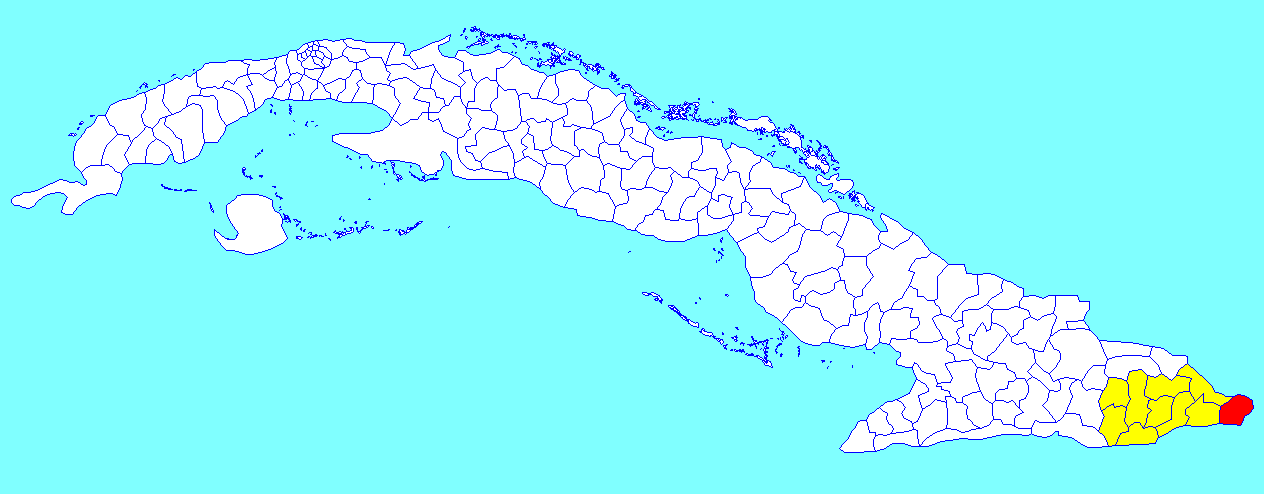
- Maisí municipality (red) within Guantánamo Province (yellow) and Cuba
- Coordinates: 20°14′35″N 74°9′22″W
- Country: Cuba
- Province: Guantánamo
- Seat: La Máquina

Area
  - Total: 525 km^{2} (203 sq mi)
- Elevation: 25 m (82 ft)

Population (2022)
  - Total: 28,976
  - Density: 55.2/km^{2} (143/sq mi)
- Time zone: UTC-5 (EST)
- Area code: +53-21
- Website: https://www.maisi.gob.cu/es/

Maisí is a municipality and town in the Guantánamo Province of Cuba. Its administrative seat is located in the town of La Máquina.

== Geography ==
The easternmost point of Cuba, Punta Maisí (called "Baitiquiri" by the Taíno in pre-colonial times) is located in this municipality.

== Demographics ==
In 2022, the municipality of Maisí had a population of 28,276. With a total area of 525 km^{2} (203 sq mi), it has a population density of 55/km^{2} (140/sq mi).

== See also ==
- Punta Maisí Lighthouse
- List of cities in Cuba
- Municipalities of Cuba
