= Sandino (disambiguation) =

Augusto César Sandino (1895–1934) was a Nicaraguan revolutionary.

Sandino may also refer to:

== People ==
- Catalina Sandino Moreno (born 1981), Colombian actress
- Felipe Díaz Sandino (1891–1960), Spanish aviator and Air Force Officer
- Victoria Sandino (born 1975), Colombian politician and ex-insurgent
- Sandino Martin (born 1991), Filipino actor

== Places ==
- Ciudad Sandino, a municipality in the Managua department of Nicaragua
- Puerto Sandino, a town in the León Department of Nicaragua
- Sandino, Cuba, a municipality in the Pinar del Río Province of Cuba
- Sandino Municipal Museum, a museum located in Sandino, Cuba
- Villa Sandino, a municipality in the Chontales Department of Nicaragua

== Other uses ==
- Sandino (film), a 1990 Spanish-Nicaraguan biographical film about him

== See also ==
- Augusto C. Sandino International Airport, a Nicaraguan airport named after him
- Estadio Augusto César Sandino, a Cuban multi-use stadium named after him
