= ELAM 10 Rafael Ferro Macias =

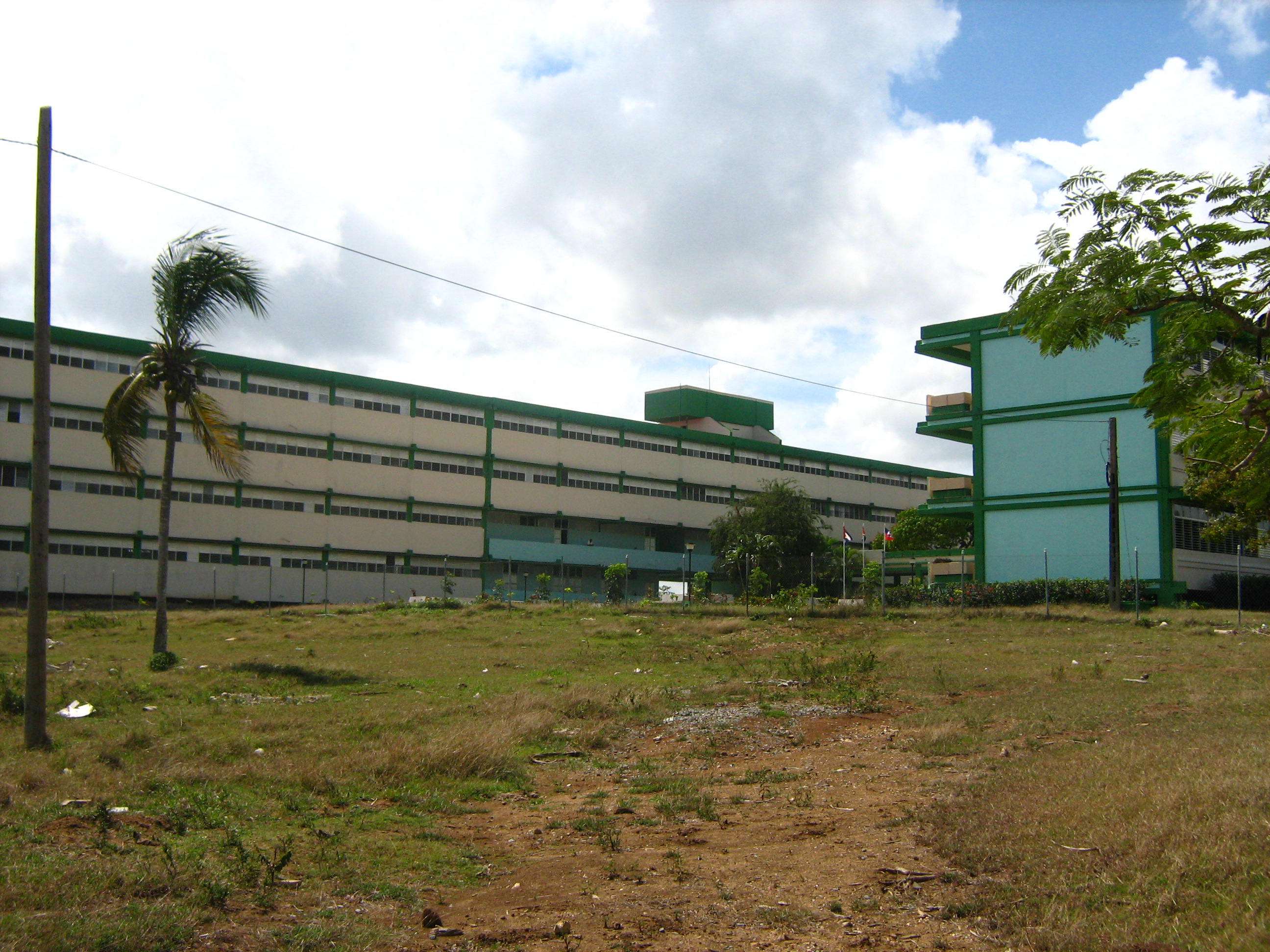
ELAM 10: Rafael Ferro Macias

ELAM 10 Rafael Ferro Macias is a faculty of the Escuela Latinamericana de Medicina (ELAM), (known as the Latin American School of Medicine) located in Sandino, in the province of Pinar del Río, Cuba. The school in total has more than 19,000 students. ELAM was founded in 1999, and is the largest medical university in the world. The faculty at ELAM 10 comprises approximately 300 students from 18 countries including Antigua, Bahamas, Barbados, Belize, Dominica, Dominican Republic, Ecuador, Grenada, Guadeloupe, Guyana, Haiti, Jamaica, Nauru, The Solomon Islands, St. Lucia, St. Vincent, Suriname and Trinidad and Tobago. All of these countries are in or close to the Caribbean except The Solomon Islands, Nauru and Vanuatu, which are all located in the Pacific. Also the students of this school are mostly from anglophone countries with the exception of Belize (which shares borders with Mexico and Guatemala) and Ecuador where Spanish is spoken natively, and Haiti where French and French Creole are the dominant languages.

In 2008, the school was under the jurisdiction of two leaders: Irma Martinez Silva, the director of the premedical programme and Nadia Macias Hernandez, the dean of the medical programme.

== Grouping system ==
The school currently comprises nine different groups and four advances. Each advance is defined by the level of Spanish known upon entry of the school.

The first advance is composed of group seven and contains 34 students from Belize, Ecuador, Guyana, Haiti, Jamaica, St. Lucia and Suriname. This group is considered to speak the most fluent Spanish in the school although a few grammatical errors still exist among those who had very little exposure to Spanish in their respective countries. Also this group is known to have exposure to variants of Spanish spoken by Cubans, Nicaraguans, Bolivians, Ecuadorians, Argentinians and other countries. This group has recently matriculated into the school of medicine.

The second advance is composed of groups one to six and contains students from Antigua, Bahamas, Barbados, Belize, Dominica, Guyana, Haiti, Jamaica, Nauru, St. Lucia, St. Vincent, and Suriname. This group is considered to speak a fair amount of Spanish that allows them to communicate with most persons within the community and to communicate fluently enough with their respective teachers. These students are a part of the premedical school.

The third advance is composed of group eight and contains students from Haiti and The Solomon Islands. The students of this group arrived in the month of March 2008 with little or almost no knowledge of Spanish. This group speaks Spanish sufficiently enough to communicate and have conversation with other Spanish speakers but they do not possess a large dominion over the language. These students are a part of the premedical school

The fourth advance is the newest advance of the school and contains students from The Bahamas, Guadeloupe, Haiti, Trinidad and Tobago and Vanuatu. These students arrived in late August and September 2008 and will begin classes shortly in the premedical school.

== Languages ==
Because of the variety of countries present in this school, there are many languages spoken. Among those are: English, Dutch, French, Spanish, Javanese, Hindi, Nauruan and various creoles such as Bajan, Jamaican Creole, Belizean Creole, French Creole, Guyanese Creole, Trinidadian Creole, Pidgin and Sranan Tongo (A creole language spoken in Suriname). There is also a small presence of Maroon languages spoken in Suriname such as Ndyuka.

== Culture and lifestyle ==
The students of ELAM10 have somewhat developed a culture of their own, which includes a rich mixture of cultures worldwide with a Caribbean base.

== Living conditions ==
The boarding house of the school, which is annexed to the actual school by a bridge of sorts, consists of 28 available dormitories, each containing 8 bunk beds and thus housing 16 persons in each room. The school, therefore has enough capacity high enough for 448 students. This value excludes 4 rooms which are currently used by the ancillary staff of the school and also a separate section reserved for teachers.

These rooms are divided into sections. The males dormitory has sections V1 to V4 and the females dormitory has sections from H2 to H4. Each section contains 4 rooms and a large communal bathroom which has seven toilets, six shower stalls, a large wash sink with six taps and a smaller wash sink with three taps.

There are also several recreational areas on the campus. These include a shaded park in the front of the school with large poinciana trees used as an area for study and also for worship by various students. There are several sporting areas as well. These include 2 basketball courts, a volleyball court, and a sand area used to practice various sports such as beach football, beach volleyball and also for traditional games played by the students. There is also a driveway of approximately 120 metres used for athletic activity.

There are also several useful facilities on the campus such as a washroom, a general dining room and a nurse bay. Also, there are intranet facilities with highly restricted internet in each classroom where students have the opportunity to communicate with family and people from other schools using email addresses given to them by the school.

== See also ==
- Sandino, Cuba
- ELAM 5 Combate Ceja del Negro
- Latin American School of Medicine (Cuba)
