= ELAM 5 Combate Ceja del Negro =

Cuban polyclinic

ELAM 5 Combate Ceja del Negro is a Cuban polyclinic and Medical Science facility located in the municipality of Sandino, Pinar del Río Province.

The school is one of several faculties of its kind falling under the jurisdiction of the Cuban-Venezuelan initiative, as well as a new program to train more Latin-American doctors.

ELAM 5 presently has approximately 390 students from Guyana, most of whom were received between November 22 and 23 in 2006. In September of 2008, another group of approximately 100 Guyanese students who did their premed studies at ELAM 10 Rafael Ferro Macias arrived.

The facility is known for having one of the highest grade point averages in Sandino.

== Campus ==
This campus is located on the outskirts of the town of Sandino, surrounded by an orange orchard.

The school consists of three buildings, the first of which contains classrooms and administrative sectors. The largest building contains dormitories, a laundromat, a theater, a laboratory, and a polyclinic. The smallest building houses the mess hall and food storage facilities.

The campus is designed to accommodate around 450 students. Recreational features of the campus include a plaza, volleyball courts. basketball courts, and a soccer field.

== Curriculum ==
The ELAM project is aimed at creating medical professionals. This new program differs from the conventional teaching of medical sciences as separated subjects, but instead aims to apply an integrated approach to medicine, offering subjects like Human Morphology and Physiology. All subjects are taught in Spanish and have weekly content orientations and evaluations, followed by an end of course examination. Students who do not meet the required grade after the final examinations are required to take another examination two weeks later. The medical program lasts 6 years with a final year internship, with the new school year beginning every September and ending around July or August.

== Culture ==
The curriculum at ELAM 5 aims to promote Cuban culture by incorporating local customs and culture into the students' daily routines. This includes the use of particular local phrases, and a dancing casino (dance endemic to Cuba).

== See also ==
- ELAM 10 Rafael Ferro Macias
- Sandino, Cuba
- Latin American School of Medicine (Cuba)
