= La Fe (Sandino) =

- Village
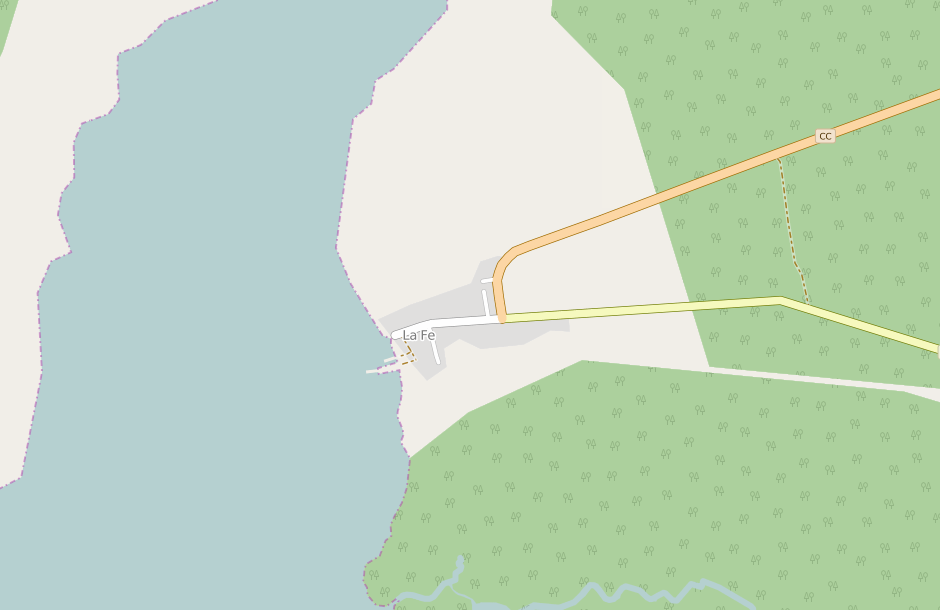
- OSM map showing La Fe and the surrounding area. The map shows also, in orange, the "Carretera Central" highway

- Location of La Fe in Cuba
- Coordinates: 22°02′25.44″N 84°16′17.33″W
- Country: Cuba
- Province: Pinar del Río
- Municipality: Sandino
- Elevation: 4 m (13 ft)
- Time zone: UTC-5 (EST)
- Area code: +53-82

La Fe (Spanish for "The Faith") is a Cuban village of the municipality of Sandino, in Pinar del Río Province. It is part of the consejo popular of Cayuco.

== Geography ==
Located in a recess of the Guadiana Bay (Bahía de Guadiana), close to the Guanahacabibes Peninsula and its national park, it is one of the westernmost places in Cuba, 100 km (62 mi) from Cape San Antonio, the island's western extremity. It is 10 km (6.2 mi) from the nearby village of Cayuco, 9 km (5.6 mi) from Sandino and 84 km (52 mi) from Pinar del Río.

== Transport ==
The village counts a little port and a road linking it to the villages in Guanahacabibes peninsula. It is mainly famous to be the western starting point of the Carretera Central, a highway spanning the length of the island of Cuba for 1,435 km (892 mi), that ends in the city of Baracoa, Guantánamo Province.
