= Sacred Heart of Jesus Catholic Church (Sandino, Cuba) =

Catholic parish church in Sandino, Cuba

Sacred Heart of Jesus Catholic Church is a Catholic parish church in Sandino, Cuba. It is the first Catholic church to be completed in Cuba since the end of the Cuban Revolution in 1959.

Sacred Heart of Jesus Catholic Church is one of three Catholic churches authorized by Cuba to be built as gesture to strengthen relations with the Vatican. It was the first church out of three authorized to be completed, with construction ending in 2018. The inaugural ceremony took place in January 2019. The church was financed by the congregation St. Lawrence Catholic Church in Tampa, Florida.
