= Guanahacabibes Peninsula =

Peninsula in Cuba

Guanahacabibes
- IUCN category II (national park)
- Location within Cuba
- Location: Cuba
- Nearest city: Sandino
- Coordinates: 21°52′44″N 84°49′23″W
- Area: 398.26 km^{2} (153.77 sq mi)
- Established: 1987 (Biosphere Reserve)

Guanahacabibes Peninsula is the westernmost point on the island of Cuba. It is located in Pinar del Río Province, in the municipality of Sandino, and is sparsely populated. The waters surrounding the peninsula are important spiny lobster and red snapper fishing grounds. It also boasts the category of Biosphere Reserve, listed by UNESCO in 1987. Its western extremity, Cape San Antonio (Spanish: Cabo San Antonio), is the westernmost point of Cuba. It lies closer to the Pacific than to the easternmost point of the country, Cape Maisí.

== Overview ==
Its location in the open waters of the Gulf of Mexico makes it vulnerable to hurricanes. The area was severely affected by Hurricane Ivan in 2004 and Hurricane Wilma in 2005.

== Conservation ==
The Guanahacabibes National Park on the peninsula is one of the country's largest natural reserves and is separated from the rest of the island by white-sand plains, where one of Cuba's largest lakeside areas lies. A relatively small area holds some 100 lakes and the largest and purest fields of silica sand, which is 99.8% pure. Nature tourism is a major attraction in the 398.26 km^{2} (153.77 sq mi) National Park. The area is inhabited by 172 species of birds belonging to 42 families, 11 of which are endemic and 84 are migratory. Experts also believe that four of the seven species of marine turtles living on the planet have survived in the Guanahacabibes Peninsula. The coastline also contains preserved coral reefs, with the northern coast being lined by the cays and isles of the western Colorados Archipelago. The area in the southwestern plain shows a considerable development of the karst structures that limits the existence of superficial waters but permits the ingression of the surrounding seawater. Bottlenose dolphins can be found in the waters as well.

The peninsula was one of the last refuges of aboriginals fleeing from the Spanish conquistadors and also holds some 140 archeological sites linked to the life of aborigines, who were known as Guanahatabeyes.

== See also ==
- Geography of Cuba
- La Fe (Sandino)
