= Sandino Municipal Museum =

Museum in Cuba

- Museo Municipal de Sandino
- Established: 14 December 1980
- Location: Sandino, Cuba
- Director: Rolando Lamas Machado

Sandino Municipal Museum is a museum located in Sandino, Cuba. It was established on 14 December 1980.

It has five rooms and holds several collections on archaeology, history, fauna and flora.

== See also ==
- List of museums in Cuba
