= Victoria Sandino =

Colombian politician and ex warrior FARC-EP

Judith Simanca Herrera
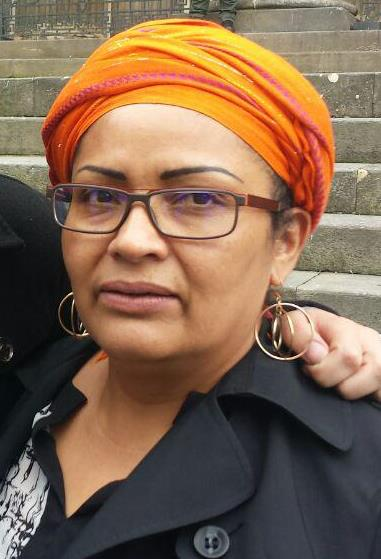
- Born: 1975 (age 50–51); Tierralta, Córdoba, Colombia
- Other name: Victoria Sandino Palmera
- Occupation: politician
- Political party: Common Alternative Revolutionary Force

Senator of Colombia
- Incumbent
- Assumed office 20 July 2018

Judith Simanca Herrera (born in 1975, Tierralta, Córdoba), better known by her pseudonym Victoria Sandino Palmera, is a Colombian politician and ex-insurgent. She was commander of the Revolutionary Armed Forces of Colombia until its dissolution in 2017. Since then, she is member of the Common Alternative Revolutionary Force and the committee for the implementation of the peace accord.
