= Sandino, Cuba =

Sandino
- Municipality
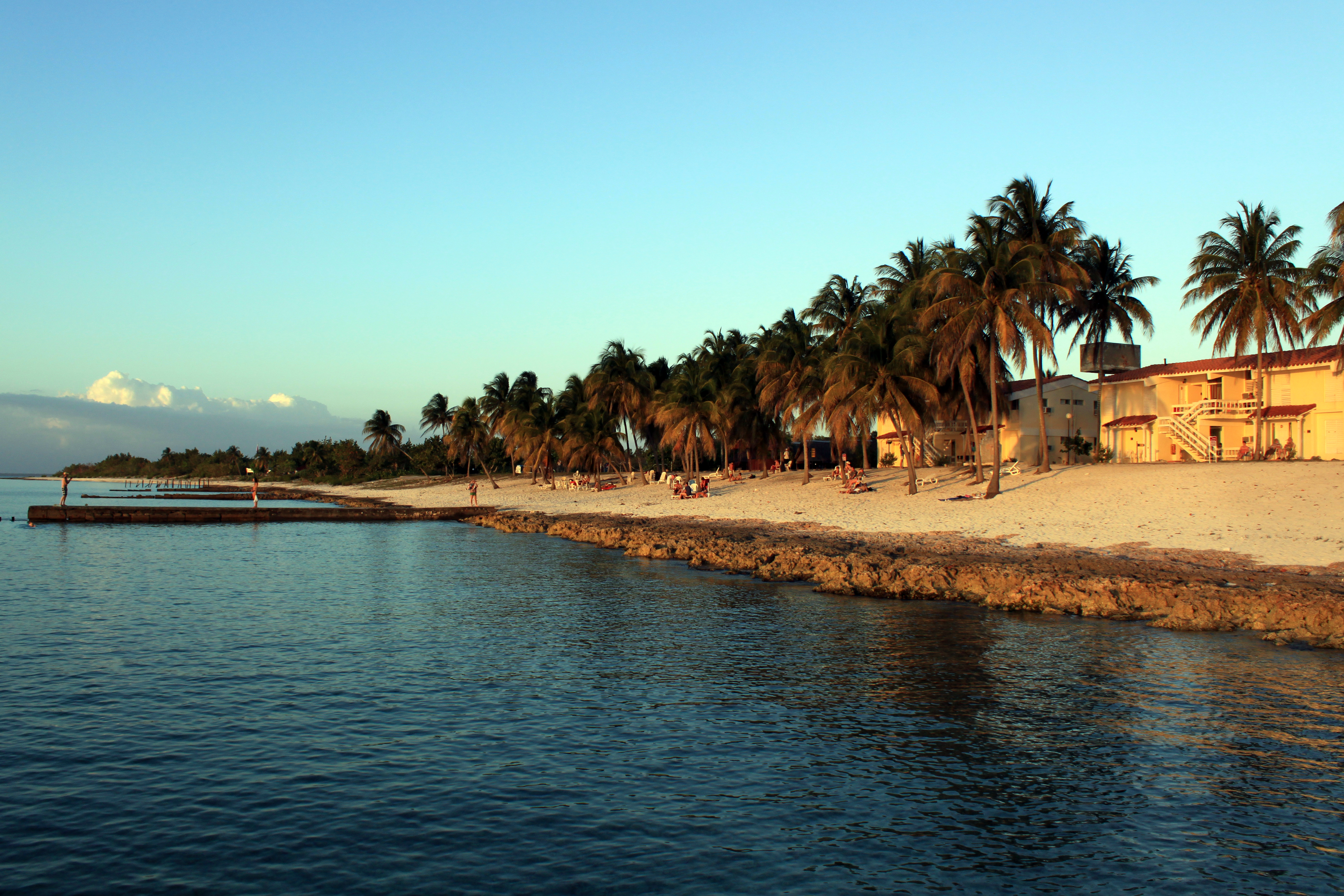
- Maria la Gorda

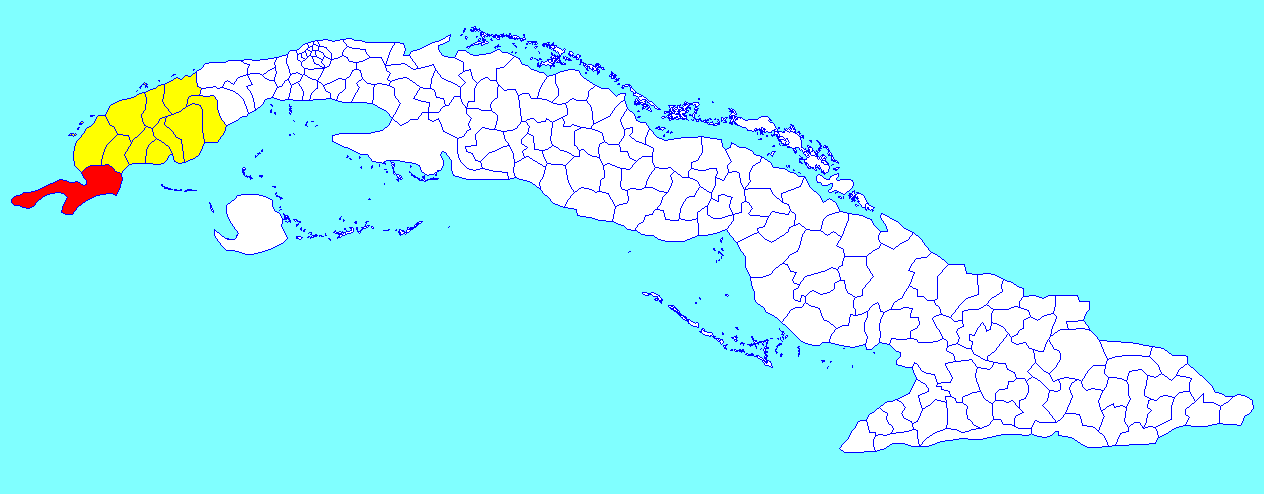
- Sandino municipality (red) within Pinar del Río Province (yellow) and Cuba
- Coordinates: 22°04′49.12″N 84°12′21.67″W
- Country: Cuba
- Province: Pinar del Río

Area
  - Municipality: 1,718 km^{2} (663 sq mi)
- Elevation: 10 m (33 ft)

Population (2022)
  - Municipality: 35,437
  - Density: 20.63/km^{2} (53.42/sq mi)
  - Urban: 22,314
  - Rural: 13,123
- Time zone: UTC-5 (EST)
- Area code: +53-82

Sandino is a municipality and town in the Pinar del Río Province of Cuba. The town is located close to the coast and as such, fishing is its the main economic resource. It is also the gateway to the Guanahacabibes Peninsula, a UNESCO Biosphere Reserve.

== History ==
The municipality was named after the Nicaraguan revolutionary, Augusto César Sandino. In January 2019 Sacred Heart of Jesus Catholic Church in Sandino became the first Catholic church in Cuba to be inaugurated since the Cuban Revolution.

== Geography ==
Located in the westernmost area of Cuba, the municipality borders with the territories of Guane and Mantua. Its westernmost point is Cape San Antonio (Cabo de San Antonio), on the Guanahacabibes Peninsula.

The municipality includes the hamlets of Babineyes, Bolívar, Cayuco, Cortés, Covadonga, La Bajada, La Conchita, La Fe, La Furnia, La Grifa, Las Martinas, La Yana, Las Tumbas, Los Cayuelos, María la Gorda, Marina Cabo San Antonio, Roncali, San Julián, Santa Barbara, Valle San Juan and Veinte de Mayo.

== Demographics ==
In 2022, the municipality of Sandino had a population of 35,437. With a total area of 1,718 km^{2} (663 sq mi), it has a population density of 21/km^{2} (54/sq mi).

== Education ==
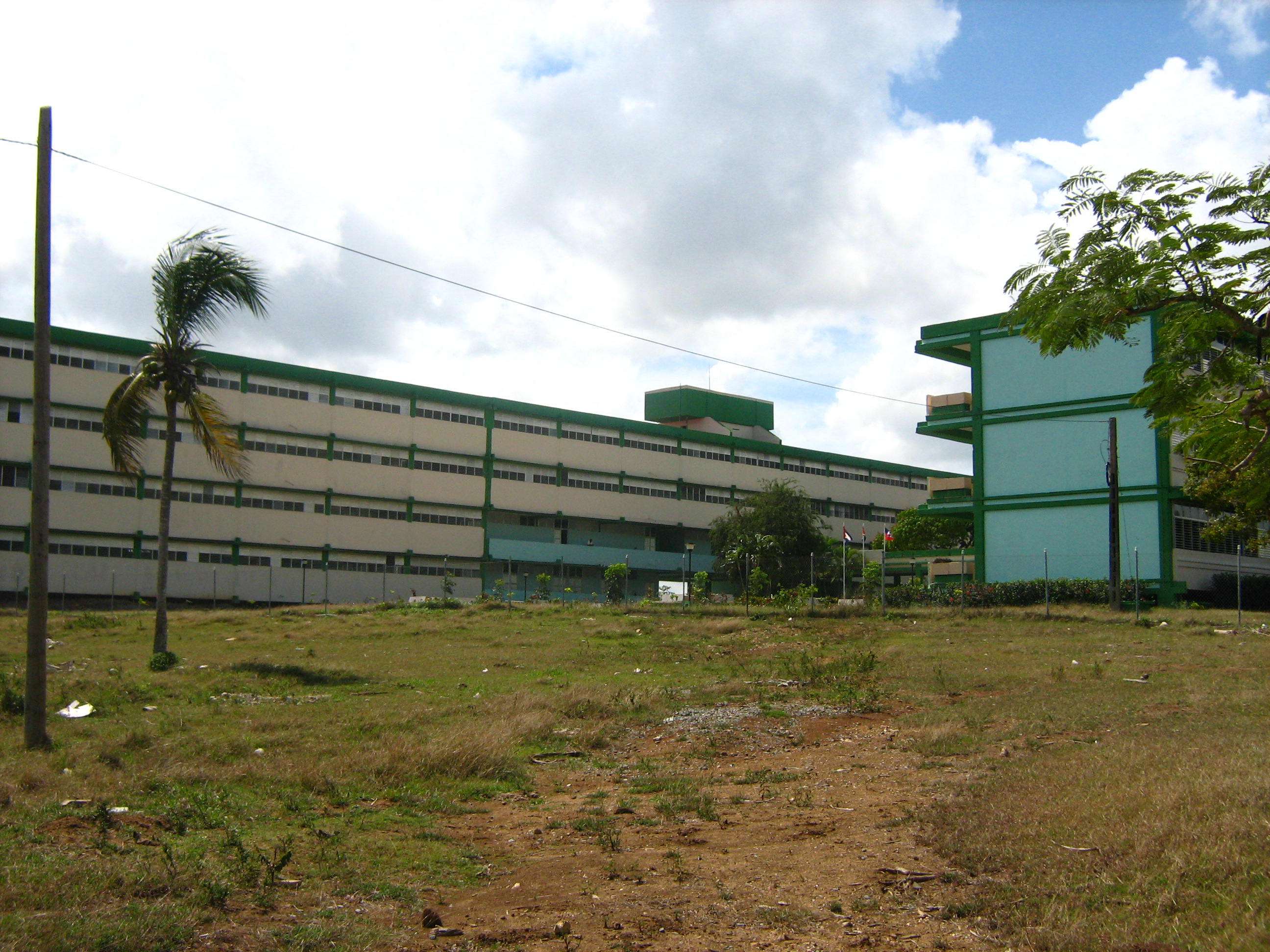
ELAM 10 building

Various high schools (Spanish secundarias) are established in Sandino, with students from San Juan y Martinez, San Luis, all the way to Guane and Isabel Rubio (approximately an area of about 70 kilometres (43 mi)). Sandino is the newest pole of the Cuban university program ELAM (Escuela Latinoamericana de Medicina) where the Cuban government has placed many similar medical faculties. Many of the students are from Latin America and Caribbean countries such as Guyana, Argentina, Ecuador, Nicaragua, El Salvador, Bolivia, Peru, Suriname, Dominica, St. Lucia, Belize, Jamaica, Haiti, St. Vincent, Antigua, Solomon Islands, Nauru, Grenada, Barbados and more countries to be expected like Tuvalu and the Philippines. They are part of the new education program of the Escuela Latin Americana de Medicina. There are several campuses located in this municipality. Most only contain people from one country (300 or more students), but there are others such as ELAM 10 that have more than 15 nationalities enrolled. These are however in lesser quantities and have a total of up to 500 students.

== Transportation ==
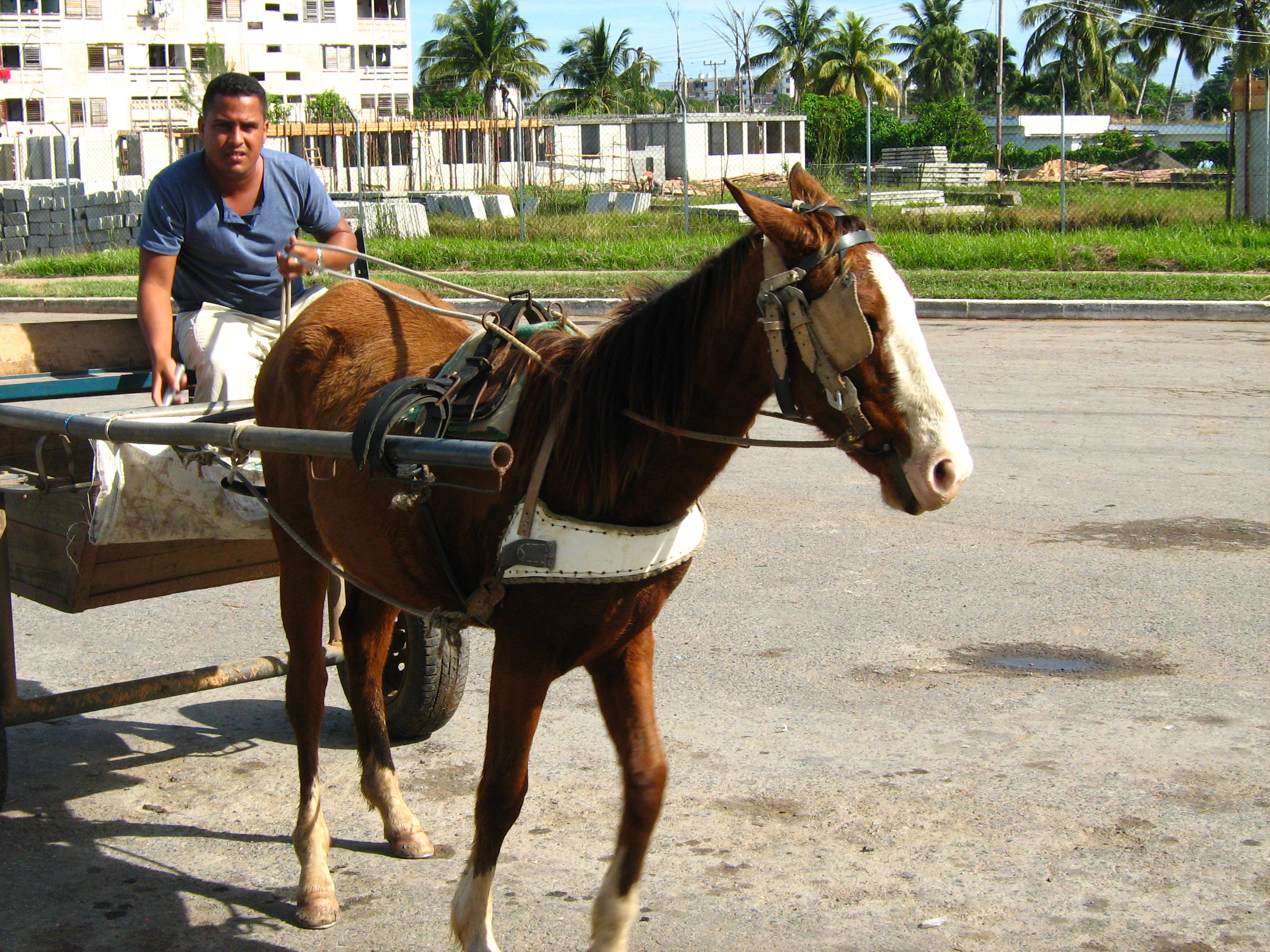
Mula in Sandino

There are few roads in this municipality, most of them unnamed. The locations are identified by the farms they lead towards. There are regular buses that serve the town of Sandino, with direct service to several locations as Guane, Isabel Rubio and Pinar del Río. It is not uncommon to see oxcarts, donkey-carts and horse-driven carts. Most people have to walk great distances before they can find viable transportation. Hitchhiking is very common in these areas.

In the village of La Fé starts the national road Carretera Central, passing also through Sandino.

== Notable people ==
- José Contreras (b. 1971), baseball player
- Daysbel Hernández (b. 1996), baseball player

== See also ==
- Municipalities of Cuba
- List of cities in Cuba
- Sandino Municipal Museum
- Cabo San Antonio Lighthouse
