= William Cooley (disambiguation) =

William Cooley (1783–1863), was an American settler in Florida.

William Cooley may also refer to:

- William Desborough Cooley (1795?–1883), Irish geographer
- William T. Cooley, United States Air Force major general
- William W. Cooley (born 1930), American educational researcher
