= Rickenbacker Causeway =

Bridge in Florida, United States of America

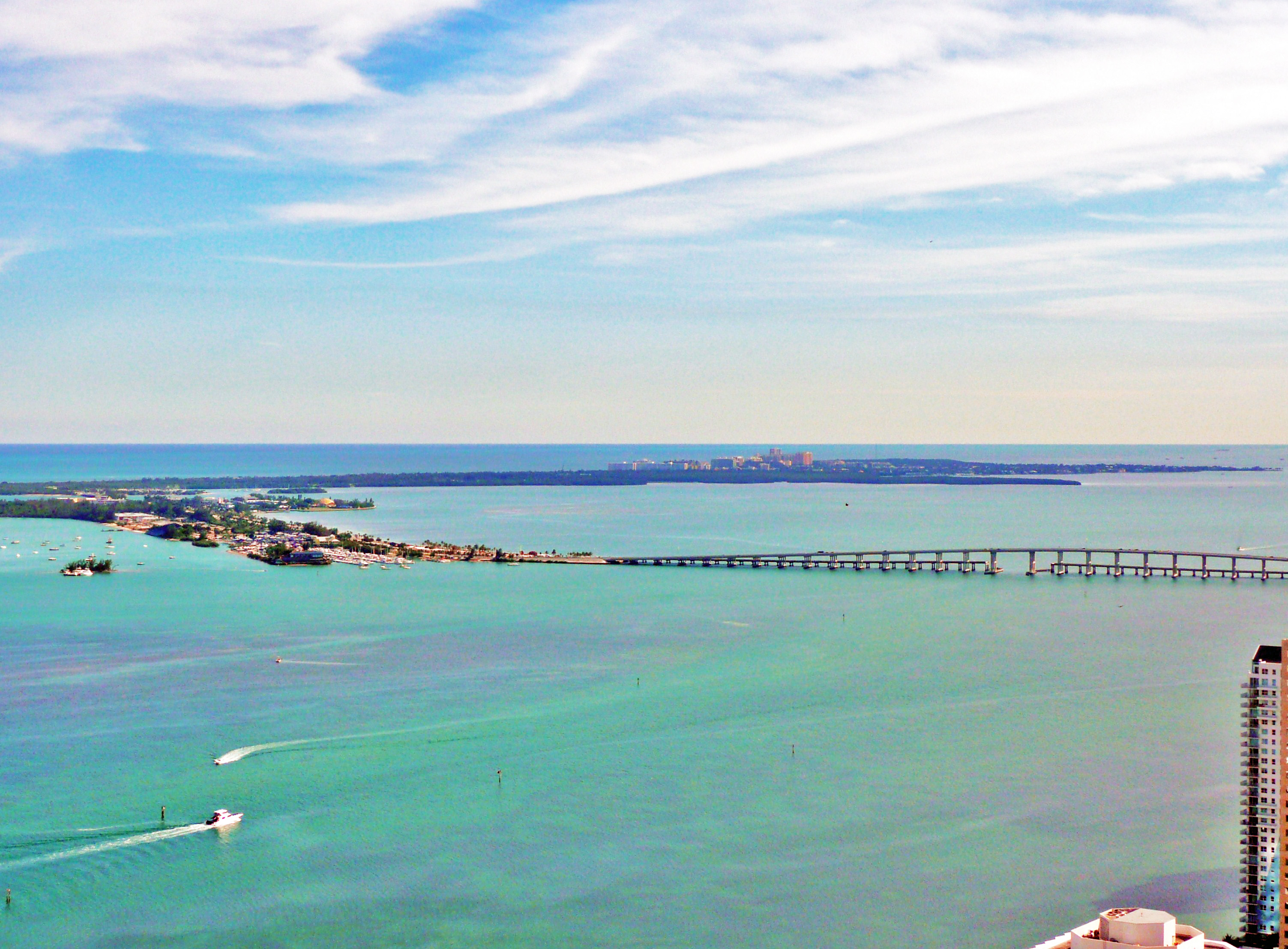
- Rickenbacker Causeway as seen from Downtown Miami in February 2010
- Coordinates: 25°44′01″N 80°09′45″W
- Carries: 6 lanes of unsigned SR 913
- Crosses: Biscayne Bay
- Locale: The Roads, Miami to Key Biscayne
- Maintained by: FDOT

Characteristics
- Total length: 5.4 miles (8.7 km)
- Longest span: 0.6 miles (0.97 km)

History
- Opened: November 9, 1947; 78 years ago

Statistics
- Toll: $2.25

Location
- Interactive map of Rickenbacker Causeway

The Rickenbacker Causeway is a causeway that connects Miami, Florida to the barrier islands of Virginia Key and Key Biscayne across Biscayne Bay.

== Background ==
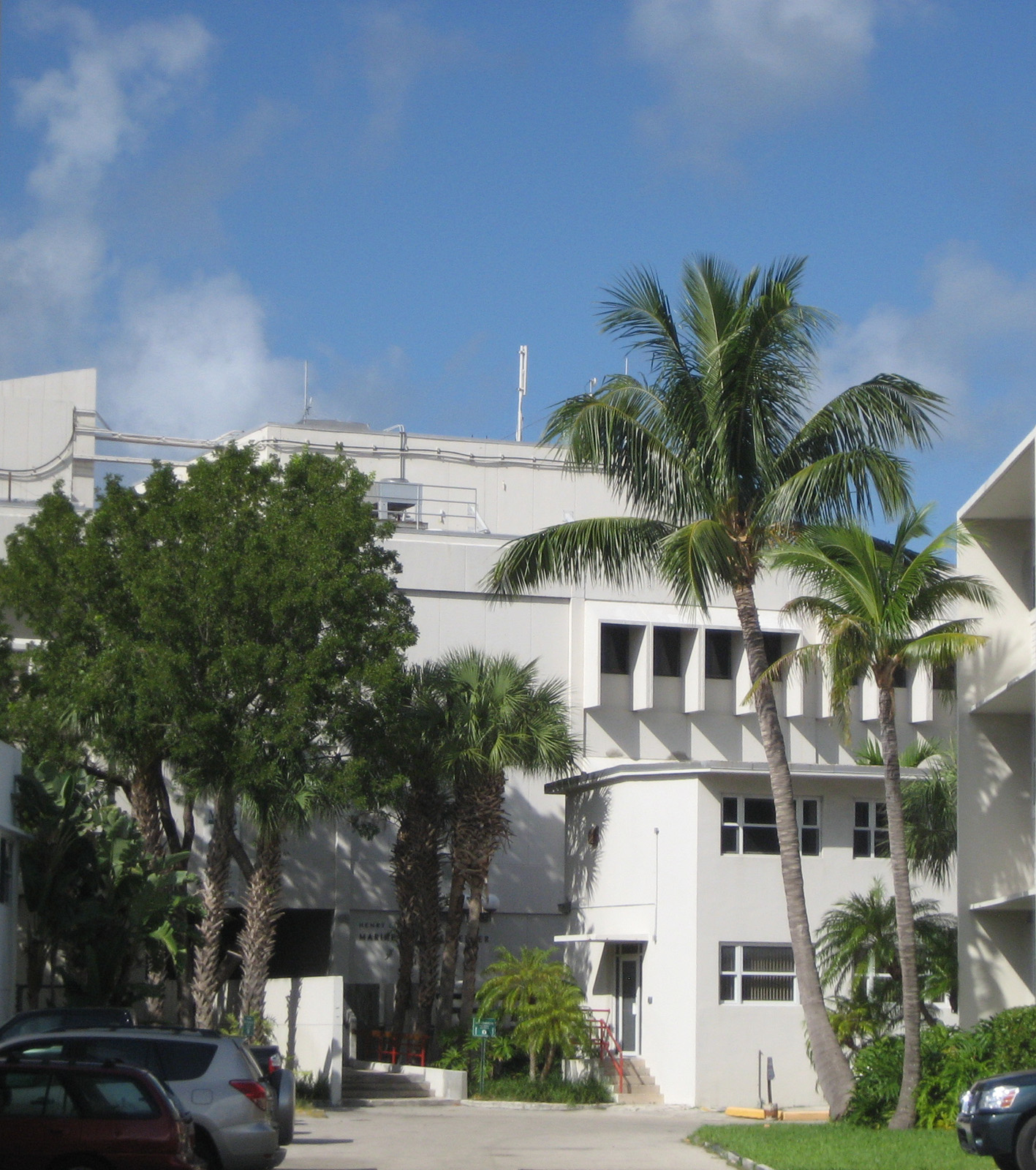
The Applied Marine Physics Building at the University of Miami's Rosenstiel School of Marine, Atmospheric, and Earth Science, located off Rickenbacker Causeway on Virginia Key in September 2007

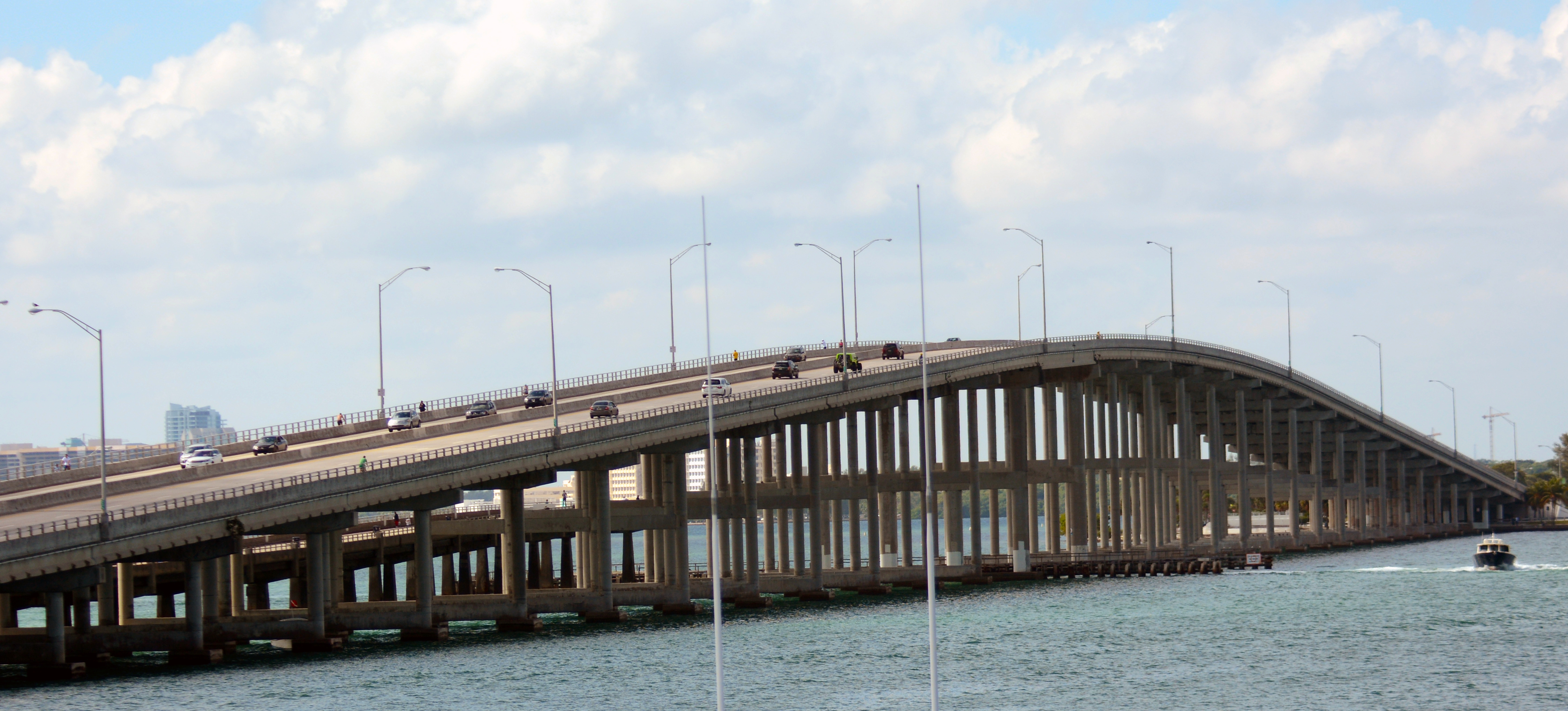
Rickenbacker Causeway in 2014

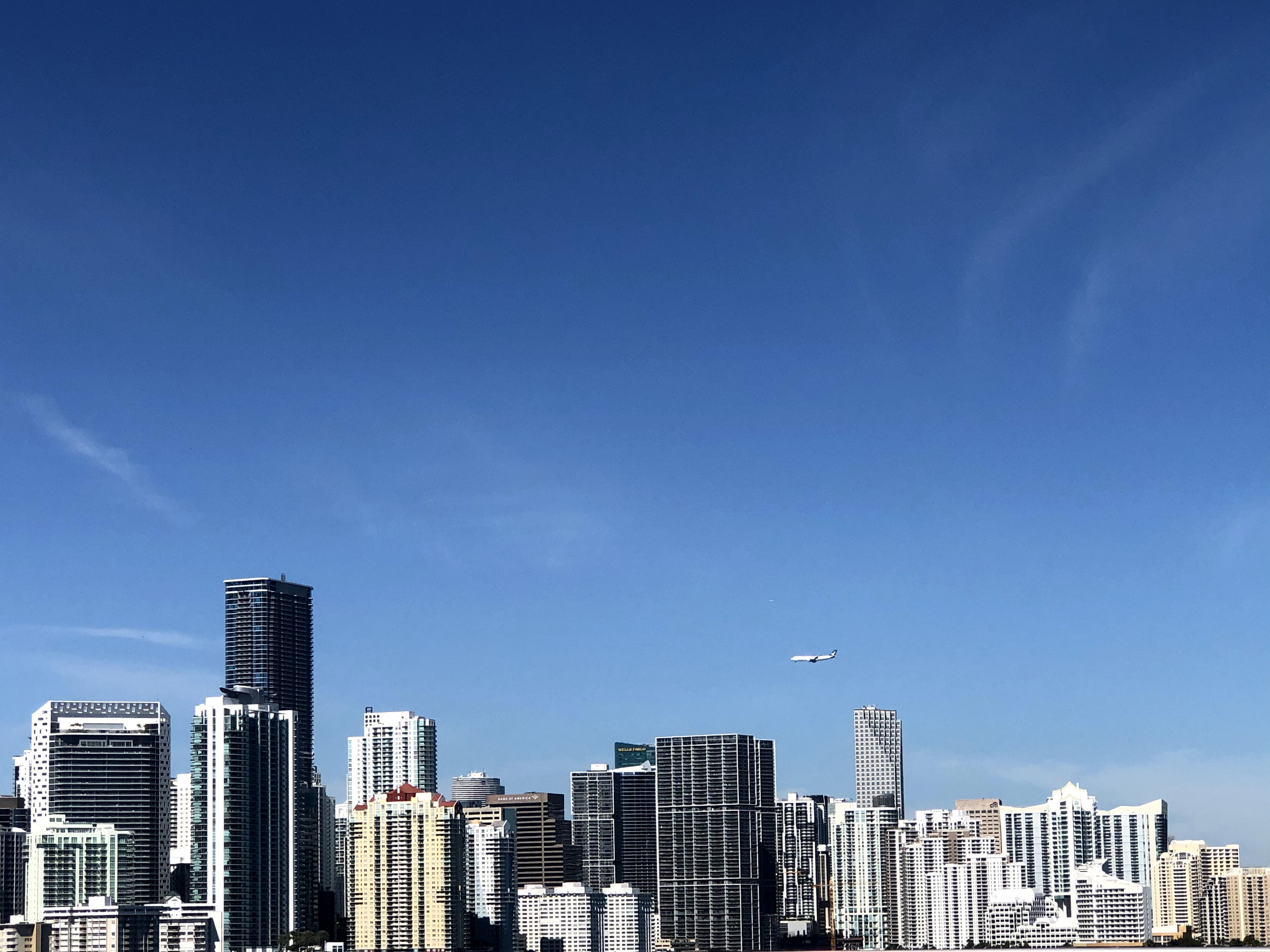
View of Downtown Miami from the bridge in January 2020

The Causeway is a toll road, owned and operated by Miami-Dade County. Automobiles traveling southbound from Miami pay a toll of US$2.25 as of 2018; northbound traffic is not charged any toll. Tolls are collected via Sunpass; C-Pass transponders or cash are no longer accepted.

In July 2021, Mayor Daniella Levine Cava proposed a renovation of major parts of the causeway including replacement of the Bear Cut Bridge and improvements to cyclist safety, recreation, and sustainability as part of a public private partnership. The Village of Key Biscayne, for which the causeway is the only ingress and egress to Miami, is participating in the process.

Also known as (unsigned) State Road 913 west of the toll plaza, the causeway's northbound continuation is a flyover ramp with forks to northbound Interstate 95 (unsigned SR 9A) and southbound South Dixie Highway (US 1/unsigned SR 5); the southbound continuation is Crandon Boulevard, which extends roughly five miles through the center of Key Biscayne, terminating near the Cape Florida Lighthouse in Bill Baggs Cape Florida State Park.

Named after Eddie Rickenbacker, the American World War I flying ace and founder and president of Miami-based Eastern Air Lines, the causeway provides access the University of Miami's Rosenstiel School of Marine, Atmospheric, and Earth Science, MAST Academy, Virginia Key Park, and Miami Marine Stadium on Virginia Key, and to Crandon Park, the Village of Key Biscayne, and Bill Baggs Cape Florida State Park on the island of Key Biscayne. Additionally, near the eastern end of the high-rise bridge over Biyscane Bay on Virginia Key used to lie the Miami Seaquarium, which closed on October 12, 2025.

== History ==
Talk of a bridge to Key Biscayne, Florida inspired by the bridges connecting Miami to Miami Beach, started in 1926. The northern two-thirds of Key Biscayne was owned by William John “W.J.” Matheson, who had established a coconut plantation on the island. In February 1926 Matheson entered into an agreement with land developer D. P. Davis to develop and re-sell the northern half of Key Biscayne, including all of what is now Crandon Park and about half of the present Village of Key Biscayne. Later in 1926 the City of Coral Gables incorporated with Key Biscayne included in its boundaries. There were dreams of a bridge to the island, making Key Biscayne the seaside resort for Coral Gables that Miami Beach had become for Miami.

In March 1926, the U.S. government auctioned off some lots on Key Biscayne that had been retained when the rest of the island was transferred to the State of Florida. The Mathesons wanted to have clear title to all of their land, and determined to outbid other interested parties for the land. They ended up paying US$58,055 for a total of 6.84 acres (2.77 ha) of land, a record price per acre for the auction of U.S. government land up to that date. Then, on September 18, 1926, the 1926 Miami Hurricane crossed over Key Biscayne on its way to Miami. While there were no deaths on the island, most of the buildings on Key Biscayne were destroyed or badly damaged, and many of the plantings were lost, including half of the coconut trees. D. P. Davis was not able to meet his end of the contract; he declared bankruptcy and then disappeared en route to Europe by ship. The Florida Land Boom was over, as were plans for a bridge.

William Matheson died in 1930, leaving the island to his children. There was a flurry of interest in 1939, when the U.S. Navy approved a proposal to develop Virginia Key as an air base and sea port. There was even talk of putting an air base on the north end of Key Biscayne, as well. In 1940 William Matheson's heirs donated 808.8 acres (327.3 ha) of land, including two miles (3.2 km) of beach on the Atlantic Ocean on the northern end of Key Biscayne to Dade County to be used as a public park (Crandon Park). The county commissioner who negotiated the gift, Charles H. Crandon, had offered for the county to build a causeway to Key Biscayne in exchange for the land donation. Planning for the air and sea complex on Virginia Key was still proceeding, and construction on a causeway to Virginia Key started in 1941. The Attack on Pearl Harbor and the entry of the United States into World War II stopped all work on the causeway and the development of Virginia Key.

After the end of World War II, Crandon pushed on with the project. He got financier Ed Ball to buy $6 million worth of bonds financing the construction of the causeway. Land for the toll plaza and the causeway entrance was bought from the estate of James Deering. Fill dredged from the bottom of Biscayne Bay and dug from the mainland were used as both the road bed and public beach areas, both to the west of Virginia Beach and on the southern reaches of the island. In November 1947 the Rickenbacker Causeway – 1.2 miles (1.9 km) of bridges and 2.7 miles (4.3 km) of roadway on fill – finally opened.

In the late 1960s and 1970s the sites along the Rickenbacker Causeway continued to increase in popularity. After increasing in the mid 1960 because of the American television series Flipper, attendance to the Miami Seaquarium soared in 1968 when it started to display Hugo, its first killer whale (two years later, Lolita became their second. The two killer whales performed together until Hugo's death in 1980). Shortly afterward, Planet Ocean, a themed tourist attraction, opened its doors. Newly integrated beaches were often crowded; the causeway near the drawbridge across the Intracoastal Waterway, and bridgeway near the mainland, became favorite fishing spots.

But popularity had a price: by 1980 it became evident that the concrete and steel structures supporting the roadway west of Virginia Key needed replacement. Five years later, the high-rise William Powell Bridge and new bridging nearest the toll plaza were built and opened at a cost of $27 million. With exception of the drawbridge (which was removed) the old bridging was left intact to serve as fishing piers. In 2011, the West Fishing Pier was demolished.

Since the opening of the new bridge, the MAST Academy took over the site of the defunct Planet Ocean (the theme attraction closed in 1991); the Virginia Key site of the City of Miami's garbage dump became a Superfund site for cleanup; the beach at Bill Baggs Cape Florida State Park was gaining in popularity; but the Miami Marine Stadium has been virtually abandoned and the Miami Seaquarium has had a series of setbacks, from being devastated by hurricanes Andrew (1992) and Wilma (2005) and being prevented from expanding by threats of legal action by the newly incorporated Village of Key Biscayne; the Seaquarium eventually closed on October 12, 2025. On the other hand, the entire length of the causeway, plus Crandon Boulevard, have become part of a popular bicycling route from Key Biscayne to Florida City.
