= 1830s Atlantic hurricane seasons =

The decade of the 1830s featured the 1830s Atlantic hurricane seasons. While data is not available for every storm that occurred, some parts of the coastline were populated enough to give data of hurricane occurrences. Each season was an ongoing event in the annual cycle of tropical cyclone formation in the Atlantic basin. Most tropical cyclone formation occurs between June 1 and November 30.

== 1830 Atlantic hurricane season ==
=== Hurricane One ===
August 3–9. A hurricane moved from Trinidad on August 3 to western Cuba by August 9.

=== Hurricane Two ===
Twin Atlantic Coast Hurricanes of 1830 August 11–19. First noted in the Leeward Islands on August 11, a hurricane moved into the Caribbean in the middle of August. It moved west-northwestward, and approached the coast of Florida. It came close to present-day Daytona Beach on August 15, but recurved northeastward before landfall, although land was not spared from effects. It made landfall near Cape Fear North Carolina on the 16th and went out to sea that night, eventually well to the north of Bermuda just offshore the Canadian Maritimes. The hurricane broke a three-month drought, but caused heavy crop damage in the process.

=== Hurricane Three ===
Twin Atlantic Coast Hurricanes of 1830 August 19–26. A hurricane tracked north of the Leeward Islands on August 19, impacting Cape Hatteras, North Carolina on August 24–25, and went up the coastline eventually striking Cape Cod, Massachusetts on August 26.

=== Hurricane Four ===
September 29-October 1. A hurricane moved from north of Puerto Rico on September 29 to well northeast of Bermuda on October 1.

=== Tropical Storm Five ===
October 6. A tropical storm struck South Carolina on October 6.

== 1831 Atlantic hurricane season ==
=== Tropical Storm One ===
June 10. A tropical storm made landfall in northeast Florida on June 10.

=== Hurricane Two ===
June 22–28. A hurricane formed circa June 22 at an unusually low latitude and moved from south Barbados to the Yucatán Peninsula by June 28.

=== Hurricane Three ===
The Great Barbados-Louisiana Hurricane of 1831 or The Great Caribbean Hurricane of 1831

August 10–17. An intense hurricane, likely of Category 4 strength left cataclysmic damage across the Caribbean. After striking Barbados on August 10, the hurricane damaged Saint Vincent (island), Saint Lucia, and Martinique. The hurricane destroyed Bridgetown (the capital of Barbados) and left 1500–2500 people dead who mostly drowned in the reported 17-foot storm surge or were crushed by collapsed buildings as the island was left desolate after the storm. The storm completely destroyed every sugar plantation on the island of St. Vincent, Saint Johns Parish church and the town of Les Cayes, Haiti, and damaged Santiago de Cuba. The storm traveled across the entire length of Cuba and damaged much of Guantanamo Bay in Cuba. The hurricane impacted South Florida and Key West between August 14 and August 15. The hurricane then drove into Louisiana near Last Island on August 17 as a category 3 hurricane. It left at least 2,500 people dead and $7 million (1831 dollars) in damage. One of the great hurricanes of the century. See List of deadliest Atlantic hurricanes.

The damage from this storm was also surveyed by British engineer William Reid and was instrumental in confirming William C. Redfield's (see 1821 Atlantic hurricane season) and John Farrar's (see 1819 Atlantic hurricane season) hypothesis that hurricanes are a spinning vortex of wind.

=== Hurricane Four ===
August 27–30. A minimal hurricane struck western Louisiana between August 27 and 30.

=== Hurricane Five ===
A hurricane hit near the mouth of the Rio Bravo del Norte, causing heavy rain over Northern Mexico.

== 1832 Atlantic hurricane season ==
=== Hurricane One ===
A hurricane moved through the Bahamas around June 5, causing 52 deaths. At Bermuda, the gale began from the northeast at 8 pm on 6 June, with the center likely passing quite close to the island as the wind shifted to southwest at 10:30 pm. The storm lasted until 3 a.m. on 7 June. Two schooners were damaged during the system.

=== Hurricane Two ===
On August 7, a hurricane struck Jamaica. On 12 August, Key West noted a tropical cyclone. The cyclone moved across the eastern Gulf of Mexico, striking northwest Florida. It then recurved through the American South, moving through South Carolina by August 18.

=== Tropical Storm Three ===
On August 21, someone witnessed a tropical storm west-southwest of Cape Verde in the eastern tropical Atlantic.

=== Hurricane Four ===
A hurricane on August 23–27, moved from the central Leeward Islands to the east of Jamaica.

=== Tropical Storm Five ===
On October 14, a tropical storm moved into South Carolina.

== 1833 Atlantic hurricane season ==
=== Tropical Storm One ===
A tropical storm impacted South Carolina on August 10.

=== Tropical Storm Two ===
A tropical storm hit Saint Kitts on August 14 and continued northward into the Atlantic during the next several more days.

=== Hurricane Three ===
A hurricane passed offshore of North Carolina and Norfolk, Virginia, on August 21 keeping ships at harbor but causing no damage.

=== Hurricane Four ===
A hurricane impacted western Louisiana between September 4 and 5.

=== Tropical Storm Five ===
A tropical storm struck South Carolina on September 14, the second one of the season.

=== Hurricane Six ===
A hurricane impacted the entire East Coast in early October reaching New York on October 13.

=== Tropical Storm Seven ===
A tropical storm from the Gulf of Mexico impacted Cuba during October 18–19.

== 1834 Atlantic hurricane season ==
=== Hurricane One ===
The South Carolina Hurricane of 1834 On September 4 a hurricane hit South Carolina, causing 37 deaths. It moved through North Carolina and Virginia, capsizing the ship E Pluribus Unum. The crew made it safely to shore.

=== Hurricane Two ===
A hurricane impacted Louisiana on September 6.

=== Hurricane Three ===
The Padre Ruiz Hurricane of 1834 A hurricane struck the island of Dominica on September 20, bringing heavy winds and a 12 feet (3.7 m) storm surge that devastated the capital of Roseau; 230 people are believed to have been killed by the hurricane's onslaught. Then the hurricane made its second landfall at Santo Domingo, Dominican Republic on the September 23. About 170 sailors died when their ships sank in the Ozama River. On land the hurricane disrupted the funeral service of Padre Ruiz, a Roman Catholic priest. A total of 400 people were killed from the hurricane. May have later impacted Louisiana on September 29.

=== Hurricane Four ===
The Galveston Hurricane of 1834 In September, a hurricane hit Mexican Texas, causing heavy damage. This or another severe tropical cyclone struck Galveston, Texas.

== 1835 Atlantic hurricane season ==
=== Hurricane One ===
The Antigua-Gulf of Mexico-Rio Grande Hurricane of 1835 or Hurricane San Hipólito of 1835 A hurricane was first detected near Antigua on August 12. It crossed through Puerto Rico from southwest to north on August 13, damaging Fuerte de San José, and north of the Dominican Republic, and Cuba, causing at least 3 casualties. It moved across the Florida Straits and the Gulf of Mexico, hitting near the mouth of the Rio Grande on August 18. There, it destroyed small villages, caused strong storm surge, and killed 18 people.

=== Hurricane Two ===
September 2–13. A strong hurricane hit Cape Florida and Key Biscayne, damaging the Cape Florida lighthouse. It may have first opened the Narrows Cut (later named Norris Cut) between Virginia Key and Fisher Island, in conjunction with the next hurricane a week later. The hurricane then moved into the Gulf of Mexico and took a hard northeast turn, damaging Fort Brooke in Tampa, Florida as it passed by, then moving northward into Georgia, South and North Carolina. making the trip "all the way into New England."

=== Hurricane Three ===
The Key West Hurricane of 1835 September 15–19. First detected in the vicinity of Jamaica on September 12 and crossed central Cuba on the September 14. The hurricane struck Key West during September 14 and 15. This is the first solid account of hurricane activity in Key West island as the island was sparsely populated prior to 1830. The hurricane story published in the Key West Inquirer newspaper, which had only been in publication for one year up to that point. The lightship Florida at Carysfort Reef was severely damaged. Norris Cut between Key Biscayne and Virginia Key, possibly first opened by the previous hurricane, may have been further enlarged by this storm. The newly built and not yet lit Ponce de Leon Inlet Light was destroyed by the storm as it passed up the Florida coast. The hurricane then moved northward into South Carolina.

=== Hurricane Four ===
October 22–29. A hurricane impacted Turks and Caicos Islands on October 22 and continued onwards making landfall at South Carolina on October 29.

== 1836 Atlantic hurricane season ==
=== Hurricane One ===
A minimal hurricane swept through Woodstock, New Brunswick, on July 27, 1836. Likely a Category 1.

=== Hurricane Two ===
A hurricane struck the Cayman Islands between October 2 and 3

=== Hurricane Three ===
A hurricane struck eastern North Carolina between October 10 and 11 doing great damage.

== 1837 Atlantic hurricane season ==
Note: Lt. Col. William Red of the Royal Engineers was able to map eleven storms during the 1837 season in his book "Law of Storms" published in 1838.

=== Tropical Storm One ===
On July 9 and 10, a tropical storm impacted Barbados.

=== Hurricane Two ===
On July 26, a storm hit Martinique and Barbados. As a hurricane, the system moved ashore in southern Florida and then through the northeast Gulf of Mexico into Alabama by August 5. It caused 57 deaths.

=== Hurricane Three ===
The Antigua-Florida Hurricane of 1837 or Hurricane Nuestra Señora de Los Angeles of 1837. A hurricane passed by Antigua on August 1. The storm then entered Humacao, Puerto Rico, around 5–6 pm 2 August, and left the island through Vega Baja, Puerto Rico, and Dorado, Puerto Rico, ten to twelve hours later (3–6 am 3 August). The eye passed very near San Juan, Puerto Rico, where the barometric pressure (available for the first time in Puerto Rico) registered 28.00 inches of mercury (94.8 kPa). The hurricane sunk all ships in the Bay of San Juan. The worst damages occurred in the northeastern part of the island. Thereafter, the tropical cyclone moved northwest to the Florida/Georgia border before recurving through the western Carolinas on August 7.

=== Hurricane Four ===
The Calypso Hurricane A tropical system was observed east of the West Indies on August 13. It moved through the islands and passed the Bahamas on August 16. While recurving, it hit the North Carolina coast on August 18. It slowly moved over land, causing 48 hours of strong winds, and moved back offshore into the Atlantic on 20 August, bypassing southern New England by August 22.

=== Tropical Storm Five ===
A tropical storm moved east of Bermuda on August 21.

=== Hurricane Six ===
The Apalachee Bay Storm A hurricane moved east-northeast from the Gulf of Mexico on August 31, struck Apalachee Bay, and moved just offshore the Carolinas by 2 September.

=== Hurricane Seven ===
The Bahamas Hurricane of 1837 A tropical storm formed near the northern Bahamas on September 13. It moved northeast through the western Atlantic Ocean on 15 September.

=== Tropical Storm Eight ===
A tropical storm moved across Saint Augustine, Florida, affecting northeast Florida between September 24 and the 26th.

=== Hurricane Nine ===
A hurricane was noted near Bermuda on October 1 to 3.

=== Hurricane Ten ===
Racer's hurricane

This hurricane caused 105 deaths on a 2,000 mile track from the Caribbean to Texas to North Carolina. Racer's storm named for a British warship which encountered the storm in the northwest Caribbean, was one of the most destructive storms of the 19th century. The British ship Racer survived the hurricane and went into Havana for repairs and provided valuable information on hurricanes to William Reid.

Racer's storm started as a tropical storm moved across the western Caribbean Sea in late September. It first formed near Jamaica on 26–27 September., moved across the Yucatán Peninsula, and struck the western Gulf of Mexico where it struck near Brownsville, Texas, on October 2. It stalled near the coast for three days and then recurved to the east hitting Galveston, Texas, Louisiana, Mississippi, Alabama, Georgia, Pensacola, Florida, and South and North Carolina. It ultimately moved into the Atlantic Ocean on October 11. The hurricane caused destruction all over the Gulf of Mexico including destroying the Mexican Navy and several U.S. ships. During the storm, a paddle boat named Home headed to Charleston ran into the hurricane off of Cape Hatteras. The boat sank with 90 people on board with only 40 surviving and there were only two life preservers on board the boat. As a result of this sinking, U.S. Congress passed a law from this storm mandating the every vessel in the future must have at least enough life preservers for every passenger on board.

=== Tropical Storm Eleven ===
A tropical storm crossed central Cuba on October 26, moving north-northeast offshore the coast of the Southeast United States through October 29.

== 1838 Atlantic hurricane season ==
=== Tropical Storm One ===
During May 20–21, a tropical storm traveled offshore west of Jamaica.

=== Tropical Storm Two ===
On June 3, a tropical storm struck South Carolina.

=== Hurricane Three ===
June 15–21. During the middle of June, a minimal hurricane moved from the Straits of Florida to make landfall at South Carolina on June 21.

=== Hurricane Four ===
July 29–August 12. During the early August, a hurricane moved from the northeast Caribbean sea and into the Gulf of Mexico to make landfall at Texas around August 12.

=== Hurricane Five ===
August 30–September 13. On August 30, a hurricane struck Barbados and continued to travel to offshore of the U.S. East Coast during early September.

=== Hurricane Six ===
September 2–4. During early September, a hurricane moved in the Atlantic between offshore U.S. East Coast and offshore west of Bermuda.

=== Hurricane Seven ===
On September 7, a hurricane hit near Cape Florida, causing 38 deaths.

=== Tropical Storm Eight ===
September 28–30. On September 28, a tropical storm struck South Carolina and continued to moved off the southeast U.S. Coast over the next few days.

=== Hurricane Nine ===
A late season hurricane hit the east coast of Mexico on November 1, sinking two U.S. ships.

=== Hurricanes Ten and Eleven ===
Two hurricanes hit Cayman Islands causing significant damage in 1838 or 1837 on September 28 and around October 25. The year is disputed due to conflicting reports.

== 1839 Atlantic hurricane season ==
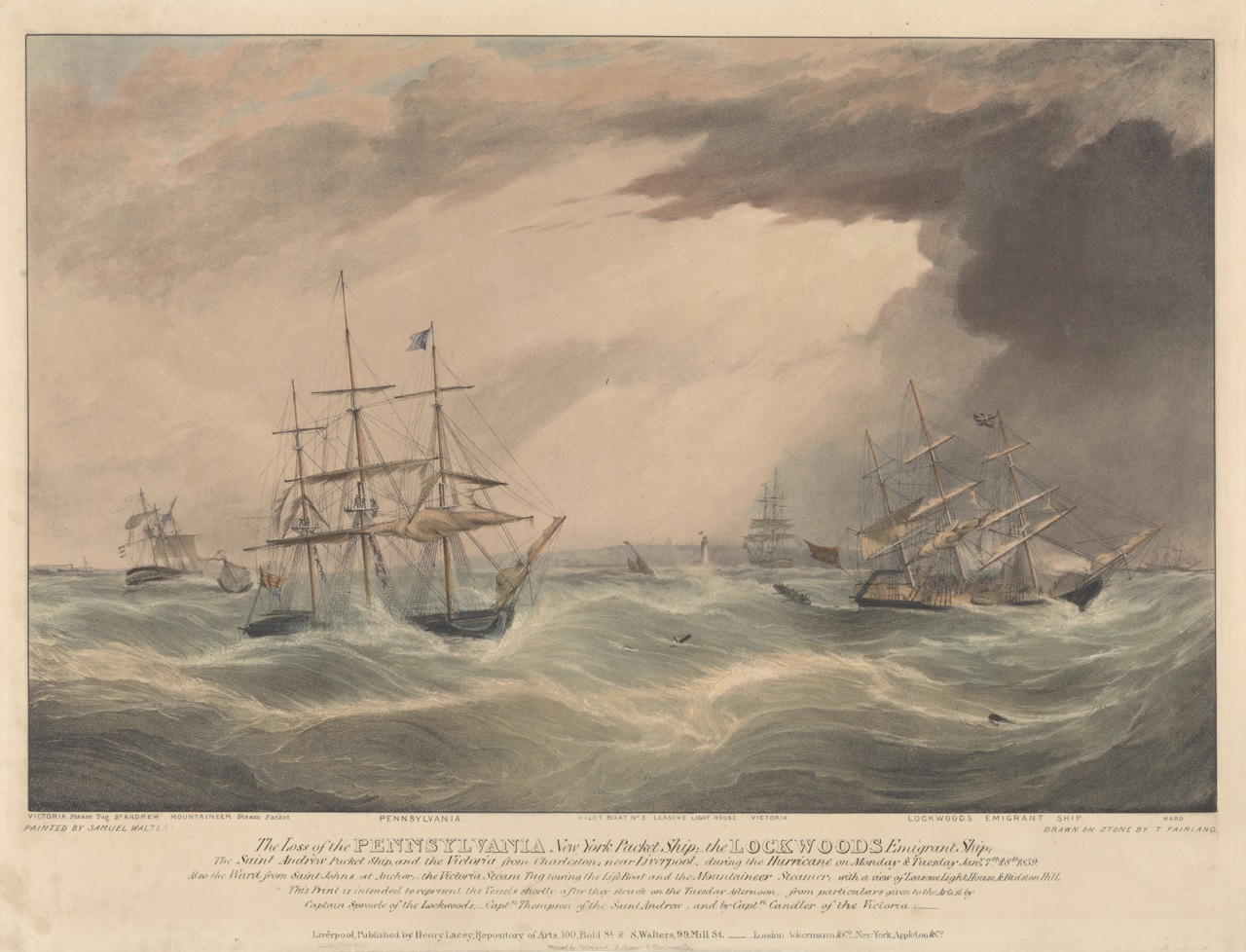
The Loss of the Pennsylvania New York Packet Ship- the Lockwoods Emigrant Ship; the Saint Andrew Packet Ship, and the Victoria from Charleston, near Liverpool during the Hurricane on Monday and Tuesday 7-8th January 1839. The storm had reached Hurricane force over Ireland on the 6th of January

=== Hurricane One ===
The Atlantic Coast Hurricane of 1839 August 23-September 1. A hurricane hit Charleston, South Carolina, on August 28. It passed over North Carolina and Virginia before going out to sea on the 30th.

=== Hurricane Two ===
Reid's Hurricane September 7–14. The system moved from east of the West Indies into the southwest Atlantic. Swells were noted as early as September 9 at Bermuda. During late on the September 11 and early on September 12, this hurricane struck Bermuda. The storm tide was measured as 11 feet (3.4 meters). Thousands of trees were downed. The tower on Tower Hill was leveled. Damage done to private property totaled 8,000 pounds sterling (1839 pounds). The hurricane last struck at Newfoundland, Canada on September 14 before dissipating. This was one of the first hurricanes to be studied by William Reid in person, in this case as governor of the island the year after his publication of "The Law of Storms" (from Beware the Hurricane).

=== Tropical Storm Three ===
September 11–16. During the middle of September, a storm approached the coast of Louisiana. The tropical storm struck near Lake Charles, then known as Charley's Lake, on September 15.

=== Hurricane Four ===
November 5. A late season hurricane hit Galveston, Texas, on November 5.

== See also ==
- Atlantic hurricane season
- Lists of Atlantic hurricanes
