= Crandon Park =

Public park in Florida, US

Coordinates: 25°42′36.79″N 80°9′23.12″W

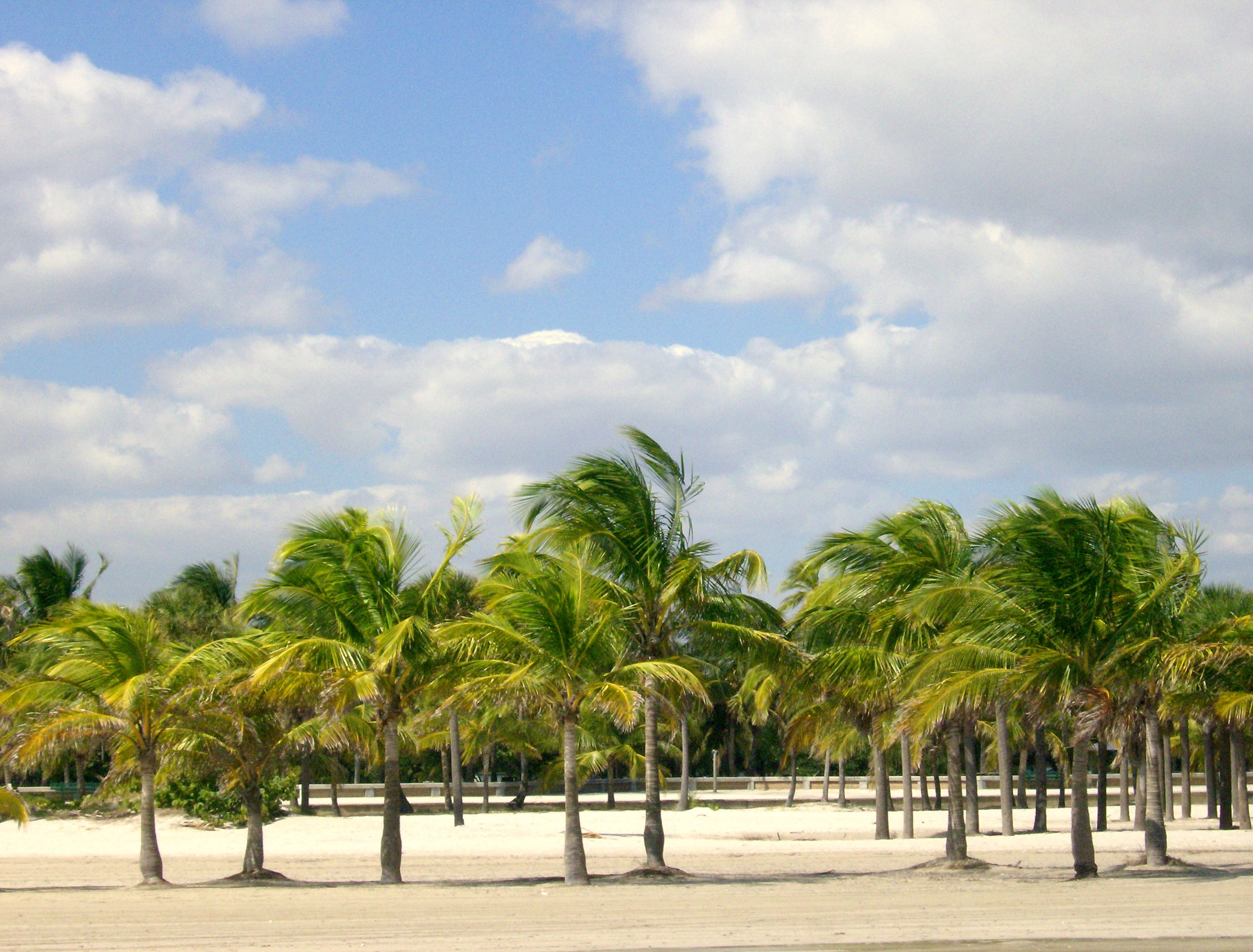
- Crandon Park beach in Key Biscayne, Florida
- Interactive map of Crandon Park
- Type: Municipal
- Location: 6747 Crandon Boulevard; Key Biscayne, Miami, Florida, United States
- Area: 808.8 acres (3.273 km^{2})
- Created: 1947
- Operator: Miami-Dade Parks and Recreation Department
- Parking: Over 3000 spaces
- Website: Crandon Park

Crandon Park is an 808-acre (3.27 km^{2}) urban park in metropolitan Miami, occupying the northern part of Key Biscayne. It is connected to mainland Miami via the Rickenbacker Causeway.

== History ==
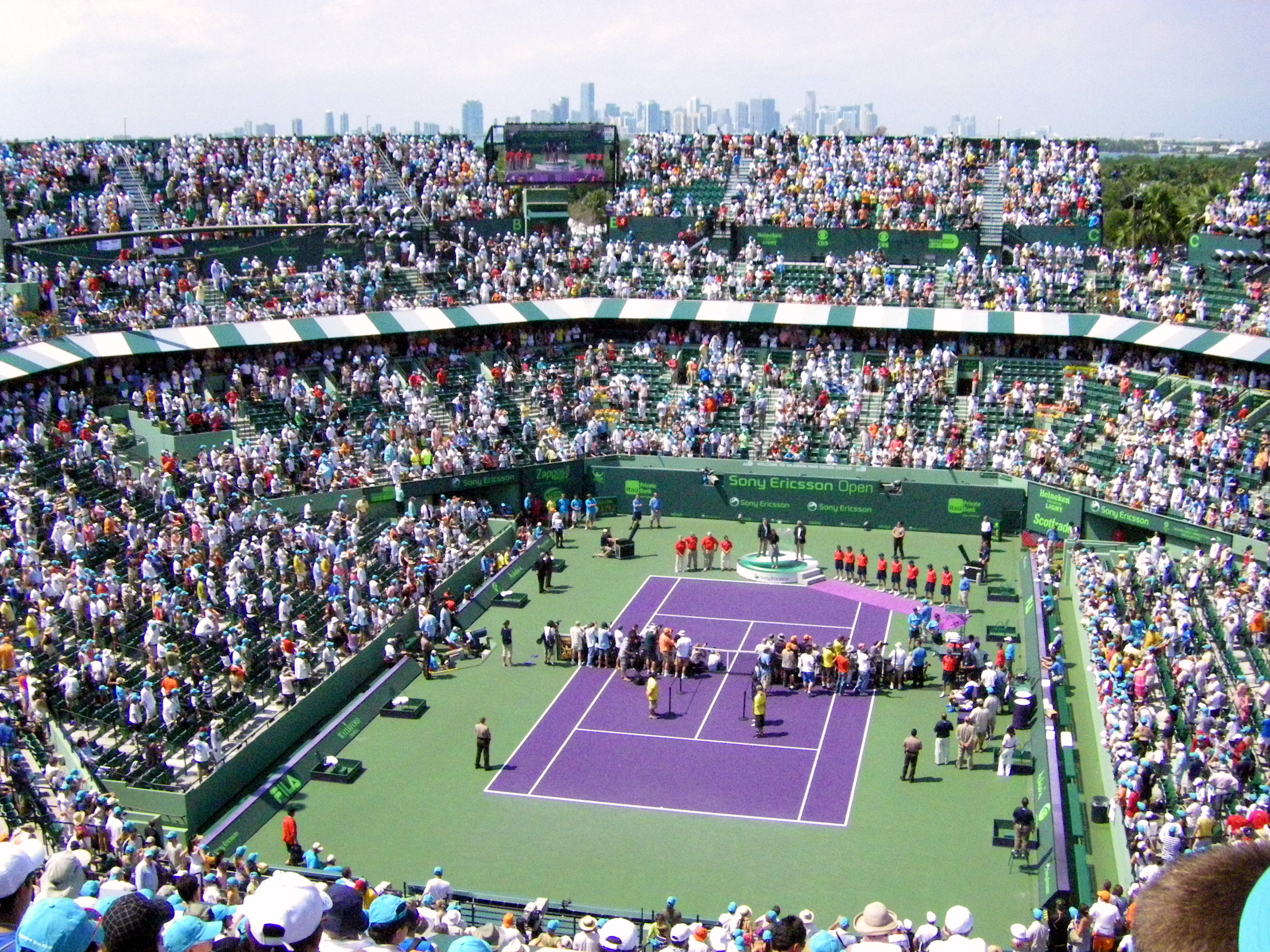
Just south of Downtown Miami (in background), Crandon Park was home to the Miami Open from 1987 to 2018.

Fisher Island and South Beach seen from Crandon in August 2006

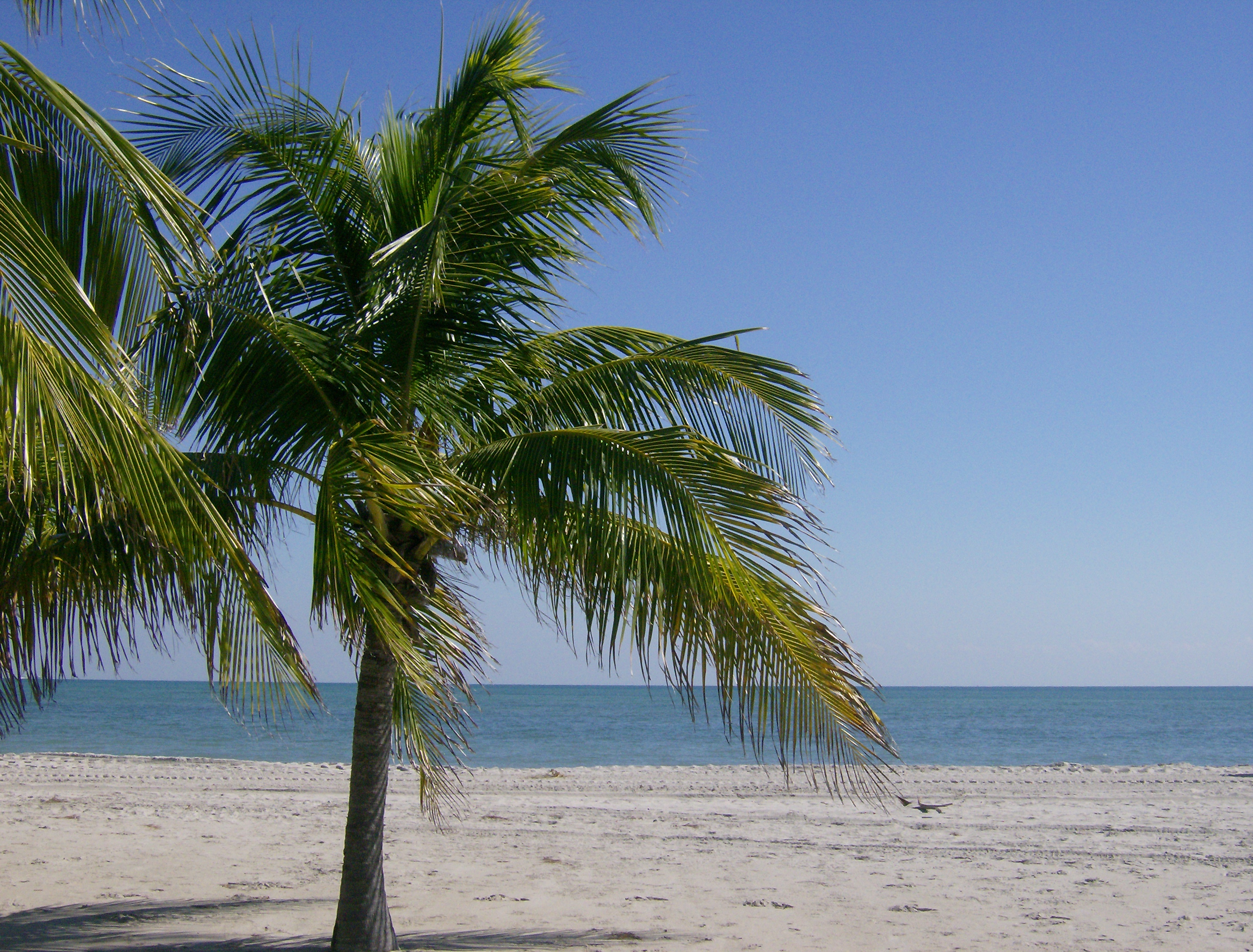
The Atlantic Ocean seen from the Crandon Park beach in February 2008

The land Crandon Park occupies was once part of the largest coconut plantation in the United States, operated by William John Matheson and his heirs. In 1940 the Matheson family donated 808.8 acres (327.3 ha) of their land to Dade County (now Miami-Dade County) for a public park. In return, county commissioner Charles H. Crandon promised that the county would build a causeway to Key Biscayne. World War II delayed construction, but the causeway opened in 1947.

Crandon Park included a zoo, occupying 48 acres (19 ha) of the park. The first animals in the zoo, including some lions, an elephant and a rhinoceros, had been stranded when a circus went out of business in Miami. Some Galapagos tortoises, monkeys and pheasants were added from the Matheson plantation. Other animals were added, including a white Bengal tiger. In 1981 the Crandon Park Zoo was moved from the park to a location south of Miami, and became the Miami MetroZoo, later renamed the Miami-Dade Zoological Park and Gardens.

== Facilities ==
The park is more than 800 acres (320 ha) in size, and has 2 miles (3.2 km) of beach on the Atlantic Ocean side. Crandon Boulevard extends from the end of the Rickenbacker Causeway through the length of the park, providing access to the Village of Key Biscayne and Bill Baggs Cape Florida State Park.

The park has a variety of facilities, including a marina, a golf course, the Tennis Center at Crandon Park, a family amusement center, picnic shelters and a nature center. There is parking for more than 3,000 vehicles in the park. Part of the park is set aside as the Bear Cut Preserve, a designated natural Environment Study Area. Guided tours through the preserve are available.

== Marjory Stoneman Douglas Biscayne Nature Center ==
The Marjory Stoneman Douglas Biscayne Nature Center, also known as Biscayne Nature Center, is located at the north end of Crandon Park. Features include natural history exhibits, demonstration lab classroom facilities, an audio visual presentation room and a gift shop. The center is a project of Miami-Dade County Public Schools, Miami-Dade County Parks and Recreation Department and the not-for-profit community support group.
