= Cynthia Cooley =

American painter

Cynthia F. Cooley (born July 17, 1931) is a Pittsburgh artist.

She was born Cynthia Jean Furber in Minneapolis, Minnesota. She graduated Phi Beta Kappa from Lawrence University, which honored her with the 1997 Distinguished Career Achievement Award. She also studied at the Boston Museum of Fine Arts School and the Minneapolis College of Art and Design. She was married to the late professor emeritus William W. Cooley.

Cooley is best known for her vivid paintings of steel mill interiors and of Pittsburgh's hillside neighborhoods and industrial valleys. She says she was “originally drawn to the powerful geometric forms of the working mills.” She also has captured another of western Pennsylvania's industries in her series of coal mine paintings. She works mostly in acrylic and watercolors to create memorable works from her own on-site sketches and photographs. As a lifelong traveler, Cooley's paintings also reflect the many places she has visited, ranging from her watercolors of Giverny to her acrylics of doorways in Tunisia. In 1989, she accompanied the American Wind Symphony Orchestra as the artist-in-residence as they sailed on the waterways of northern Europe.

Cooley has had over 45 individual exhibitions in 8 states, including one at the National Academy of Sciences in Washington, D.C., and has received over 25 awards in group exhibitions. In 1989, she won Artist of the Year at the Pittsburgh Center for the Arts. She was named a "Master Artist" in Pittsburgh in 1998. In 2003, Cooley was one of the selected artists who participated in the DinoMite Days event sponsored by the Carnegie Museum of Natural History. In honor of Pittsburgh's “historical connection to dinosaurs and to world-class scientific research,” Cooley transformed a Stegosaurus sculpture into a cityscape tribute to her hometown of Pittsburgh. Her dinosaur, which was displayed outdoors to the public, was named “Troyus Hillosaurus,” and displayed a view of Troy Hill from downtown Pittsburgh on one side, and a view of downtown from Troy Hill on the other.

Over 1,860 of Cooley's works are in private collections, and over 90 are in public and corporate collections, including:

- Carnegie Museum of Art
- Pennsylvania State Museum
- Westmoreland Museum of American Art
- Butler Institute of American Art
- University of Pittsburgh
- Senator John Heinz Pittsburgh Regional History Center
- Pennsylvania State University Earth & Mineral Sciences Museum
- Pittsburgh Public Schools
- The Duquesne Club
