= Fowey Rocks Light =

Lighthouse on Key Biscayne, Florida, United States

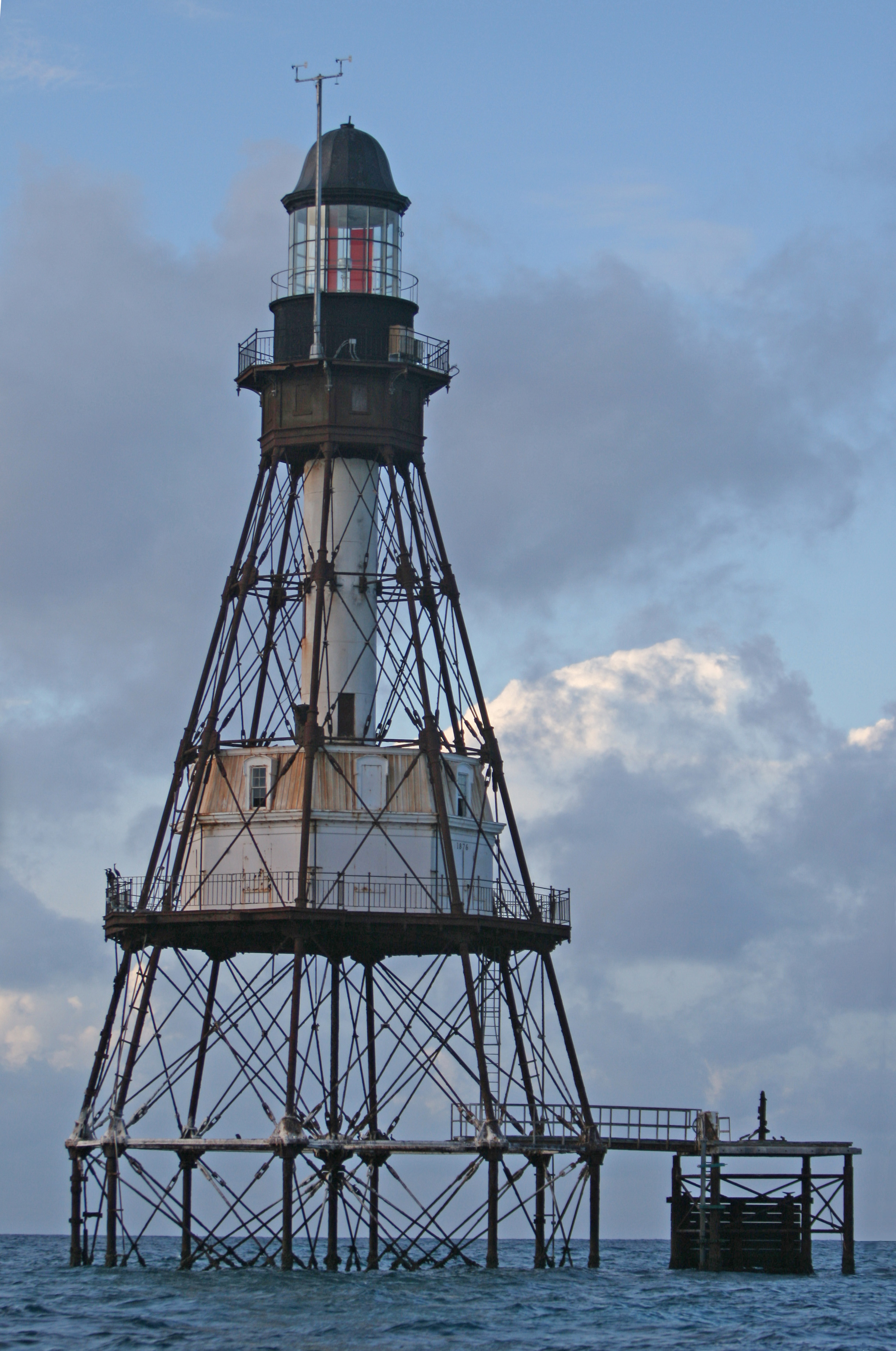
- Location: Seven miles southeast of Cape Florida on Key Biscayne
- Coordinates: 25°35′26.2″N 80°05′48″W

Tower
- Foundation: Screw-pile
- Construction: Cast-iron
- Automated: May 7, 1975
- Height: 34 m (112 ft)
- Shape: Skeletal octagonal pyramid
- Markings: Brown and white
- Heritage: National Register of Historic Places listed place
- Racon: "O" (Oscar)

Light
- First lit: 1878
- Focal height: 110 feet (34 m)
- Lens: 1878: 1st order drum Fresnel lens 1982: Flash tube array 1983: 300mm Current: VRB-25 system
- Range: White 15 nautical miles (28 km; 17 mi), red 10 nautical miles (19 km; 12 mi)
- Characteristic: Flashing white 10s with two red sectors
- Fowey Rocks Light
- U.S. National Register of Historic Places
- Location within Florida
- NRHP reference No.: 10001181
- Added to NRHP: January 26, 2011

Fowey Rocks Light is located seven miles southeast of Cape Florida on Key Biscayne. The lighthouse was completed in 1878, replacing the Cape Florida Light. It was automated on May 7, 1975, and as of 2021 is still in operation. The structure is cast iron, with a screw-pile foundation, a platform and a skeletal tower. The light is 110 feet above the water. The tower framework is painted brown, while the dwelling and enclosed circular stair to the lantern are painted white. The original lens was a first-order drum Fresnel lens which stood about 12 feet (4 m) high and weighed about a ton (tonne). The light has a nominal range of 15 miles in the white sectors, and 10 miles in the red sectors. It serves as a maker for the entrance to the Hawk Channel passage through the Florida Keys.

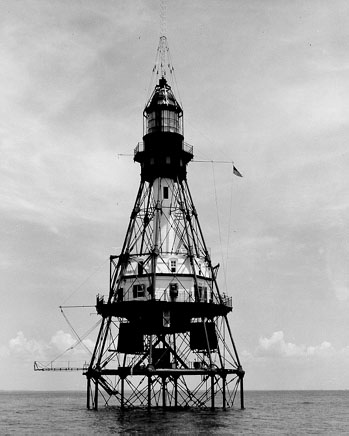
Fowey Rocks Lighthouse, U.S. Coast Guard Archive

Fowey Rocks are named after the Royal Navy frigate HMS Fowey which was wrecked on a different reef to the south in 1748. During construction of the lighthouse the workers lived on a platform built over the water to minimize the danger of transporting them and their supplies each day from the mainland. While construction was under way, on 17 February 1878 the Arratoon Apcar ran aground on the reef. The 1500 ton steamship came to rest just 200 yards (180 m) from the workmen's platform. Efforts to save the boat failed, and she was pounded apart on the rocks and sank. Today the wreck is an excellent scuba diving site. One early assistant keeper of the lighthouse, Jefferson B. Browne, later became Chief Justice of the Florida Supreme Court.

The Labor Day Hurricane of 1935 washed away the first deck of the lighthouse, 15 feet above the water, but the tower survived. The lighthouse is inside the boundaries of Biscayne National Park.

In June 2011, the General Services Administration made the Fowey Rocks Light (along with 11 others) available at no cost to public organizations willing to preserve them. On October 2, 2012, the National Park Service accepted ownership of the light.

It is the last of the original Florida Keys offshore staffed reef lights in operation, all others having been decommissioned by 2015. The original Fresnel lens has been replaced by a modern solar-powered light. Although owned by the National Park Service, as of 2021, the light continued to be maintained by the US Coast Guard.
