= William W. Cooley =

American educational researcher and author (1930–2024)

William W. Cooley (March 20, 1930 – July 17, 2024) was an American educational researcher and author who was a professor emeritus of the University of Pittsburgh.

== Life and career ==
Cooley was born in West Bend, Wisconsin on March 20, 1930. He earned a bachelor's degree in chemistry at Lawrence University in 1952, a master's degree in science education and statistics at the University of Minnesota in 1955, and a doctorate in science education, statistics, and measurement at Harvard University in 1958. He was married to artist Cynthia Cooley.

Cooley had been involved in educational research since 1955, and authored or co-authored numerous books, over 20 book chapters and over 100 journal articles and other written works. His special interests lay in educational evaluation and research, as well as in improving schools. His later work focused particularly on "the lack of equity, and the resulting educational bankruptcy, inherent in Pennsylvania's school financing structure." Cooley first came to the University of Pittsburgh to hold to position of Director of Project TALENT. He then served as the co-director of the university's Learning Research and Development Center (LRDC) from 1969 to 1977. While with the LRDC, he served as:

- director, Pennsylvania Educational Policy Studies
- director, the School of Education's Administrative and Policy Studies Computer Laboratory
- co-coordinator, the Administrative and Policy Studies’ Policy, Planning, and Evaluation Studies degree program

From 1972 to 1973, Cooley was a fellow at the Center for Advanced Study in the Behavioral Sciences at Stanford University. He also served as president of the American Educational Research Association (AERA) from 1982 to 1983. In 2008, Cooley was inducted into the inaugural class of AERA fellows—along with five other Pitt faculty—for "exceptional scientific or scholarly contributions to education research or...to the field through development of research opportunities."

Cooley died on July 17, 2024, at the age of 94.

== Works ==
- Klopfer, Leopold E. and Cooley, William W. (1961) Use of case histories in the development of student understanding of science and scientists Google Books
- Cooley, William W. and Lohnes, Paul R. (1962) Multivariate Procedures for the Behavioral Sciences Google Books
- Cooley, William W. (1963) Career Development of Scientists: An Overlapping Longitudinal Study Google Books
- University of Pittsburgh, Project Talent; Identification, Development, and Utilization of Human Talents (John C. Flanagan, Responsible Investigator / William W. Cooley, Project Director, 1965) Google Books
- University of Pittsburgh, Project Talent; One-Year Follow-Up Studies (John C. Flanagan, Responsible Investigator / William W. Cooley, Project Director, 1966) Google Books
- Cooley, William W. and Lohnes, Paul R. (1968) Predicting development of young adults: Project TALENT five-year follow-up studies Google Books
- Lohnes, Paul R. and Cooley, William W. (1968) Introduction to Statistical Procedures: With Computer Exercises Google Books
- Cooley, William W. and Lohnes, Paul R. (1971) Multivariate Data Analysis Google Books
- Cooley, William W. and Lohnes, Paul R. (1976) Evaluation Research in Education Google Books
- Cooley, William W. and Bickel, William E. (1986) Decision-Oriented Educational Research Google Books
