= Key Biscayne =

Island in Florida, United States

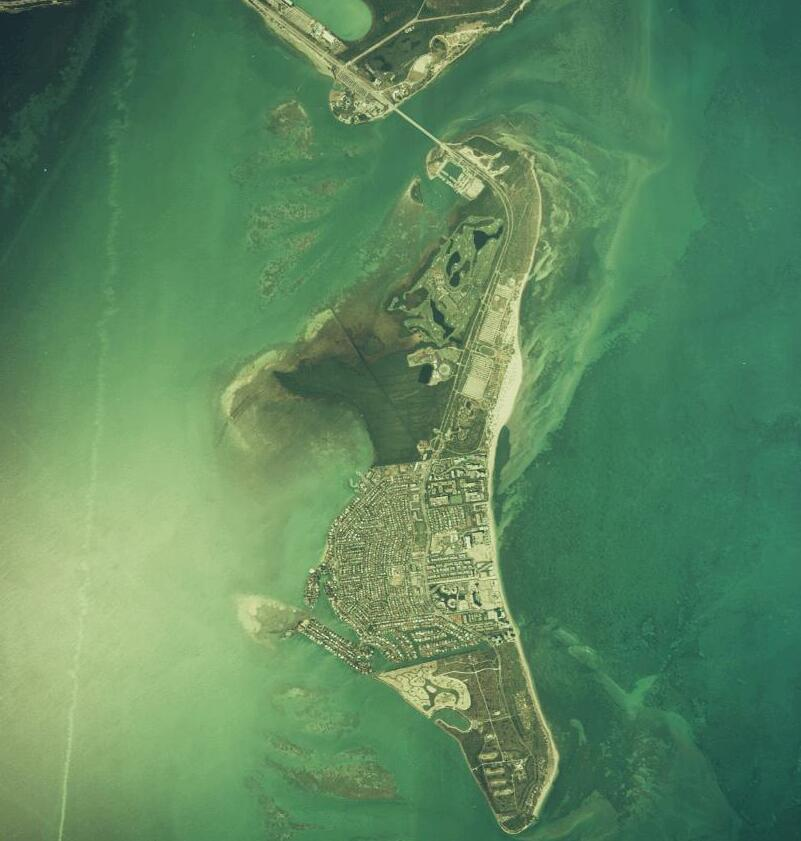
- Aerial view of Key Biscayne in 1999

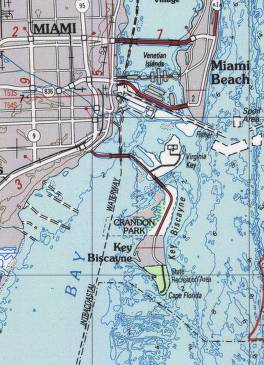
- Map of Key Biscayne

- Key Biscayne Key Biscayne (the United States)

Geography
- Location: Miami-Dade County, Florida, U.S.
- Coordinates: 25°41′25″N 80°09′54″W
- Length: 5 mi (8 km)
- Width: 1.5 mi (2.4 km)
- Highest elevation: 5 ft (1.5 m)

Administration
- United States

Key Biscayne (Spanish: Cayo Vizcaíno) is an island located in Miami-Dade County, Florida, located between the Atlantic Ocean and Biscayne Bay. It is the southernmost of the barrier islands along the Atlantic coast of Florida, and lies south of Miami Beach and southeast of Miami. The key is connected to Miami via the Rickenbacker Causeway, originally built in 1947.

The northern portion of Key Biscayne is home to Crandon Park, a county park. The middle section of the island consists of the incorporated Village of Key Biscayne. The southern part of the island is now protected as Bill Baggs Cape Florida State Park, adjacent to Biscayne National Park, one of the two national parks in Miami-Dade County.

== Name ==
The Spanish Hernando de Escalante Fontaneda related that a sailor from the Bay of Biscay, in what is now the northern coast of Spain, had lived on the lower east coast of Florida for a while after being shipwrecked. A 17th-century map shows Cayo de Biscainhos, the probable origin of Key Biscayne.

== Geography ==
Key Biscayne, although named a "key", is not geologically part of the Florida Keys, but is a barrier island composed of sand eroded from the Appalachian Mountains, carried to the coast by rivers and then moved along the coast from the north by coastal currents. The eastern edge of Key Biscayne is underlain by the Key Largo Limestone, a fossilized ancient reef that is exposed in the upper and middle Florida Keys. Elsewhere, there is no hard bedrock near the surface of the island, only layers of weak sandstone to depths of 100 feet (30 m) or more. The coastal transport of sand southward ends at Key Biscayne. In the 1850s, Louis Agassiz noted that "[s]outh of Cape Florida no more silicacious sand is to be seen." (The beaches in the Florida Keys, by contrast, consist primarily of finely pulverized shells.) Geologists believe that the island emerged around 2000 BCE, soon after the sea level stopped rising, as the sand built up to form new barrier islands on the southern Florida coast.

Key Biscayne is elongated in the north–south direction, tapering to a point at each end. It is approximately 5 miles (8.0 km) long and 1 to 2 miles (1.6 to 3.2 km) wide. The northern end of the island is separated from another barrier island, Virginia Key, by Bear Cut. The southern end of the island is Cape Florida. The Cape Florida Channel separates the island from the Safety Valve, an expanse of shallow flats cut by tidal channels that extends southward about 9 miles (14 km) to the Ragged Keys, at the northern end of the Florida Keys.

Only Soldier Key, approximately 200 by 100 yards (183 by 91 m) wide, lies between Key Biscayne and the Ragged Keys. The Cape Florida Channel, 10 to 11 feet (3.0 to 3.4 m) deep in 1849, and Bear Cut, 4 feet (1.2 m) deep in 1849, are the deepest natural channels into Biscayne Bay. They provided the only access for ocean-going vessels to Biscayne Bay until artificial channels were dredged starting early in the 20th century. In 1849 the island had a fine sandy beach on the east side, and mangroves and lagoons on the west side. The average elevation of the island is less than five feet (1.5 m) above sea level.

Key Biscayne is located at 25°41′25″N 80°9′54″W (25.690329, -80.165118).

== History ==
=== Early history ===
The first known indigenous inhabitants of Key Biscayne were Tequestas. Shells, bones and artifacts found on the island indicate extensive use of it by the Tequesta. A large community appeared to inhabit the island between 1,500 and 2,000 years ago. In 1992 Hurricane Andrew scoured much of the vegetation from the southern end of Key Biscayne. An archaeological survey of the exposed ground found evidence of extensive habitation.

Juan Ponce de León charted Key Biscayne on his first mission to the New World in 1513. He christened the island Santa Marta and claimed it for the Spanish Crown. He reported that he found a fresh water spring on the island. Ponce de León called the bay behind the island (Biscayne Bay) Chequescha, a variant form of Tequesta.

The next European known to have visited the Key Biscayne area was Pedro Menéndez de Avilés. In 1565 his ship took refuge in Biscayne Bay from a storm. Relations were established with the Tequesta, and in 1567 a mission was established on the mainland across the bay from Key Biscayne. The mission was abandoned three years later in 1570. No other mission was established on the mainland until 1743, and that was withdrawn a few months later.

The first known European settlers on Key Biscayne were Pedro Fornells, his family and household. Fornells and his wife Mariana were Menorcan survivors of the New Smyrna colony in northern Florida. Pedro and Mariana had joined other Menorcans in seeking refuge at St. Augustine after leaving New Smyrna. They stayed in the city after the Spanish regained Florida in 1783. Fornells received a Royal Grant for 175 acres (71 ha) on the southern end of Key Biscayne in 1805. The grant required Fornells to live on the island and establish cultivation within six months. He moved his household to the island, but after six months, the family returned to St. Augustine, leaving a caretaker named Vincent on the island.

=== Territorial years ===
Following the First Seminole War and a treaty with Spain, Florida became a U.S. territory in 1821. Under pressure from US settlers, Seminole and Black Seminoles began to migrate into central and southern Florida. In the early 19th century, African-American slaves and Black Seminoles escaped to the Bahamas from Cape Florida to evade American slaver catchers. In 1820, one traveler reported seeing 60 "Indians", 60 "runaway slaves", and 27 boats of Bahamian wreckers preparing to leave Cape Florida. In a short period before the Cape Florida lighthouse was built in 1825, an estimated 300 Black Seminoles found passage from Key Biscayne to Andros Island in the Bahamas on seagoing canoes and Bahamian boats, settling at Red Bays and Nicholls Town. Although Key Biscayne was less suitable as a departure point after the lighthouse was built, the Bahamas remained a haven for escaping slaves.

In 1824 Mary Ann Channer Davis, who had moved to St. Augustine with her husband in 1821, bought the Fornells claim to Key Biscayne from one of the Fornells' heirs for US$100. Mary and her husband William Davis, a deputy U.S. Marshal, probably were aware of plans to build a lighthouse on the Florida coast somewhere between St. Augustine and Key West, and knew that Key Biscayne was a likely location for it. Mary and William sold three acres (about one-and-a-quarter hectares) of their newly acquired land at the southern tip of the island (Cape Florida) to the U.S. government for US$225. The federal government built the Cape Florida lighthouse on that land in 1825.

The first U.S. citizens to take up permanent residence on Key Biscayne were Captain John Dubose, his wife Margaret and their five children in 1825, when Dubose became the first keeper for the new Cape Florida Light, a post he held until the lighthouse was burned in 1836. The family was also accompanied by two former slaves of Margaret's brother. The Dubose household grew during that time and was reported in 1833 to consist of "eleven whites and several negroes". During his tenure as lighthouse keeper, Dubose received hundreds of plants and seeds from Dr. Henry Perrine, United States Consul in Campeche, Mexico, which he planted on the island. In 1835 a major hurricane struck the island, damaging the lighthouse and the keeper's house, and putting the island under three feet of water, which killed almost all the plants that Dr. Perrine had sent from Mexico.

=== War with the Seminoles ===
In 1836, during the Second Seminole War, Seminoles attacked and burned the Cape Florida lighthouse, severely wounding the assistant lighthouse keeper in charge; his black assistant died of wounds. The lighthouse was not repaired and put back into commission until 1847.

A military post was established on Key Biscayne in March 1838. Its first commander was Lt. Col. James Bankhead. The fort was initially known as Fort Dallas (Note: Fort Dallas was established across Biscayne Bay on the Miami River in 1837.) or Fort Bankhead, but it was eventually renamed Fort Russell for Captain Samuel L. Russell. He was killed when the Seminoles ambushed two boats on the Miami River in February 1839. In the summer of 1839, a total of 143 soldiers and sailors were stationed at Fort Russell. Some of the Seminoles captured during the war were held at Fort Russell until they could be placed on ships to be removed to Indian Territory.

A hospital was established at Fort Russell for United States Army, United States Navy, and United States Marine Corps personnel. In August 1840, the Army surgeon at the hospital treated 103 patients, including 23 for fever and 26 for dysentery. Dysentery was the leading cause of death at the fort, followed by malaria, tuberculosis, gunshot wounds and alcoholism.

Colonel Bankhead was replaced by Lieutenant Colonel William S. Harney in 1839. Colonel Harney had two earlier encounters with Seminoles, the first a battle in which Chief Arpeika eluded capture, and a second in which Harney escaped in only his shirt and drawers from an early morning attack (the Harney Massacre) on his camp led by Chief Chakaika. In light of these experiences, Harney instituted an intensive training program in swamp and jungle warfare for his men. After Chakaika led the raid on Indian Key in August 1840, Harney set out into the Everglades after Chakaika, and killed him in his own camp. The war quieted down after that, with active pursuit of the Seminoles ending in 1842, although some of the Seminoles remained hidden in the Everglades.

While the war against the Seminoles continued, Mary and William Davis made plans to develop a town on Key Biscayne. They had a town plan printed in Philadelphia. The island was touted as an ideal destination "for the recovery of the health". When Indian Key had been named the seat for the newly created Dade County in 1836, the county provided that the county court would meet annually on Key Biscayne. In late 1839 the United States Postmaster General approved a post office for Key Biscayne. The first two lots of the new town were sold to Lt. Col. Harney for a total of US$1,000. There is no evidence that the post office ever opened; in 1842 the Postmaster General noted that the appointed postmaster had not completed any of the requirements for opening the post office. No further sales of town lots were made after Harney's purchase.

A complication arose when Venancio Sanchez of St. Augustine purchased for US$400 a half share in the old Fornells grant from another surviving heir, who lived in Havana. A feud quickly developed between Sanchez and the Davises, with Sanchez demanding a division of the property, and the Davises refusing to acknowledge that Sanchez had any claim to the island. The Davises had hoped that a restored lighthouse would be the centerpiece of their town, but all attempts to repair the lighthouse failed while the war was on. Shortly after the end of the war, the Davises gave up on Key Biscayne and moved to Texas. Their older son Edmund J. Davis eventually was elected as governor there.

=== Surveys and lighthouses ===
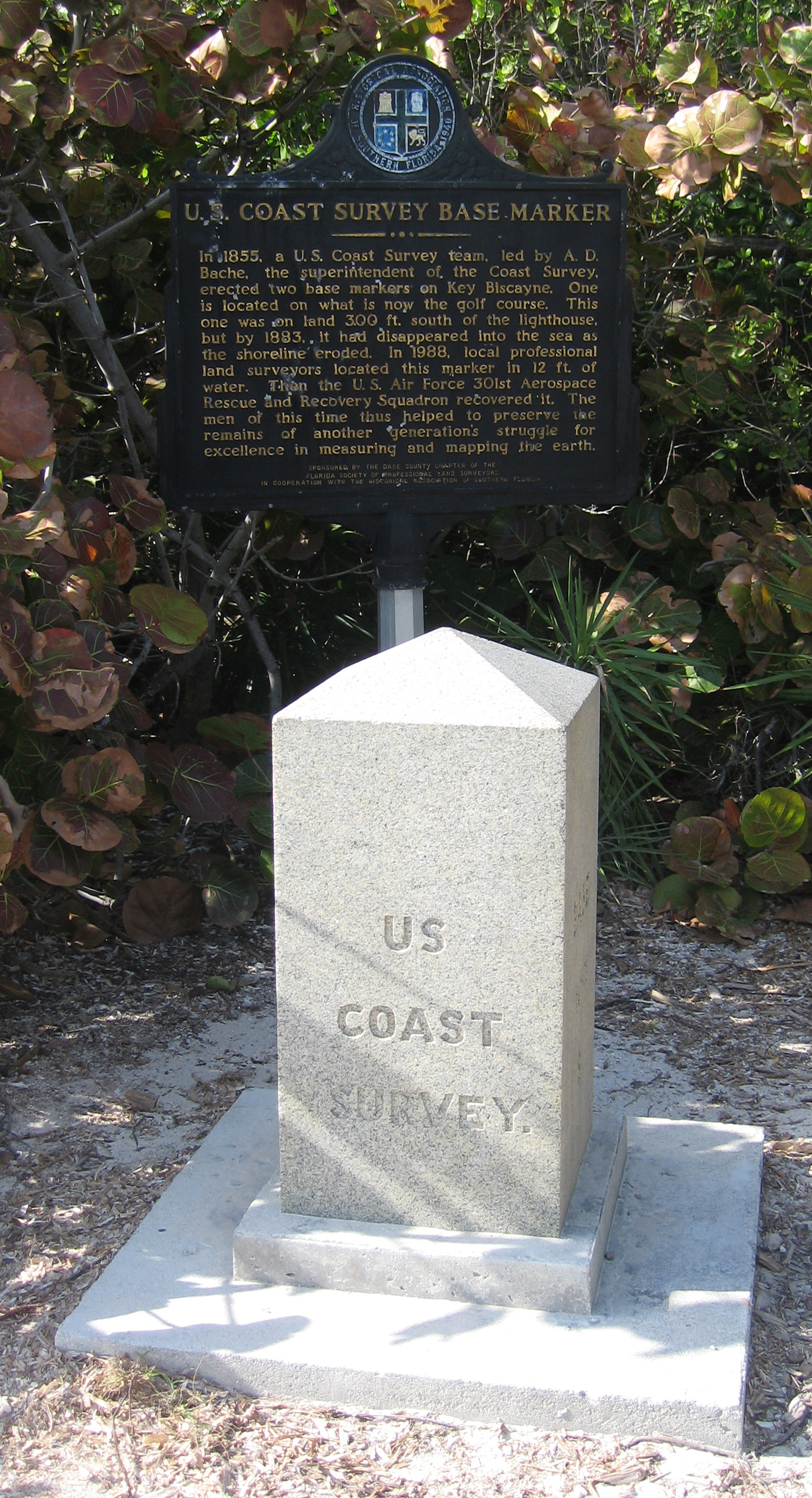
U.S. Coast Survey Base Marker

The numerous ship wrecks that occurred along the southeast coast of Florida from Key Biscayne to the Dry Tortugas was a cause for concern. Between the late 1840s and the late 1850s, more than 500 ships were wrecked on the Florida Reef. The Assistant United States Coast Surveyor reported that in the period from 1845 through 1849, almost one million (United States) dollars' worth of vessels and cargoes were lost on the reef.

In 1846, the U.S. Congress appropriated $23,000 to rebuild the Cape Florida lighthouse and work was completed in 1847.

In 1849 the United States Board of Engineers conducted a preliminary survey of the coast of Florida. In a report written by Lieutenant Colonel Robert E. Lee in March, 1849, the Board recommended that Key Biscayne be made a military reservation. Later that year, the United States Army Corps of Topographical Engineers set up a camp with an astronomical/magnetic station to serve as a datum base for a survey of the Florida Keys and the Great Florida Reef.

To learn more about the Great Florida Reef, Alexander Bache invited Louis Agassiz to study it. The U.S. Coast Survey sent Agassiz to Key Biscayne in 1851. He wrote a detailed report for Bache on the reefs stretching from Key Biscayne to the Marquesas Keys.

The triangulation survey was conducted by the United States Coast Survey with men detailed from the U.S. Army and U.S. Navy. Approximately forty men were based at Cape Florida working on the survey when Alexander Dallas Bache, Superintendent of the U.S. Coast Survey, went to Key Biscayne in 1855 to take charge of it. The survey eventually covered Key Biscayne, Biscayne Bay, the Florida Keys from south of Key Biscayne to the Marquesas Keys, and Florida Bay from the Keys to Cape Sable.

In 1861, Confederate militants sabotaged the lighthouse so that it could not guide Union sailors during the blockade of Confederate Florida. The lighthouse was repaired and re-lit again in 1866. In 1878 the Cape Florida Light was replaced by the Fowey Rocks Light, seven miles (11 km) southeast of Cape Florida.

From 1888 to 1893, the Cape Florida lighthouse was leased by the United States Secretary of the Treasury for a total of US$1.00 (20 cents per annum) to the Biscayne Bay Yacht Club for use as its headquarters. It was listed as the southernmost yacht club in the United States, and the tallest in the world. After the lease expired, the yacht club moved to Coconut Grove, where it continues.

In 1898, in response to the growing tension with Spain over Cuba, which led to the Spanish–American War, the Cape Florida lighthouse was briefly made U.S. Signal Station Number Four. It was one of 36 along the U.S. East Coast and Gulf Coast from Maine to Texas. The Signal Stations were established to provide an early warning of any approach of the Spanish fleet.

The north base marker for Key Biscayne was discovered in 1970 as workers were clearing land. It was at first mistaken as a gravestone for someone named A. D. Bache. The survey base marker at Cape Florida ended up under water, as the south end of the island eroded. It could be seen at low tide as late as 1913. In 1988 the Cape Florida base marker was recovered from under water and installed near the Cape Florida lighthouse.

=== Development ===
Key Biscayne was first developed for coconut cultivation. The earliest mention of coconuts on Key Biscayne is a Spanish account from 1568, although the reference may be to cocoplums rather than coconuts. Mature coconut trees were on Cape Florida by the 1830s, likely grown from coconuts sent from Mexico by Henry Perrine to the first lighthouse keeper, John Dubose.

In the 1880s, Ezra Asher Osborn and Elnathan T. Field of New Jersey started an enterprise to develop the Florida coast from Key Biscayne to Jupiter by clearing native vegetation, leveling Indian midden mounds and beach dunes, and planting coconuts. Osborn and Field imported 300,000 unhusked coconuts from the Caribbean, of which 76,000 were planted on Key Biscayne. Most of the shoots from the coconuts on Key Biscayne were eaten by rats and marsh rabbits (Sylvilagus palustris). As a result of their efforts, in 1885 Osborn and Field were allowed to purchase Key Biscayne and other oceanfront land from the Florida Internal Improvement Trust Fund for 70 cents an acre.

Mary Ann Davis, who had bought the Fornells grant on Key Biscayne in 1821, died in Galveston, Texas in 1885. Her son Waters Smith Davis began taking steps to assert the family title to the island. In 1887 he purchased the rights of the other Davis heirs and received a new deed in his name. He could not get a clear title, however. Venancio Sanchez still claimed a half share of the Fornells Grant, two of the town lots had been sold to William Harney around 1840, and Osborne and Field had their deed from the Florida Internal Improvement Fund. Davis received quitclaims from Osborn and Field, and on the Harney lots, but was unable to settle with Sanchez. He finally received a patent from the United States government for his land in 1898. In 1903 Davis bought the abandoned Cape Florida lighthouse from the United States Treasury for US$400.

Davis started a pineapple plantation on Key Biscayne; six acres (two-and-a-half hectares) had been cleared and planted in pineapples in 1893–94. Davis also directed his caretaker to plant one-half to one acre (two-tenths to four-tenths of a hectare) of bananas. By 1898, a great variety of tropical fruit trees had been planted on the island. Davis also had a large dwelling built for his use. It was a two-story cottage with five bedrooms and verandas on three sides, raised ten feet above the ground on pilings to protect against storm surges.

In the late 1890s, Davis hired Ralph Munroe to oversee his Key Biscayne property. Munroe had begun visiting Biscayne Bay in 1877. He soon built a home, the Barnacle, on land on the mainland in Coconut Grove that he bought from John Frow, keeper of the Cape Florida Light and Fowey Rocks Light. Munroe engaged in wrecking in the waters around Key Biscayne, built sailboats, worked as a pilot for the Cape Florida Channel and opened a pineapple cannery, to which Davis sent his pineapples. Before mail service to the Miami area improved, Munroe would camp out on Key Biscayne every Tuesday evening so that he could sail out to the edge of the Gulf Stream early Wednesday morning to retrieve a package of newspapers and magazines dropped for him in waterproof pouches by a passing steamship. Munroe was also one of the founding members of the Biscayne Bay Yacht Club.

In 1896, Henry Morrison Flagler brought the Florida East Coast Railway to Miami. Mary Ann and William Davis had dreamed of building a city on Key Biscayne. Now their son Waters was a retired millionaire, and interested only in preserving Key Biscayne as a quiet retreat for his family. For a while Flagler's arrival did disturb their quiet, as Flagler brought in dredges to deepen the Cape Florida Channel and the approaches to the mouth of the Miami River, muddying the formerly clear waters of Biscayne Bay. Soon, however, a shorter route from the ocean to Miami was dredged through the southern end of what is now Miami Beach, at Government Cut, and the Cape Florida Channel was allowed to return to a natural state.

=== Coconut plantation and would-be resort ===
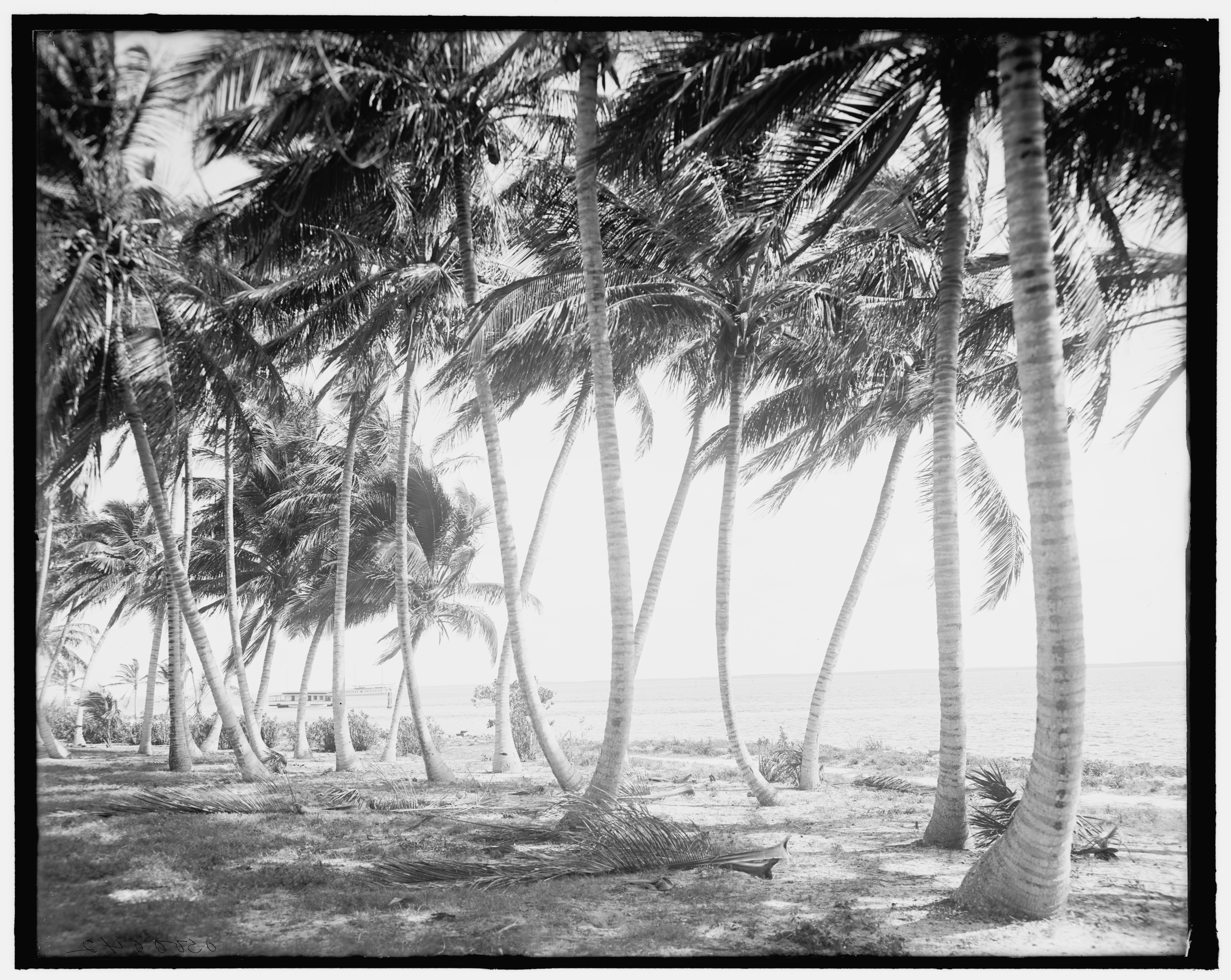
Biscayne Bay visible through coconut trees between 1900 and 1915

In 1902, William John Matheson, who had made his fortune in the aniline dye business, visited Biscayne Bay on his yacht. He soon built a winter home in Coconut Grove overlooking the bay. In 1908 Matheson began buying up the property on Key Biscayne north of the Davis holdings, all the way to Bear Cut, over 1,700 (about 690 hectares) acres. Matheson created a plantation community, employing 42 workers by 1915, and 60 later. It included housing for the workers and their families, packing houses, docks, a school, a big barn, windmills, and 15 miles (24 km) of (unpaved) roads. The plantation had 36,000 coconut trees, and a variety of other tropical fruits. In 1921 Matheson introduced the Malay Dwarf coconut to the United States. This is now the most common variety of coconut found in Florida, after lethal yellowing killed off most of the Jamaican Tall coconut trees and many other varieties. The Matheson coconut plantation was at least twice as large as any other in the United States. By 1933, the world price for coconut products had dropped to about two-fifths of its 1925 level, and the plantation stopped shipping.

Waters Davis decided to sell his Key Biscayne property in 1913 (he died the following year). He appointed Ralph Munroe to act as his broker. Although Matheson bid on the property, Munroe arranged a sale, for US$20,000, to James Deering, the International Harvester heir and owner of the Villa Vizcaya estate in Miami. In 1914 Deering decided to develop his new land on the island as a tropical resort. He felt that Cape Florida's "future lies in making sales for homes." To prepare, the land was cleared, with marshes and mangroves were filled in. Jetties were built on the ocean side, in the belief that they would protect the beaches from erosion. They have been found to aggravate erosion.

Waters Davis stipulated in his sale to Deering that the Cape Florida lighthouse be restored. Deering wrote to the U.S. government seeking specifications and guidelines for the lighthouse. Government officials were taken aback by the request, wondering how a federal lighthouse could have passed into private hands. An Act of Congress and two Executive Orders, in 1847 and 1897, had reserved the island for the federal lighthouse and for military purposes. Patient legal work eventually convinced the U.S. Congress and President Woodrow Wilson to agree to recognize Matheson's and Deering's ownership of Key Biscayne.

In 1920, the heirs of Venancio Sanchez filed a lawsuit against James Deering, claiming an undivided half interest in his Cape Florida property. This brought development of the resort on Cape Florida to a halt. After many legal battles, the suit was finally decided in Deering's favor by the United States Supreme Court in 1926. The decision came too late for Deering; he had died the previous year.

=== 1920s to 1950s ===
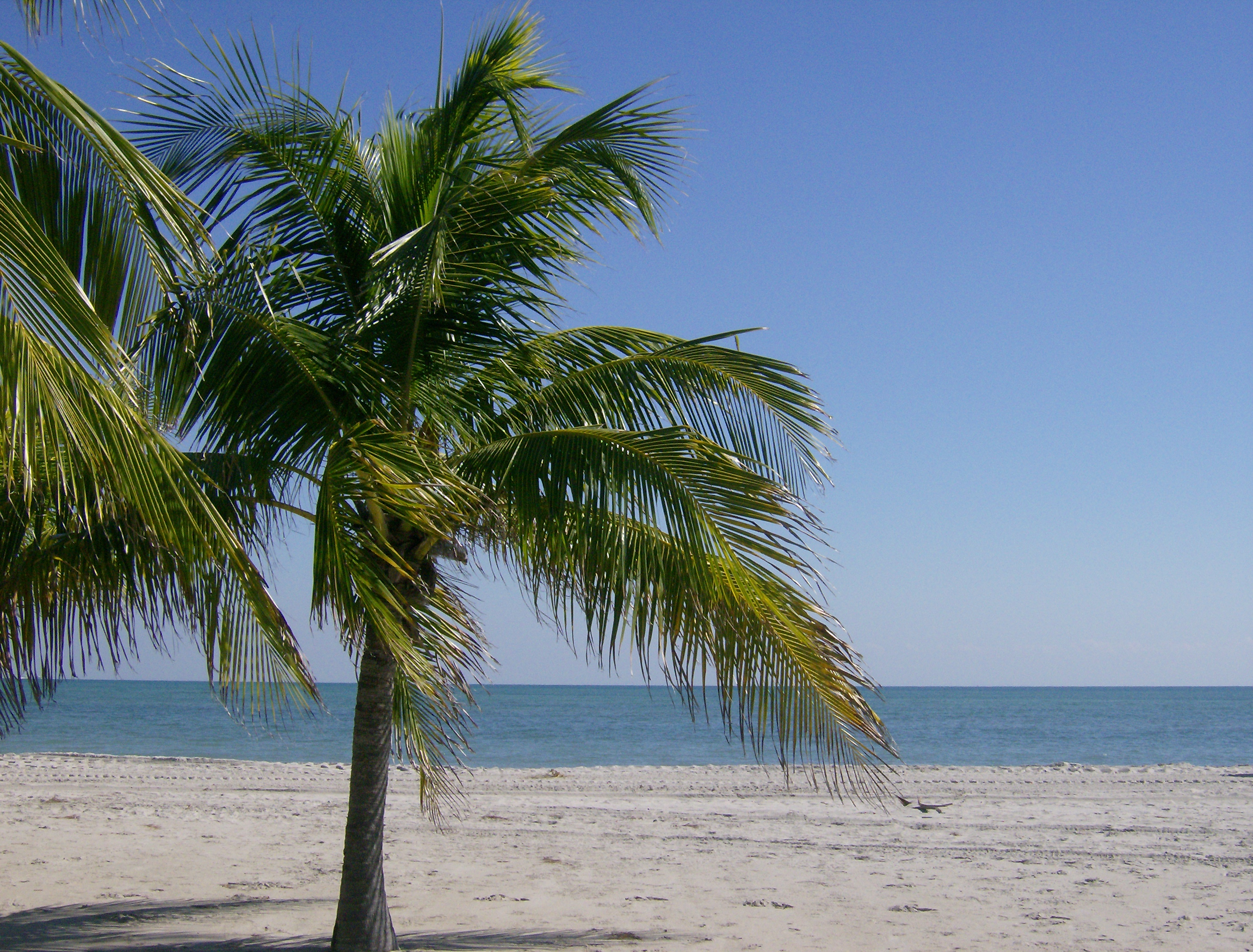
The beach at Crandon Park in Key Biscayne in February 2008

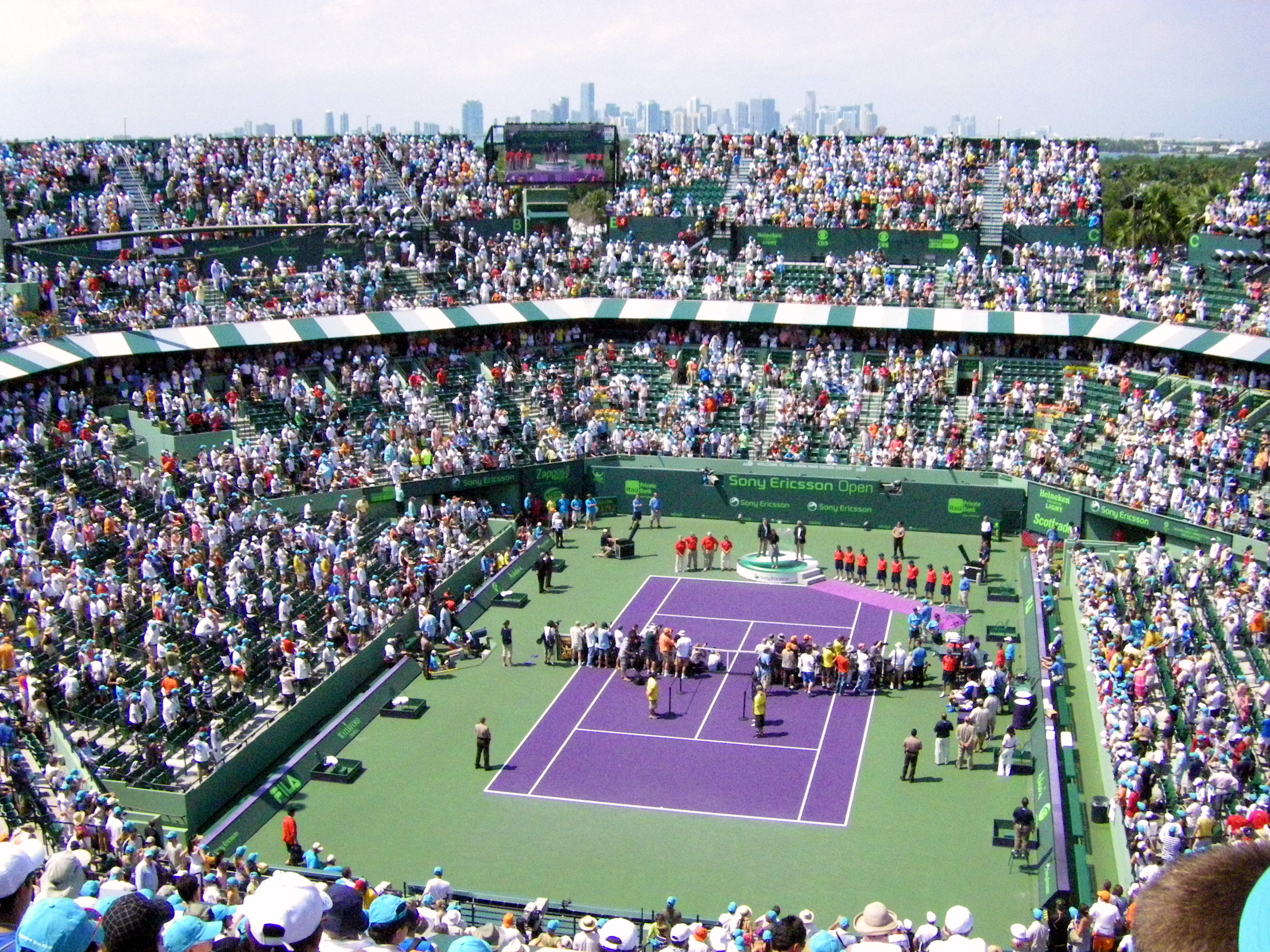
The Miami Open tennis tournament was held at Crandon Park in Key Biscayne from 1987 until 2019 when it moved to Hard Rock Stadium in Miami Gardens.

In February 1926, William Matheson entered into an agreement with D. P. Davis, a land developer unrelated to Waters Davis, to develop and re-sell the northern half of Key Biscayne, including all of what is now Crandon Park and about half the present Village of Key Biscayne. Davis had experience with turning submerged or partially submerged land into prime real estate, having created the Davis Islands in Tampa and Davis Shores near St. Augustine. Later in 1926, the City of Coral Gables incorporated with Key Biscayne, which was included in its boundaries. There were dreams of a bridge to the island, making Key Biscayne the seaside resort for Coral Gables, as Miami Beach had become for Miami.

Obstacles to the project arose. In March 1926, the U.S. government auctioned off some lots on Key Biscayne that had been retained when the rest of the island was transferred to the State of Florida. The Mathesons wanted to have clear title to all of their land, and determined to outbid other interested parties for it. They ended up paying US$58,055 for a total of 6.84 acres (2.77 ha) of land, a record price per acre for the auction of U.S. government land up to that date. On September 18, 1926, the Great Miami Hurricane crossed over Key Biscayne on its way to Miami. Although there were no deaths on the island, most of the buildings were destroyed or badly damaged. Many of the plantings were lost, including half of the coconut trees. The Mathesons rushed to restore their plantation, replanting and buying new equipment to replace what was lost. They soon had 30,000 coconut trees replanted on 900 acres (364 ha). D. P. Davis could not meet his contract; he declared bankruptcy and disappeared en route to Europe by ship.

The Florida land boom was over, and no bridge was built and no development took place on Key Biscayne for the next two decades. William Matheson died in 1930, leaving the island to his children. In 1939, the U.S. Navy approved a proposal to develop Virginia Key as an air base and sea port. There was talk of putting an air base on the north end of Key Biscayne.

In 1940, William Matheson's heirs donated 808.8 acres (327.3 ha) of land, including two miles (3.2 km) of beach on the Atlantic Ocean, on the northern end of Key Biscayne to Dade County to be used as a public park, later named Crandon Park. The county commissioner who negotiated the gift, Charles H. Crandon, had offered to have the county build a causeway to Key Biscayne in exchange for the land donation. As planning for the air and sea complex on Virginia Key was proceeding, construction on a causeway to Virginia Key started in 1941.

The Attack on Pearl Harbor and the entry of the United States into World War II stopped all work on the causeway and the development of Virginia Key. After the war, Crandon pushed on with the development project. He got financier Ed Ball to buy six million (U.S.) dollars' worth of bonds financing construction of the causeway. The causeway was named for Eddie Rickenbacker, a World War I flying ace, and founder and president of the Miami-based Eastern Air Lines.

Starting in 1951, the Mackle Construction Company offered new homes on the island for US$9,540, with just US$500 down. A U.S. Post Office contract branch was opened, the Community Church started holding services, and the Key Biscayne Elementary School opened in 1952.

The residents of Key Biscayne successfully petitioned the Dade County Commission allow a referendum on incorporating the community. The referendum passed and the Village of Key Biscayne was incorporated in 1991, the first new municipality in the county in 30 years.

=== Cape Florida becomes a state park ===
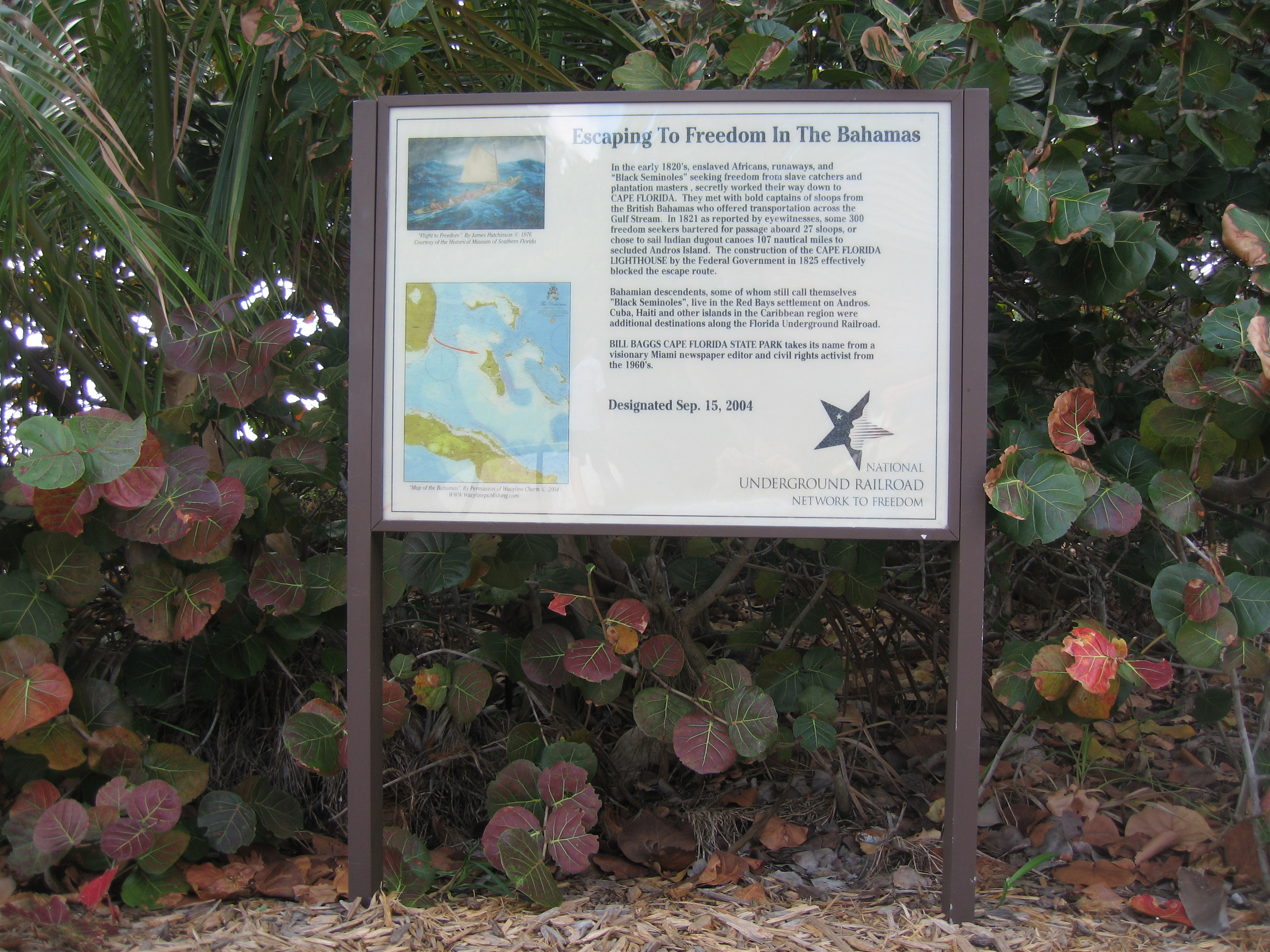
National Network to Freedom Trail sign commemorating hundreds of Black Seminoles who escaped from Cape Florida in the early 1820s to the Bahamas

In 1948, José Manuel Áleman, who had fled Cuba in the wake of scandals surrounding his service as education minister under Ramón Grau San Martín, bought the Cape Florida property from the Deering estate. His offer to donate the lighthouse and ten acres (four hectares) of land around it to the National Park Service was not accepted.

In 1950, the Dade County Planning Board announced a plan to build a highway connecting Key Biscayne with the Overseas Highway on Key Largo. The project envisioned bridges connecting artificial islands, to be built on the Safety Valve and existing small keys to Elliott Key and on to Key Largo. Áleman was expected to donate the right-of-way for a road running down the middle of the island to the first bridge at Cape Florida. With the prospect of a major highway passing through his property, Áleman rushed to prepare it for development: he had it completely cleared, leveled and filled in. A seawall was constructed along the western (Biscayne Bay) side of the Cape Florida property.

Áleman died in 1951, and the County soon backed down from its road and bridge plan. His widow, Elena Santeiro Garcia, added to her Cape Florida property by buying an ocean-to-bay strip that had been part of the Matheson property. It included a canal dug by William Matheson in the 1920s, extending from the bay across most of the island. The land north of the canal was developed as part of the present-day Village of Key Biscayne. Garcia sold the Cape Florida property in 1957 for US$9.5 million, but the buyer defaulted and died the next year. Garcia sold the property again, for US$13 million. Development started on a model community' of luxury homes and resort properties. By 1962 the new developers were in financial trouble, and the property reverted again to Garcia in 1963.

Dade County began considering purchase of 50 acres (200,000 m^{2}) around the Cape Florida lighthouse for a park in 1964. Bill Baggs, editor of The Miami News, campaigned for all the Cape Florida property to be preserved in a park. U.S. Interior Secretary Stewart Udall inspected the property and recommended that it be preserved, although not with Federal funds.

In 1966, Baggs brokered a deal between Elena Santeiro Garcia and the state of Florida, in which Florida bought the property for US$8.5 million, of which US$2.3 million came from the U.S. government. This land was named the Bill Baggs Cape Florida State Park, and opened January 1, 1967. In 2004 a sign was installed to commemorate the site as part of the National Underground Railroad Network to Freedom Trail, for the Black Seminoles who escaped to the Bahamas.

== Works cited ==
- Blank, Joan Gill (1996). Key Biscayne. Pineapple Press. ISBN 978-1-56164-096-6.
- Gaby, Donald C. (1993). The Miami River and its Tributaries. Miami, Florida: Historical Association of South Florida. ISBN 978-0-935761-04-7.
- Leynes, Jennifer Brown; Cullison, David (January 1998). "Biscayne National Park: Historic Resource Study" (PDF). U.S. National Park Service. Archived from the original (PDF) on April 14, 2013.
- Lodge, Thomas E. (2010). The Everglades Handbook: Understanding the Ecosystem (Third ed.). CRC Press. ISBN 978-1-4398-0264-9.
- Sturtevant, William C. (1978). "The Last of the South Florida Aborigines". In Milanich, Jerald T.; Proctor, Samuel (eds.). Tacachale: Essays on the Indians of Florida and Southeastern Georgia During the Historic Period. University Press of Florida. pp. 141–162.
- Voss, Gilbert L.; Voss, Nancy A. (1955). "An Ecological Survey of Soldier Key, Biscayne Bay, Florida". Bulletin of Marine Science. 5 (3): 203–229.
