= William John Matheson =

American industrialist (1856–1930)

William John Matheson (1856–1930) was an American industrialist. Born in Wisconsin, he was educated in Scotland where he learned about recent breakthroughs in the development of aniline dyes. Matheson became an early importer and distributor of such dyes from Germany.

He founded the National Aniline and Chemical Company, which merged with four other companies to become the Allied Chemical and Dye Corporation. Matheson's Fort Hill Estate on Long Island was well known. He also had an estate in Coconut Grove, Florida, and created a coconut plantation on the northern two-thirds of Key Biscayne, an area now occupied by Miami-Dade County's Crandon Park and the Village of Key Biscayne. William's older son, Hugh Merrill Matheson, was an early student at Ransom School and William donated a building to the school; the Matheson Infirmary.

In 1930, William donated 80 acres to the county which became Matheson Hammock Park. In 1940 his children donated 808 acres, the entire north end of Key Biscayne, to the county as Crandon Park and additional acreage on the other side of the bay to Matheson Hammock Park. The Miami Marine Stadium, formally named the Commodore Ralph Middleton Munroe Marine Stadium, was also built on land donated by the Matheson family.
