= Cape Florida Light =

Lighthouse in Florida, US

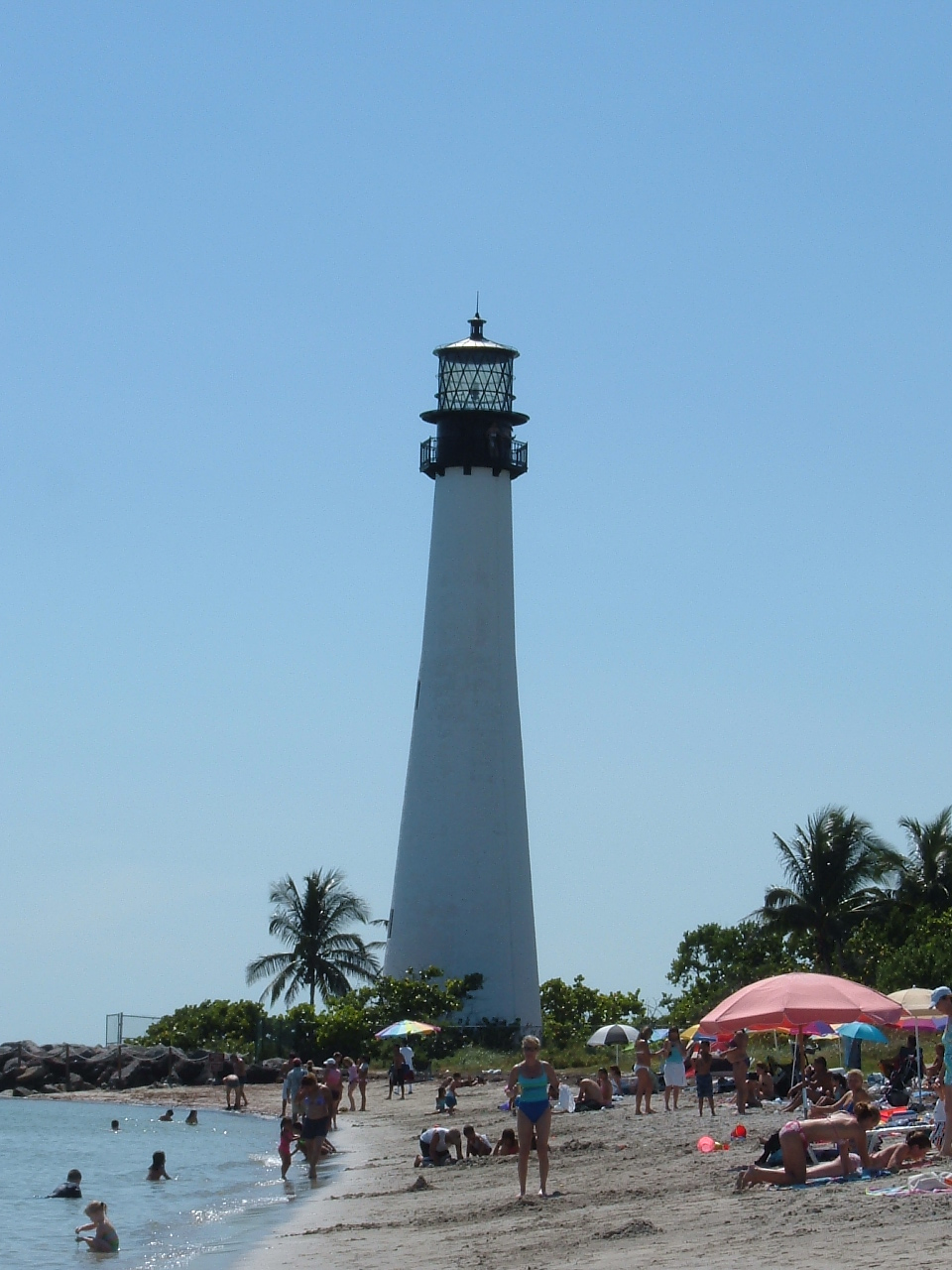
- Location: Cape Florida; Key Biscayne; Florida; United States
- Coordinates: 25°39′59.72″N 80°09′21.47″W

Tower
- Constructed: 1825 (first)
- Foundation: brick on coral reef
- Construction: brick tower
- Automated: 1978
- Height: 95 feet (29 m)
- Shape: tapered cylindrical tower with balcony and lantern
- Markings: white tower, black lantern
- Operator: State of Florida
- Heritage: National Register of Historic Places listed place

Light
- First lit: 1847 (current)
- Deactivated: (1878–1978) and (1990–1996)
- Focal height: 100 feet (30 m)
- Lens: 1846: 17 Argand lamps with 21-in reflectors, 1855: Second-order Fresnel lens, 1996: 300 mm lens
- Characteristic: Fl W 6s.
- Cape Florida Lighthouse
- U.S. National Register of Historic Places
- Location: SE tip of Key Biscayne, inside Bill Baggs Cape Florida State Park, Florida
- Area: 1 acre (0.40 ha)
- Built: 1825
- NRHP reference No.: 70000180
- Added to NRHP: September 29, 1970

The Cape Florida Light is a lighthouse on Cape Florida at the south end of Key Biscayne in Miami-Dade County, Florida. Constructed in 1825, it guided mariners off the Florida Reef, which starts near Key Biscayne and extends southward a few miles offshore of the Florida Keys. It was operated by staff, with interruptions, until 1878, when it was replaced by the Fowey Rocks lighthouse. The lighthouse was put back into use in 1978 by the U.S. Coast Guard to mark the Florida Channel, the deepest natural channel into Biscayne Bay. They decommissioned it in 1990.

Within the Bill Baggs Cape Florida State Park since 1966, the lighthouse was relit in 1996. It is owned and operated by the Florida Department of Environmental Protection.

== History ==
=== Saltwater Railroad ===
Before the Lighthouse was built, the Cape Florida Light was one of the places where slaves and Black Seminoles boarded ships for the Bahamas. This was known as the Saltwater Railroad, a migration that began when Spain transferred its Florida territory to the United States. Under the Spanish, many blacks were free, a right they feared would end under American rule.

Spanish Florida had been a slave refuge until President Andrew Jackson, a strong supporter of slavery, invaded in 1818. When the Americans took over in 1819, the Adam-Onis Treaty prompted hundreds of blacks to begin migrating to the British-held Bahamas. This was the beginning of a decade's long movement. Enslaved people in the south had limited options for escape, northern states and British Canada, where slavery was either abolished or restricted by the 1820s. This made the Bahamas a much more viable option for those in Florida as the nearest island was 154-miles away.

During the early 1820s an estimated 300 Black Seminoles found passage from Key Biscayne to Andros Island in the Bahamas on seagoing canoes and Bahamian boats. In 1820 one traveler reported seeing 60 "Indians", 60 "runaway slaves", and 27 boats of Bahamian wreckers preparing to leave Cape Florida. When construction began in 1825 on the lighthouse the Saltwater Railroad was compromised by the bright light. While the lighthouse was helpful to sailors offshore it proved a setback to those seeking to escape Florida at night. Although Cape Florida was less suitable as a departure point after the lighthouse was built, the Bahamas remained a haven for escaping slaves.

The Park carries a special significance as a designated National Underground Railroad Network to Freedom Site. One of Only two parks in Florida to hold that Distinction. The other is Fort Jefferson in Dry Tortugas.

=== First light ===
The construction contract called for a 65-foot-tall (20 m) tower with walls of solid brick, five feet thick at the bottom tapering to two feet thick at the top. It was later found that the contractor had scrimped on materials and built hollow walls. The first keeper of the lighthouse was Captain John Dubose, who served for more than ten years. In 1835 a major hurricane struck the island, damaging the lighthouse and the keeper's house, and flooding the island under three feet of water.

=== Attack on the lighthouse ===
When the Second Seminole War started in 1835, the Seminoles attacked the few European-American settlers in southern Florida. In January 1836 the Seminoles massacred the family of William Cooley at their coontie plantation on the New River, in what is now Fort Lauderdale.

On hearing of the massacre, the settlers on the mainland around the Miami River crossed over Biscayne Bay to the lighthouse. As the island was not considered safe, the settlers and Captain Dubose's family moved to Key West for refuge.

Later in January, Lt. George M. Bache, U.S. Navy, arrived from Key West with a small work party to fortify the lighthouse tower; they boarded up the ground floor windows and reinforced the door. On July 18, 1836, Captain Dubose went to visit his family in Key West. The assistant keeper, John W. B. Thompson, was in charge, aided by Aaron Carter, an African American.

Five days later, on July 23, 1836, a band of Seminole attacked the lighthouse. Thompson and Carter reached the lighthouse tower; Thompson later recounted feeling rifle balls go through his clothes and hat. The Seminoles grabbed the door just after he turned the key to lock it. Thompson exchanged rifle fire with the Seminoles from upper windows in the tower for the rest of the day but after dark, the raiders approached the tower, setting fire to the door and a boarded-up window at ground level. Rifle balls had penetrated tanks in the bottom of the tower, which held 225 gallons of lamp oil for the light, and the oil caught fire. Thompson's clothing had been soaked with oil, and he and Carter retreated to the top of the tower, taking a keg of gunpowder, balls, and a rifle with them. The two men cut away a part of the wooden stairway below them in the tower before being driven out of the top by the searing flames.

The fire flaming up the interior was so bad that Thompson and Carter had to leave the lantern area at the top and lie down on the 2-foot-wide (0.61 m) tower platform that ran around the outside of the lantern. Thompson's clothes were burning, and both he and Carter had been wounded by the Seminoles' rifle shots. The lighthouse lens and the glass panes of the lantern shattered from the heat. Sure that he was going to die and wanting a quick end, Thompson threw the gunpowder keg down the inside of the tower. The keg exploded but did not topple the tower. It dampened the fire briefly, but the flames soon returned as fierce as ever before dying down. Thompson found that Carter had died from his wounds and the fire.

The next day Thompson saw the Seminoles looting and burning the other buildings at the lighthouse station. They apparently thought that Thompson was dead, as they had stopped firing at him. After the Seminoles left, Thompson was trapped at the top of the tower. He had three rifle balls in each foot, and the stairway in the tower had been burned away. Later that day he saw an approaching ship. The United States Navy schooner Motto had heard the explosion of the gunpowder keg from twelve miles (19 km or 22 km) (Note: It is not clear whether the distance is given in statute miles or nautical miles) away and had come to investigate. The men from the ship were surprised to find Thompson alive. Unable to get him down from the tower, they returned to their ship for the night. The next day the men from the Motto returned, along with men from the schooner Pee Dee. They fired a ramrod tied to a small line up to Thompson and used it to haul up a rope strong enough to lift two men to the top, who could get the wounded man down. Thompson was taken first to Key West, and then to Charleston, South Carolina, to recover from his wounds. The Cape Florida Light was extinguished from 1836 to 1846.

=== Second lighthouse ===
In 1846 a contract was let to rebuild the lighthouse and the keeper's dwelling. The contractor was permitted to reuse the old bricks from the original tower and house. New bricks were also sent from Massachusetts. The contract went to the low bidder at US$7,995. The lighthouse was completed and re-lit in April 1847. It was equipped with 17 Argand lamps, each with 21-inch (530 mm) reflectors. The new keeper was Reason Duke, who had lived with his family on the Miami River before he moved to Key West because of the Second Seminole War. In Key West his daughter Elizabeth had married James Dubose, son of John Dubose, the first keeper.

Temple Pent became the Cape Florida Light keeper in 1852. He was replaced by Robert R. Fletcher in 1854. Charles S. Barron became the keeper in 1855.

=== 1855 renovation ===
In an 1855 renovation, the tower was raised to 95 feet (29 m), to extend the reach of the light beyond the offshore reefs. That year the original lamp and lens system was replaced by a second-order Fresnel lens brought to Cape Florida by Lt. Col. George Meade of the United States Army Corps of Topographical Engineers. The heightened tower with its new, more powerful light, was re-lit in March 1856.

Simeon Frow became the keeper in 1859. Confederate sympathizers destroyed the lighthouse lamp and lens in 1861 during the American Civil War. The light was repaired in 1866, and Temple Pent was re-appointed keeper. He was replaced in 1868 by John Frow, son of Simeon Frow.

=== Decommissioned ===
John Frow continued as keeper of the Cape Florida Light until 1878, when the light was taken out of service. Even with its height and more powerful lamp and lens, the Cape Florida Light was deemed to be insufficient for warning ships away from the offshore reefs. The US Coast Guard decided to build a screw-pile lighthouse on Fowey Rocks, seven miles (11 km) southeast of Cape Florida. When that was completed 1n 1878, the Cape Florida lighthouse was taken out of service. Keeper John Frow and his father Simeon became the first keepers at the new lighthouse at Fowey Rocks.

=== Inactive period ===
From 1888 to 1893, the Cape Florida lighthouse was leased by the United States Secretary of the Treasury for a total of US$1.00 (20 cents per annum) to the Biscayne Bay Yacht Club for use as its headquarters. It was listed as the southernmost yacht club in the United States, and the tallest in the world. After the lease expired, the yacht club moved to Coconut Grove, where it still is active.

In 1898, in response to the growing tension with Spain over Cuba, which resulted in the Spanish–American War, the Cape Florida lighthouse was briefly made U.S. Signal Station Number Four. It was one of 36 along the U.S. East Coast and Gulf Coast from Maine to Texas. The Signal Stations were established to provide an early warning of approach of the Spanish fleet.

The land around the lighthouse at the end of the 19th century belonged to Waters Davis. His parents had purchased the title to a Spanish land grant for the southern part of Key Biscayne soon after the United States acquired Florida from Spain in 1821. They sold the 3 acres (12,000 m^{2}) for the lighthouse site to the U.S. government in 1825. Although there had been competing claims on the land, Davis resolved most of them and in 1898 received a patent from the US government for the land. In 1903 Davis bought the abandoned Cape Florida lighthouse from the United States Treasury for US$400.

In 1913 Davis sold his Key Biscayne property, including the lighthouse, to James Deering, International Harvester heir and owner of Villa Vizcaya in Miami. He stipulated that the Cape Florida lighthouse be restored. When Deering wrote to the U.S. government seeking specifications and guidelines for the lighthouse, government officials were taken aback by the request, wondering how a lighthouse could have passed into private hands. It was soon discovered that an Act of Congress and two Executive Orders, in 1847 and 1897, had reserved the island for the lighthouse and for military purposes. Attorneys eventually convinced the U.S. Congress and President Woodrow Wilson to recognize Deering's ownership of the Cape Florida area of Key Biscayne, including the lighthouse.

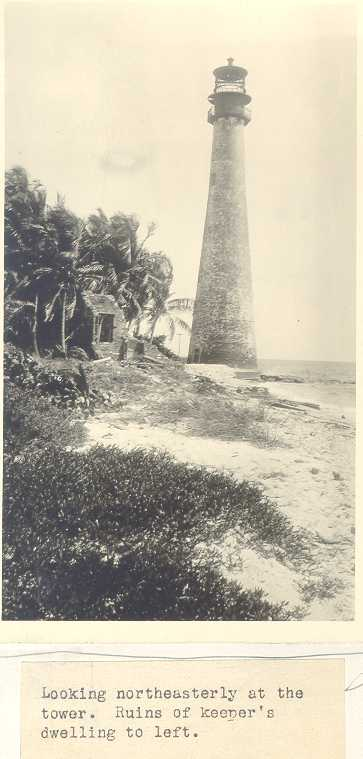
Cape Florida Light in 1923

Beach erosion threatened to undermine the lighthouse, and records show that a quarter mile of beach had washed away in front of it in the 90 years since its construction. Deering had engineers inspect the tower to identify needed restoration work. They discovered that the foundations for the tower were only four feet deep. Deering ordered sandbagging at the base of the tower and the construction of jetties to try to stop the erosion. The engineers first proposed driving pilings under the lighthouse to bedrock to support the tower, but soon discovered that there was no hard bedrock. The engineers built a concrete foundation with steel casing for the tower. Subsequent to the installation of the new foundation, the tower survived the eyewall of the 1926 Miami Hurricane.

=== Restoration ===
The southern third of Key Biscayne, including the lighthouse, was bought by the State of Florida in 1966. It established the land as Bill Baggs Cape Florida State Park, named for the editor of the Miami News, who had urged protection and helped arrange the deal for preservation of the land. The state restored the lighthouse tower, and in 1969 constructed replicas of the keeper's dwellings. The Park Service built replicas of the lighthouse keeper's cottage and kitchen in 1970 to serve as a museum.

In 1978, the Coast Guard restored the lighthouse to active service, one hundred years after it was decommissioned. An automated light was installed in the tower to serve as a navigational aide, particularly to help boaters find the Florida Channel at night. A lighthouse inspection in 1988 found that the foundation installed during Deering's time was in excellent condition. After twelve years of service, the light was decommissioned by the Coast Guard in 1990. The tower survived the close passage of Hurricane Andrew in 1992.

A joint project with the Dade County Historical Society in 1995–1996 restored the lighthouse. A museum was installed in a replica of the keeper's quarters, to give visitors a sense of the maritime history of Florida. As part of the renovation, the light was replaced with its present optics before its reactivation. The lighthouse was relit in time for the Miami Centennial celebration in July 1996. It is now owned and managed by the Florida Department of Environmental Protection.

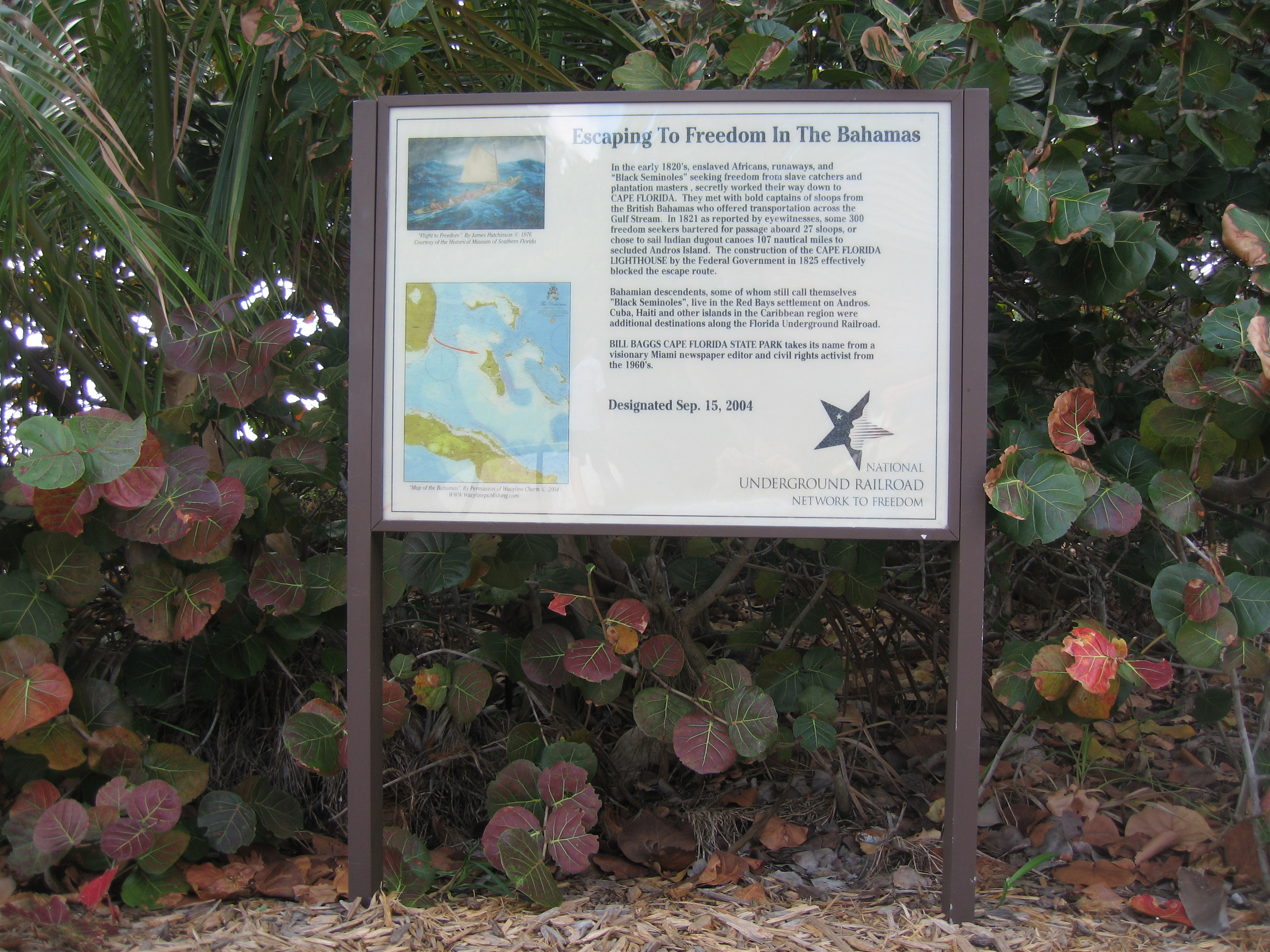
Network to Freedom Trail sign commemorating hundreds of Black Seminoles who escaped from Cape Florida in the early 1820s to the Bahamas.

In 2004 a sign was installed in the park to commemorate the site for the escape of hundreds of slaves and Black Seminoles to the Bahamas in the nineteenth century. It is part of the National Underground Railroad Network to Freedom Trail.

== Depictions in popular media ==
- Popular Science published a picture of the Cape Florida lighthouse in 1930, claiming that the lighthouse was over 200 years old, and still in use. Some bathing beauties were apparently composited into the picture.
- As a Miami landmark, the lighthouse was featured in several episodes of the television series Miami Vice, most extensively during the two-part episode "Mirror Image" (first aired May 6, 1988).
- It was featured briefly at the end of the 1945 John Wayne film They Were Expendable (1945), and as the backdrop of a grisly murder in the Kurt Russell thriller The Mean Season (1985).
- The lighthouse was featured in the third TV season of Burn Notice, in episode 14 entitled, "Partners in Crime" (first aired February 18, 2010).
- The Cape Florida Lighthouse can be seen in the background of the beach scene in season 3, episode 6 of ‘’The Marvelous Mrs. Maisel’’ on Amazon Prime entitled “Kind of Bleu” first aired December 6, 2019.

== See also ==
- List of lighthouses in Florida
- List of lighthouses in the United States
- Bill Baggs Cape Florida State Park
- Key Biscayne

== Sources ==
- Blank, Joan Gill (1996). Key Biscayne. Sarasota, Florida: Pineapple Press. ISBN 1-56164-096-4..
- Florida Department of Environmental Protection (FDEP) (2001-03-15). "Bill Baggs Cape Florida State Park Unit Management Plan".
- "Bill Baggs Cape Florida State Park Approved Unit Management Plan" (PDF). Florida Department of Environmental Protection. October 11, 2012.
- Winsboro, Irvin D. S; Knetsch, Joe (February 2013). "Florida Slaves, the 'Saltwater Railroad' to the Bahamas, and Anglo-American Diplomacy". Journal of Southern History. 79 (1): 51–78. JSTOR 23795403.
