= 1876 Atlantic hurricane season =

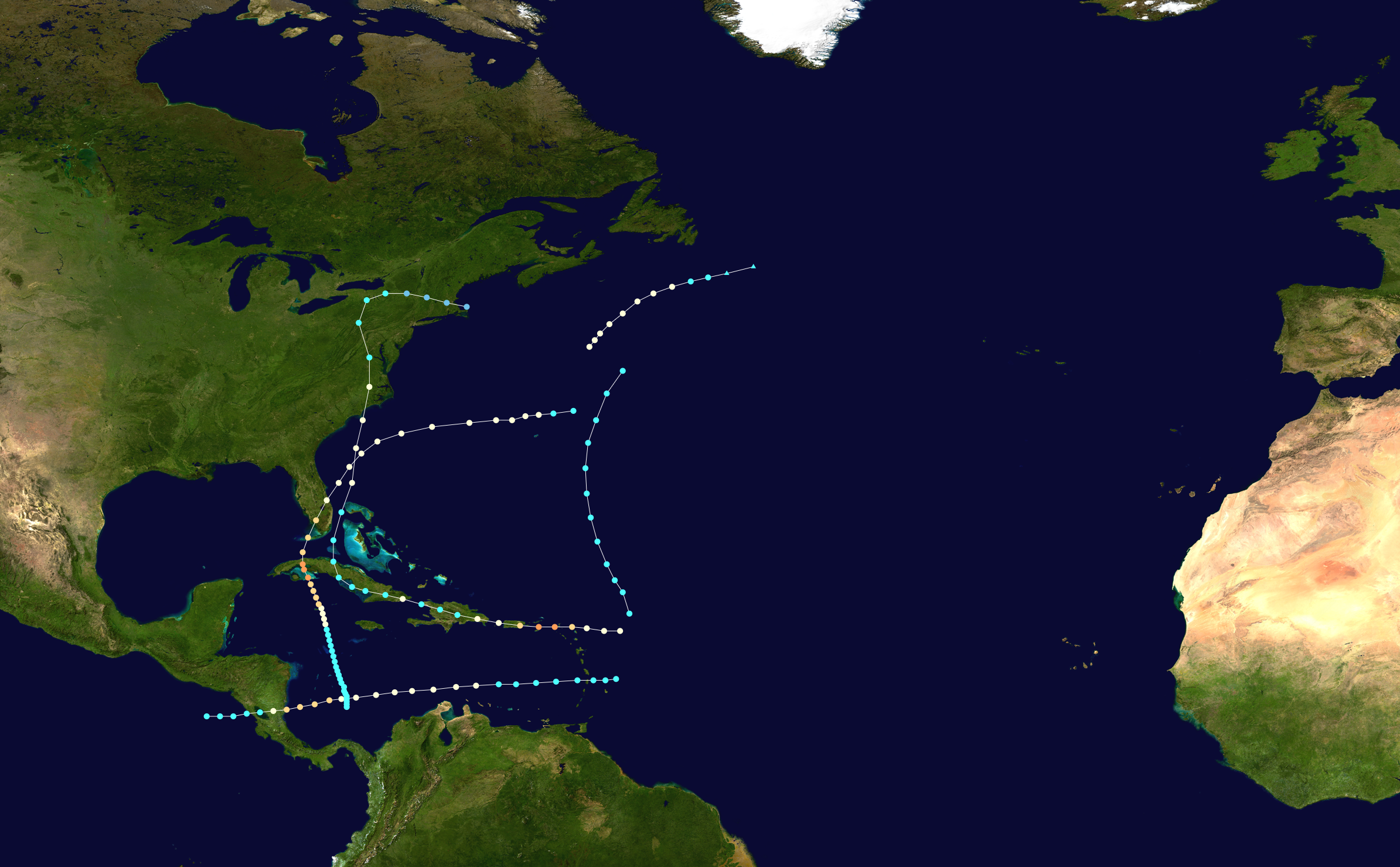
- Season summary map

Seasonal boundaries
- First system formed: Before September 9, 1876
- Last system dissipated: October 23, 1876

Strongest storm
- Name: Five
  - Maximum winds: 115 mph (185 km/h) (1-minute sustained)
  - Lowest pressure: 958 mbar (hPa; 28.29 inHg)

Seasonal statistics
- Total storms: 5
- Hurricanes: 4
- Major hurricanes (Cat. 3+): 2
- Total fatalities: 52
- Total damage: $5.03 million (1876 USD)

The 1876 Atlantic hurricane season featured the first hurricane landfall in North Carolina since 1861. Overall, the season was relatively quiet, with five tropical storms developing. Four of these became a hurricane, of which two intensified into major hurricanes. (Note: A major hurricane is a storm that ranks as Category 3 or higher on the Saffir–Simpson hurricane wind scale.) However, due to the absence of remote-sensing satellite and other technology, only storms that affected populated land areas or encountered ships at sea were recorded; therefore, the actual total could be higher. An undercount bias of zero to six tropical cyclones per year between 1851 and 1885 and zero to four per year between 1886 and 1910 has been estimated.

Of the known 1876 cyclones, both the first and fourth systems were first documented in 1995 by José Fernández-Partagás and Henry Diaz. They also proposed large changes to the known tracks of the second and fifth storms. The track and start position of the fifth system was further amended in 2003 by the Atlantic hurricane reanalysis project, which did not add any storms to the official hurricane database (HURDAT). However, climate researcher Michael Chenoweth authored a reanalysis study, published in 2014, which concluded that the 1876 season featured a total of 12 tropical cyclones. This included the removal of the third system due to a lack of information and the addition of eight previously undocumented storms. Chenoweth also proposed some alterations to the track and intensity of each storm, including a significant extension of the track and duration of the first cyclone. However, these changes have yet to be incorporated into HURDAT.

The season's first known cyclone was first observed between Bermuda and Nova Scotia on September 9. It transitioned into an extratropical cyclone two days later. On September 12, the track of the next storm begins as a hurricane just east of the Leeward Islands. The system crossed the Lesser and Greater Antilles, causing particularly severe impacts on Puerto Rico, including at least 19 deaths. After striking North Carolina on September 17, the storm killed people in the state, all due to drowning. The hurricane and its remnants then impacted the Northeastern United States, with $30,000 (1876 USD) in damage on the barrier islands of Cape May County, New Jersey, alone. (Note: All damage figures are in 1876 USD, unless otherwise noted) In early October, the fourth storm struck Nicaragua, rendering about $5 million in damage and leaving approximately 20 deaths. Later that month, the fifth and final known storm caused damage in the Cayman Islands, Cuba, and Florida prior to being last noted just northeast of Bermuda on October 23. Overall, the cyclones of the 1876 season left 52 fatalities and more than $5.03 million in damage.

== Season summary ==
The Atlantic hurricane database (HURDAT) officially recognizes five tropical cyclones for the 1876 season. Four storms attained hurricane status, with winds of 75 mph (120 km/h) or greater. The second and fourth hurricanes both peaked with maximum sustained winds up to 115 mph (185 km/h). Thus, both of these storms intensified into a major hurricane. In 1995, reanalysis by José Fernández-Partagás and Henry Diaz led to the addition of the first and fourth systems in HURDAT. While the Atlantic hurricane reanalysis project did not add any new cyclones during their reanalysis in 2003, climate researcher Michael Chenoweth concluded that the 1876 season had a total of 12 storms in a reanalysis study published in 2014. This included the removal of the third system and the addition of eight previously undocumented cyclones. However, Chenoweth's proposals have yet to be incorporated into HURDAT.

The first storm of the season, initially observed by three ships on September 9, was a hurricane that existed for two days offshore Atlantic Canada. Three other cyclones developed in September. The season's second storm, also known as the San Felipe hurricane, was first observed near the Windward Islands on September 12 and struck Puerto Rico as a Category 3 hurricane before crossing Hispaniola and Cuba. It then turned north-northeastward and made landfall in North Carolina, becoming the first to strike the coast of that state since 1861. (Note: The "Chronological List of All Hurricanes: 1851 – 2022" lists a storm in September 1874 as impacting North Carolina at Category 1 intensity. However, that storm actually made landfall in South Carolina and then crossed into North Carolina as a hurricane.) The cyclone continued through the interior of the United States until dissipating near Cape Cod on September 19. Officially, this storm caused 52 deaths and more than $30,000 in damage, as the latter only includes Cape May County, New Jersey. The season's fourth cyclone and third to form in the month of September struck Nicaragua in early October, leaving about $5 million in damage and about 20 deaths. Later, the fifth and final known storm impacted the Cayman Islands, Cuba, and Florida before being last detected to the northeast of Bermuda on October 23. Overall, the cyclones of the 1876 season are known to have collectively caused at least 52 deaths and more than $5.03 million in damage.

The season's activity was reflected with an accumulated cyclone energy (ACE) rating of 57, the second lowest total of the 1870s decade. ACE is a metric used to express the energy used by a tropical cyclone during its lifetime. Therefore, a storm with a longer duration will have higher values of ACE. It is only calculated at six-hour increments in which specific tropical and subtropical systems are either at or above sustained wind speeds of 39 mph (63 km/h), which is the threshold for tropical storm intensity. Thus, tropical depressions are not included here.

== Systems ==
=== Hurricane One ===
- Category 1 hurricane (SSHWS)
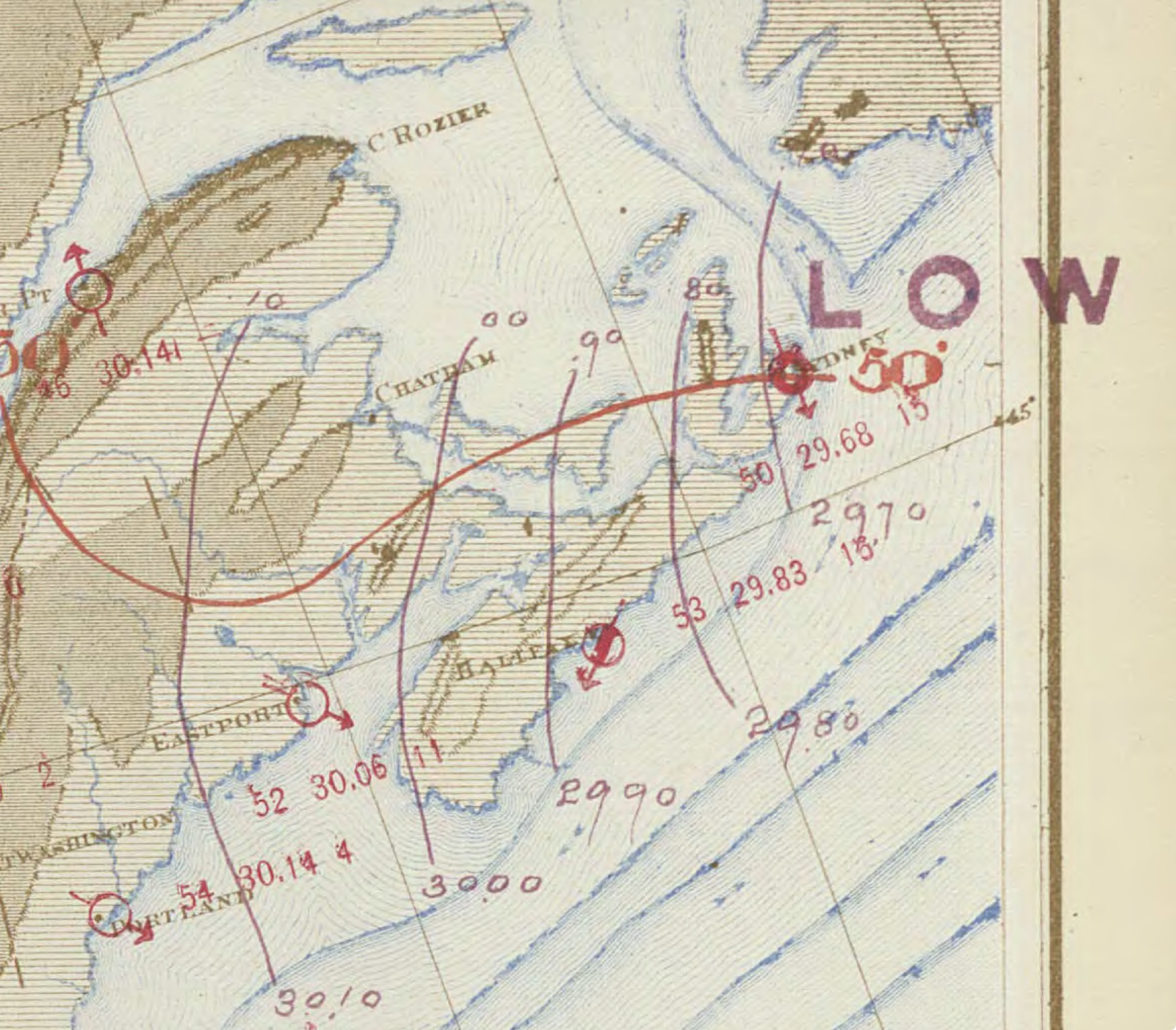
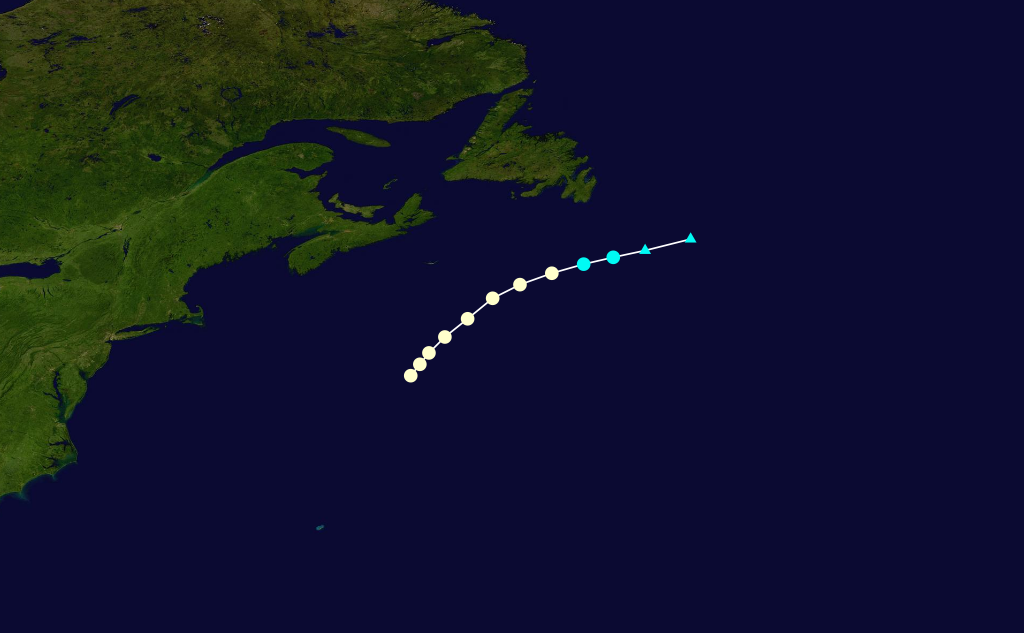
- Duration: September 9 – September 11
- Peak intensity: 90 mph (150 km/h) (1-min); 970 mbar (hPa)

On September 9, the ships Annie and Lilly, Alfred, and Astor each encountered this storm south of Atlantic Canada. Because the Alfred observed a barometric pressure of 970 mbar (29 inHg), HURDAT begins the track of this cyclone as a hurricane with winds of 90 mph (150 km/h) about halfway between Bermuda and Nova Scotia. The hurricane did not strengthen and began to gradually weaken as it moved to the south of Newfoundland. It weakened to a tropical storm early on September 11 and transitioned into an extratropical cyclone several hours later.

Climate researcher Michael Chenoweth theorized that this storm began as a tropical depression near the Cabo Verde Islands on September 2. Chenoweth's study, published in 2014, notes that the cyclone intensified into a tropical storm by the following day and moved generally northwestward until September 7. Additionally, Chenoweth concluded that it did not attain hurricane status.

=== Hurricane Two ===
- Category 3 hurricane (SSHWS)
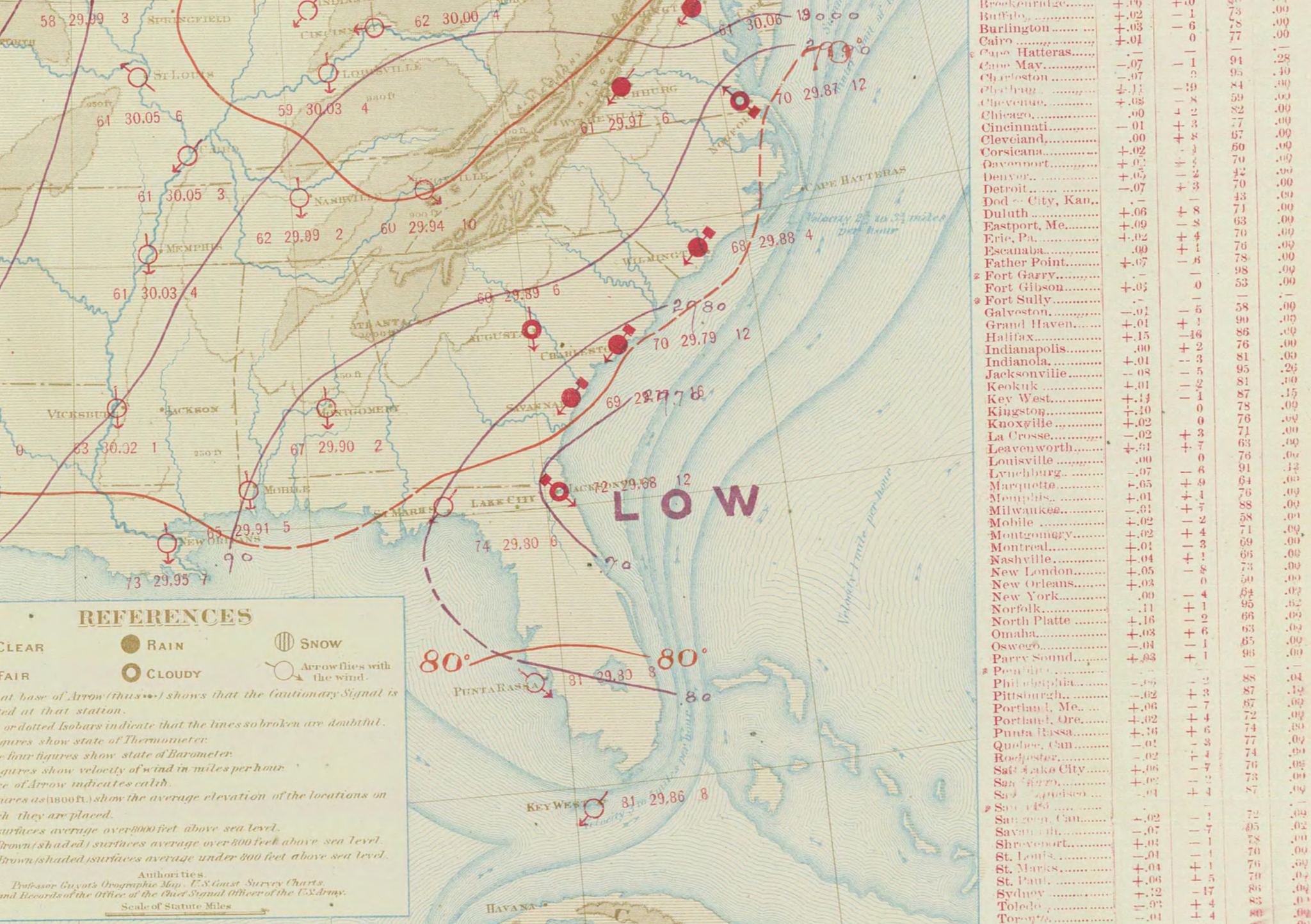
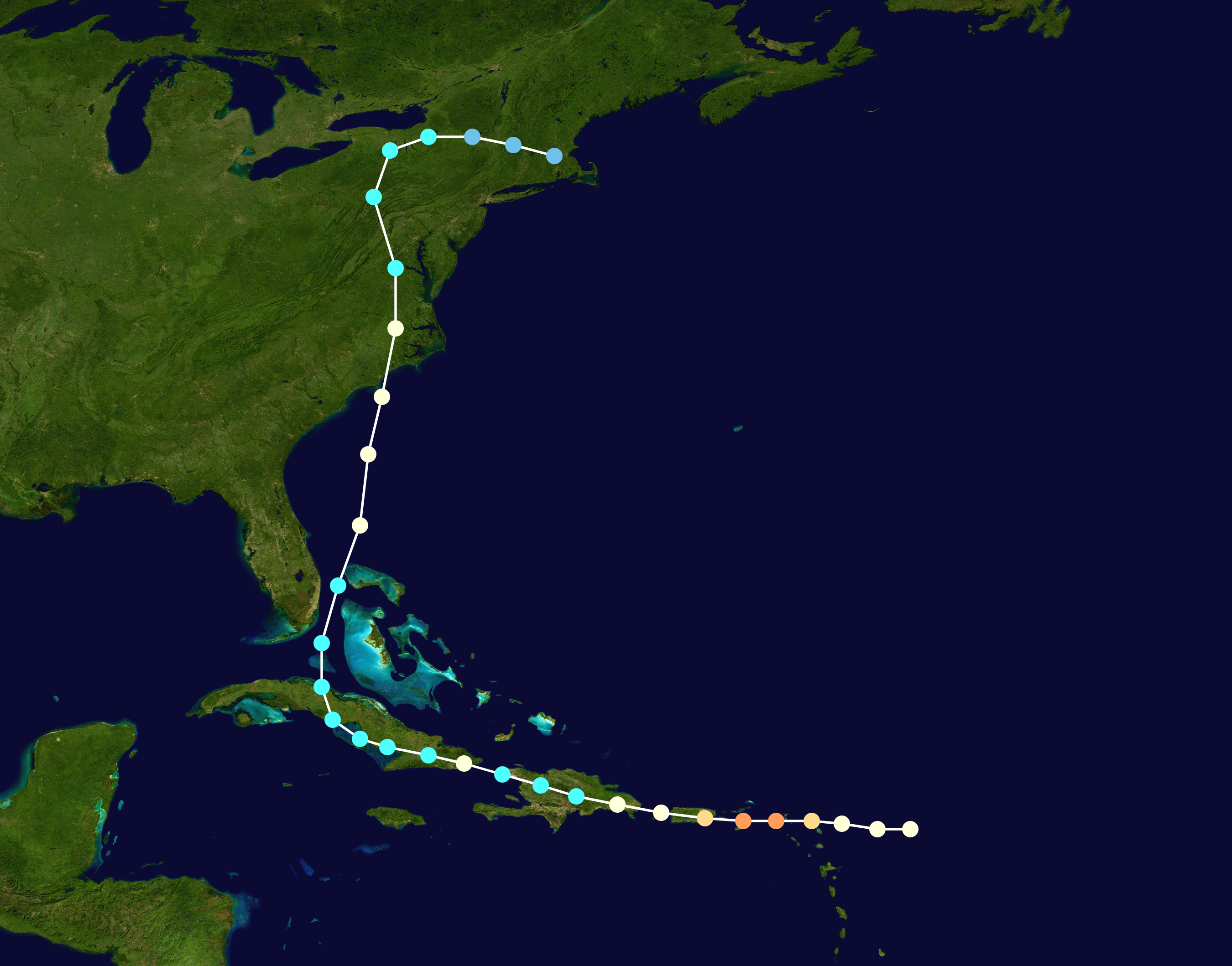
- Duration: September 12 – September 19
- Peak intensity: 115 mph (185 km/h) (1-min); 980 mbar (hPa)

Hurricane San Felipe of 1876

While the bark Mary M. Williams reportedly encountered this storm before September 12, the official track for this system begins on that day due to the system's close proximity to the Lesser Antilles, which allowed more observations to confirm its existence. Considered a hurricane at the beginning of its track, the storm moved generally westward and passed either or over Anguilla, Saint Barthélemy, and Saint Martin late on September 12. By early the next day, the cyclone briefly intensified into a Category 3 hurricane, peaking with winds of 115 mph (185 km/h), several hours before striking Puerto Rico between Yabucoa and Humacao. The system moved west-northwestward across the Mona Passage and struck the Dominican Republic, weakening to a tropical storm on September 14 as it traversed Hispaniola. Thereafter, the storm briefly re-attained hurricane status while crossing the Windward Passage early on the next day and soon made landfall in Cuba near San Antonio del Sur. Weakening to a tropical storm, the cyclone continued west-northwestward until turning northward over the central part of the island, barely avoiding Florida on September 16. The storm became a hurricane again early on September 17, several hours before striking near Wilmington, North Carolina. The storm moved parabolically across the interior of the United States, dissipating on September 19 near Cape Cod, Massachusetts.

A newspaper on Saint Thomas noted that many homes lost their roofs and fences, but that impact from this storm was less than during other storms. Saint Croix, however, reportedly experienced its worst hurricane in 50 years, while Saint Kitts also suffered considerably. In Puerto Rico, the storm was remembered as the "San Felipe Hurricane" because it struck on September 13, the feast day of Saint Philip. Exactly 52 years later, Puerto Rico was struck by Hurricane San Felipe Segundo, a much more destructive and powerful cyclone. The lowest pressure during the 1876 storm was 989 mb (29.20 inHg) at San Juan, where the storm left few homes undamaged. Overflowing rivers and the storm itself carried away many bridges and caused significant losses to coffee, rice, and sugarcane estates. A total of 19 deaths were reported, but historians suspected the Spanish government withheld the actual damage and death toll data for Puerto Rico. At least 13 drownings occurred in North Carolina, two in Onslow County and eleven others after the Rebecca Clyde sank at Portsmouth. Many other ships capsized along the coast of North Carolina. Flooding, damage to buildings, and uprooted trees were reported in Wilmington. The cyclone impacted several other states, particularly New Jersey, with The New York Times declaring it "one of the most severe ever known along the coast of New Jersey." Damage on the barrier islands of Cape May County reached $30,000.

Chenoweth extended the track of this system back two days, with a tropical storm east of the Lesser Antilles, and proposed that the cyclone did not weaken to a tropical storm despite its passage over Puerto Rico, Hispaniola, and Cuba.

=== Tropical Storm Three ===
- Tropical storm (SSHWS)
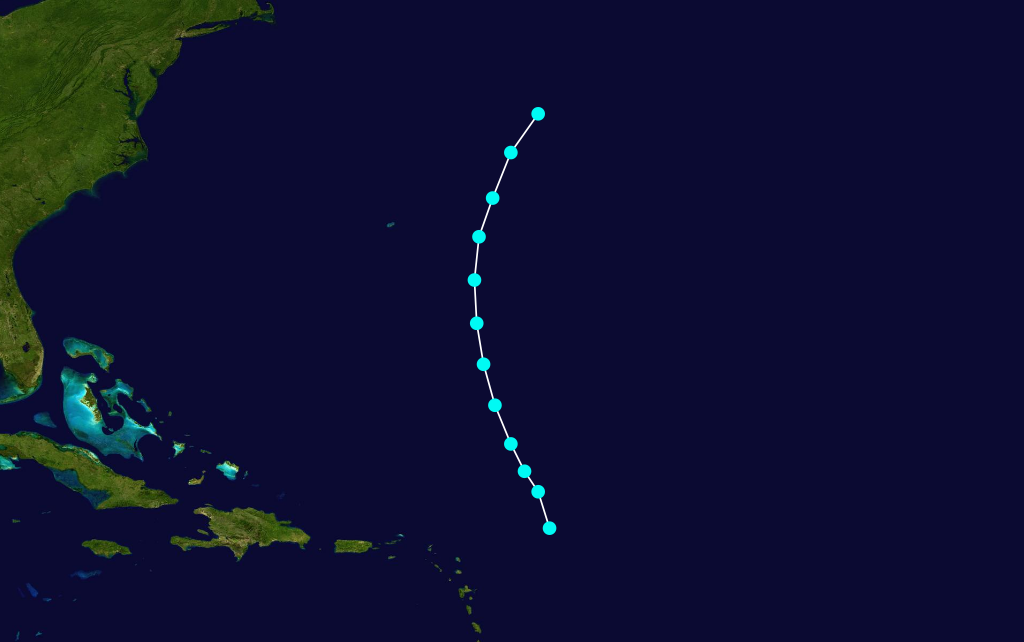
- Duration: September 16 – September 18
- Peak intensity: 60 mph (95 km/h) (1-min);

The track of the season's third cyclone begins about 270 mi (435 km) east-northeast of the Lesser Antilles. It headed north, peaking with winds of 60 mph (95 km/h) and passing well to the east of Bermuda. The system apparently dissipated on September 18. Chenoweth could not confirm the existence of this storm, noting "Insufficient supporting evidence from other neighboring data sources".

=== Hurricane Four ===
- Category 2 hurricane (SSHWS)
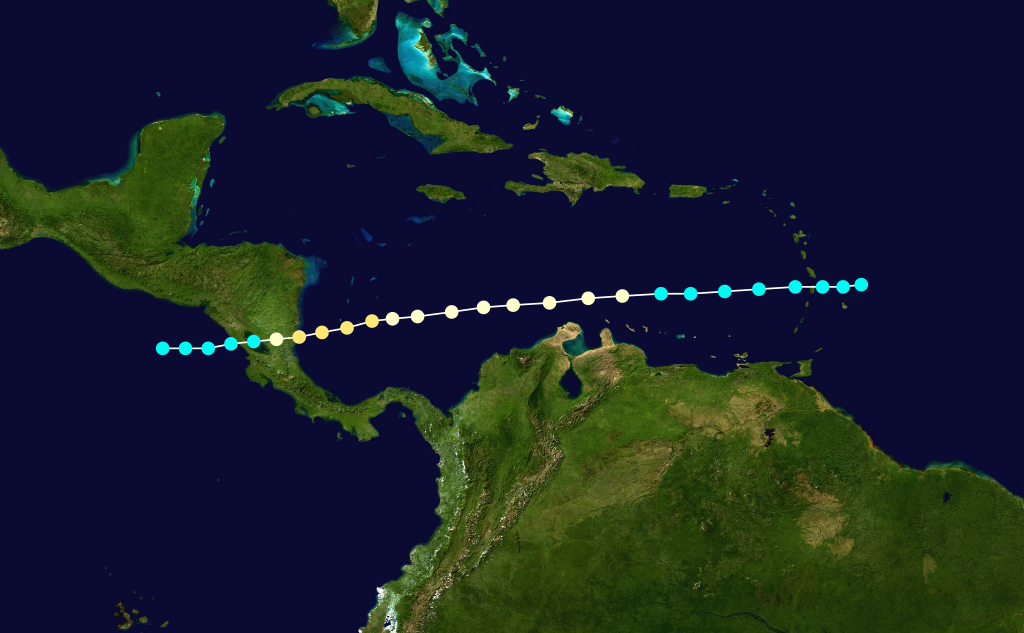
- Duration: September 29 – October 5
- Peak intensity: 105 mph (165 km/h) (1-min);

The RMS Nile first observed a tropical storm east of Martinique on September 29. By early on October 1, the storm strengthened into a hurricane as it passed near the Netherlands Antilles. It later peaked as a Category 2 hurricane before making landfall just south of Bluefields, Nicaragua, late on October 3. The system weakened to a tropical storm early on the next day, but remained a tropical cyclone due to crossing relatively flat terrain. Several hours later, the storm reached the Pacific Ocean, but dissipated on October 5.

The cyclone severely damaged parts of Central America, inundating the Nicaraguan capital of Managua with floodwaters. People climbed rooftops to evade the floodwaters. On the east coast of the country, 300 homes were destroyed at Bluefields. The hurricane also demolished some 500 homes in Managua. Overall, the cyclone left approximately $2 million in damage to property and $3 million to coffee crops. About 20 deaths occurred. The ship Costa Rica, in the eastern Pacific and bound for Acapulco on October 4, lost her hurricane-deck as well as the head of her main mast, main topmast, and gaff. She also lost one of her quarter boats and experienced a wind shift at 2030 UTC.

The 2014 study by Chenoweth proposed a much slower-moving system, which began near Tobago on September 24. Initially moving west-northwestward, the storm begins a west-southwestward trajectory two days later. Additionally, the cyclone attains a much stronger intensity, peaking with winds of 150 mph (240 km/h), equivalent to Category 4 status.

=== Hurricane Five ===
- Category 3 hurricane (SSHWS)
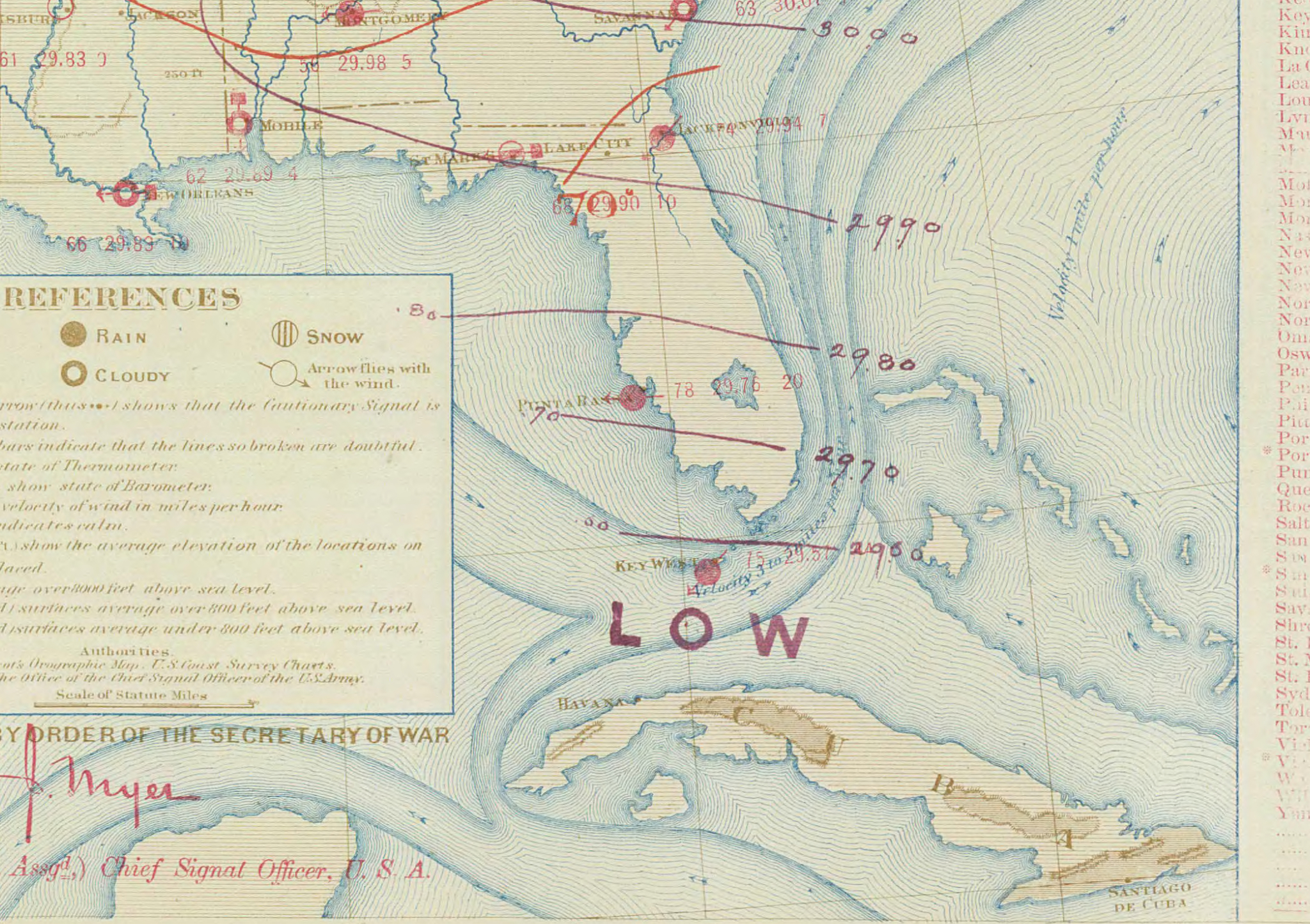
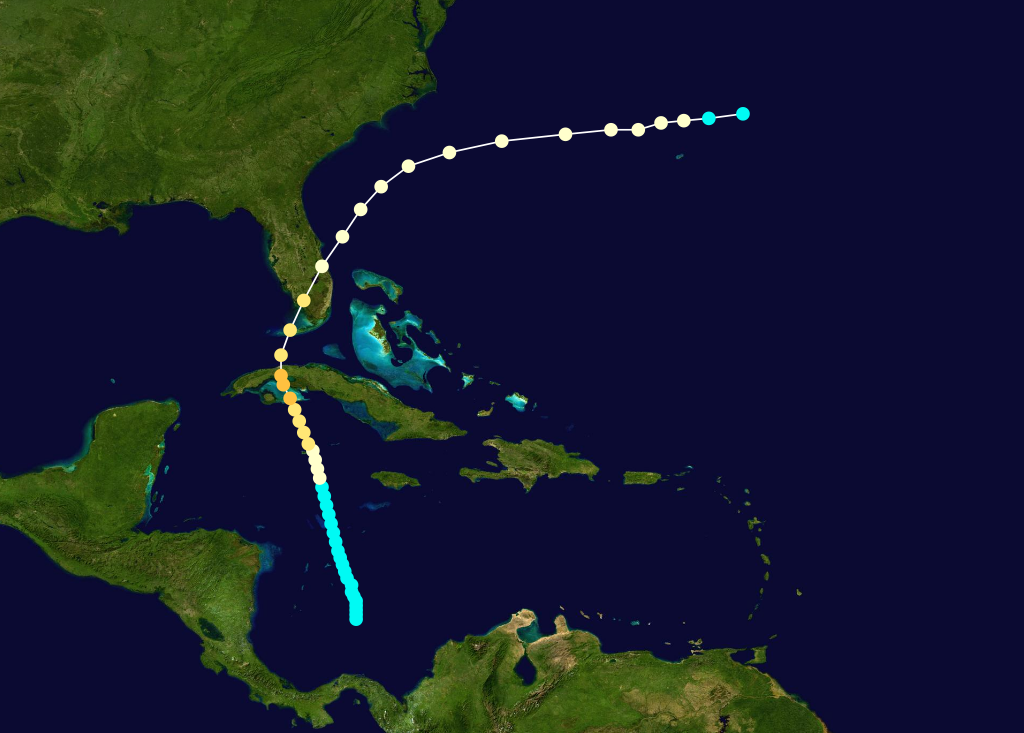
- Duration: October 12 – October 23
- Peak intensity: 115 mph (185 km/h) (1-min); 958 mbar (hPa)

The Cuba-South Florida Hurricane of 1876

A tropical storm was discovered north of Panama on October 12. The storm moved very slowly and generally northward. It became a hurricane early on October 17 and passed just east of Grand Cayman. It attained a peak intensity of 115 mph (185 km/h) just before making landfall on Bejucal in western Cuba, where the barometer dropped as low as 958 mbar (28.3 inHg) on October 19. The calm center of the storm passed over the capital Havana and then turned northeastward as it entered the Straits of Florida. Just before 00:00 UTC on October 20, the eye of the cyclone struck Key West, Florida. About six hours later, early on October 20, the hurricane made landfall on the mainland near Chokoloskee with winds of 105 mph (165 km/h) and emerged into the Atlantic near Sebastian around 12:00 UTC. In passing over Eau Gallie near Melbourne, the calm eye lasted about four hours between 08:30–12:30 UTC. The cyclone later passed north of Bermuda before dissipating on October 23.

On Grand Cayman, where west winds occurred during the closest approach of the cyclone, severe damage and the destruction of 170 houses was reported. The storm disrupted communications via telegram across the island of Cuba, although the most significant damage occurred in Havana and Matanzas provinces. The city of Havana reported significant damage to several buildings. In South Florida, the hurricane produced tides of 8 to 10 ft (2.4 to 3.0 m) on Biscayne Bay, but local ships rode out the storm in a natural anchorage called Hurricane Harbor, on the west side of Key Biscayne. The bark Three Sisters was wrecked on Virginia Key, her cargo of lumber being salvaged by local residents. The storm flooded the islands on Biscayne Bay and destroyed many structures. On the Lake Worth Lagoon, the cyclone snapped or blew down large mastic and banyan trees, each more than 3 ft (0.9 m) in diameter and believed to have been hundreds of years old. All vegetation was stripped of foliage and branches were downed, while settlers' furniture was blown away. After the storm, the Atlantic Ocean appeared yellowish-brown due to silt, and numerous fish and sea mammals, including porpoises, were found beached. The settlement that later became Palm Beach was destroyed. Two decades later in 1896, the storm was still noted by settlers as among the worst ever in South Florida. Bermuda recorded gale-force winds and a pressure of 29.30 inHg (992 mb).

Chenoweth began the track for this system farther south and two days earlier, October 10. The storm intensified into a hurricane on October 12, several days before HURDAT indicates. Additionally, the study proposed that the cyclone weakened to a tropical storm slightly earlier on October 23 and transitioned into an extratropical cyclone that day.

=== Other storms ===
A reanalysis study proposed eight additional tropical cyclones during the 1876 season, including five before the first system currently listed in HURDAT. Chenoweth's first unofficial storm begins over the eastern Caribbean Sea on July 17. Moving west-northwestward, the system remained just south of the Greater Antilles as it intensified into a hurricane. Two landfalls at hurricane intensity occurred in Mexico – first on the Yucatán Peninsula and then in the state of Veracruz – before the storm dissipated near Mexico City on July 23. About a week later, on July 30, a tropical depression formed approximately halfway between Bermuda and South Carolina. Trekking to the northwest, the cyclone approached North Carolina on August 1 but then turned northeastward. Chenoweth theorized that the storm briefly attained hurricane status on the following day before weakening to a tropical depression and dissipating roughly halfway between Bermuda and Nova Scotia. The next unofficial system began about halfway between Bermuda and Puerto Rico on August 13. Moving generally north-northwestward, the depression dissipated just west of Bermuda three days later. Chenoweth concluded that the cyclone briefly attained hurricane status on August 14. A third unofficial system formed on August 17 near Barbados. The storm moved generally northwestward and passed near Martinique on the following day. It later crossed Hispaniola and Cuba before becoming extratropical over the Straits of Florida on August 25. That same day, another storm formed about halfway between Bermuda and Puerto Rico. Moving mostly north-northeastward throughout its duration, the storm held hurricane status from August 26 to August 29 and was last noted east of Newfoundland on August 30.

Chenoweth proposed that another storm developed roughly halfway between the Capo Verde Islands and the Leeward Islands on September 12. The cyclone initially moved north-northwestward to northwestward before turning to the northeast three days later. On September 18, the system became extratropical just north of the Azores. Chenoweth initiated the track of another storm just east of the Windward Islands on September 29. Moving north-northwestward, the cyclone passed just west of Barbados that day and briefly attained hurricane status. The storm then turned westward and struck Martinique early on September 30 before curving southwest over the Caribbean. On October 1, the system weakened to a tropical depression and dissipated near La Orchila Island. The track of the final unofficial begins as a hurricane over the central Atlantic on November 7. After initially trekking to the northwest, the storm turned northeastward by the next day. The hurricane weakened to a tropical storm early on November 10 and was last noted southwest of the Azores on November 12.

== Season effects ==
This is a table of all of the known storms that formed in the 1876 Atlantic hurricane season. It includes their known duration (within the basin), areas affected, damages, and death totals. Deaths in parentheses are additional and indirect (an example of an indirect death would be a traffic accident), but were still related to that storm. Damage and deaths include totals while the storm was extratropical, a wave, or a low, and all of the damage figures are in 1876 USD.

Saffir–Simpson scale
| TD | TS | C1 | C2 | C3 | C4 | C5 |

1876 North Atlantic tropical cyclone season statistics
| Storm name | Dates active | Storm category at peak intensity | Max 1-min wind mph (km/h) | Min. press. (mbar) | Areas affected | Damage (US$) | Deaths | Ref(s). |
|---|---|---|---|---|---|---|---|---|
| One | September 9–11 | Category 1 hurricane | 90 (150) | 970 | None | None | None | |
| Two | September 12–19 | Category 3 hurricane | 115 (185) | 980 | Lesser Antilles (Puerto Rico), Greater Antilles (Dominican Republic, Cuba), Florida, the Bahamas, North Carolina, Virginia, Northeastern United States | >$30,000 | 32 | |
| Three | September 16–18 | Tropical storm | 60 (95) | Unknown | None | None | None | |
| Four | September 29 – October 5 | Category 2 hurricane | 105 (165) | Unknown | Lesser Antilles, Nicaragua | $5 million | 20 | |
| Five | October 12–23 | Category 3 hurricane | 115 (185) | 958 | Greater Antilles (Cuba), Florida, Bermuda | Unknown | Unknown | |
Season aggregates
| 5 systems | September 9 – October 23 | | 115 (185) | 958 | | >$5.03 million | 52 | |

== See also ==
- List of Florida hurricanes (pre-1900)
- List of North Carolina hurricanes (pre-1900)
- List of Puerto Rico hurricanes
- Tropical cyclone observation

== Bibliography ==
- Barnes, Jay (1995), North Carolina's Hurricane History, Chapel Hill, North Carolina: University of North Carolina Press, ISBN 9780807822012
- Duedall, Iver W.; Williams, John M. (2002), Florida Hurricanes and Tropical Storms, 1871-2001, University Press of Florida, ISBN 978-0813024943
- Kleinberg, Eliot (2003), Black Cloud: The Deadly Hurricane of 1928, Carroll and Graf, ISBN 0786711469
- Landsea, Christopher W. (2004), "The Atlantic hurricane database re-analysis project: Documentation for the 1851–1910 alterations and additions to the HURDAT database", in Murname, Richard J.; Liu, Kam-biu (eds.), Hurricanes and Typhoons: Past, Present and Future, New York City, New York: Columbia University Press, ISBN 0-231-12388-4
- Munroe, Ralph Middleton (1930), The Commodore's Story, Rumford Press, ASIN B00085QY84
- Oyer III, Harvey E. (2008), The American Jungle: The Adventures of Charlie Pierce, Middle River Press, ISBN 978-0981703602
- Pierce, Charles W. (1970), Donald W. Curl (ed.), Pioneer Life in Southeast Florida, University of Miami Press, ASIN B007T0707A
- Woodman, Jim (1972), Key Biscayne: The Romance of Cape Florida, ASIN B0006WVXQW
