= 1876 San Felipe hurricane =

Category 3 Atlantic hurricane in 1876

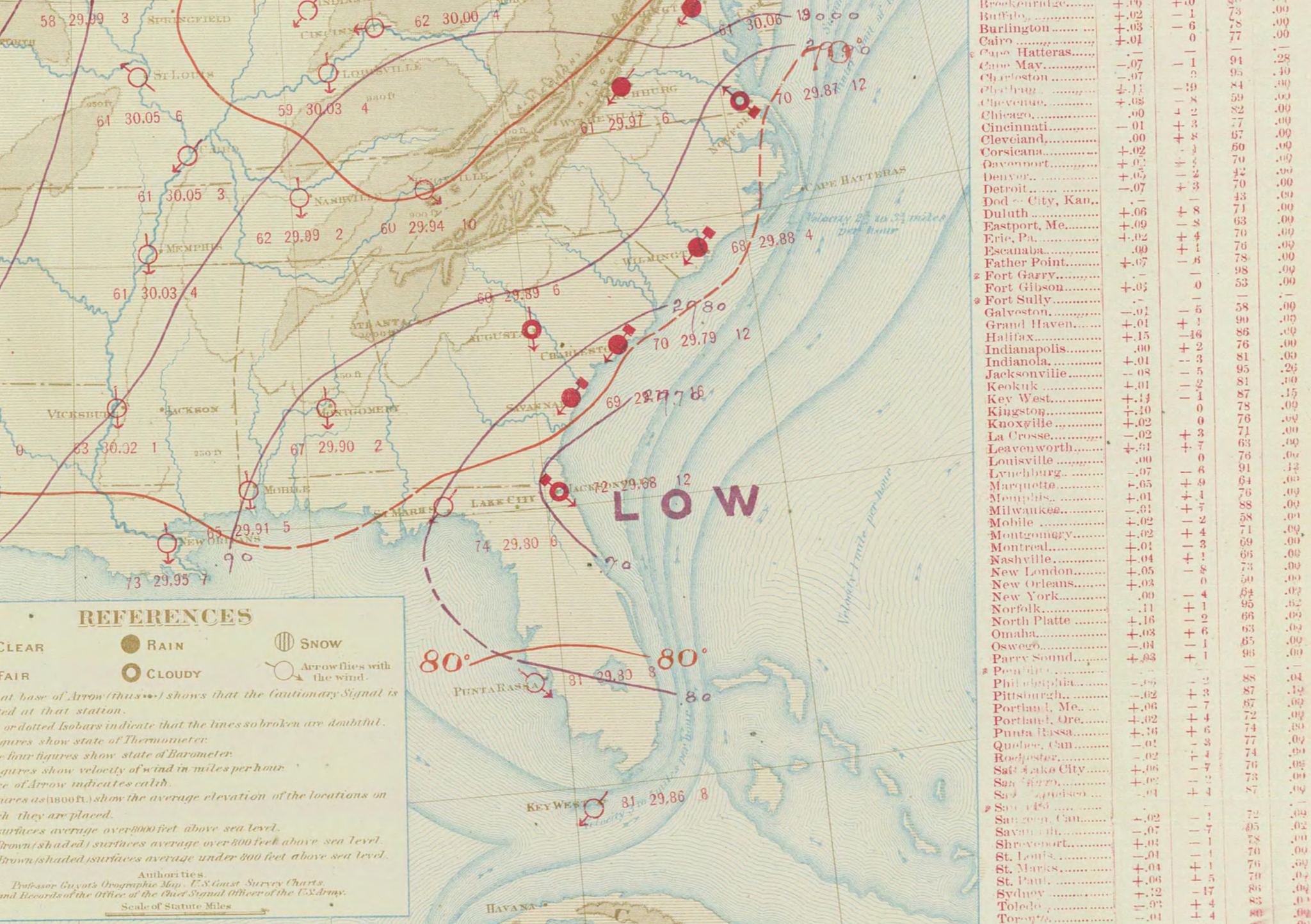
- Weather map of the hurricane nearing landfall in North Carolina on September 17

Meteorological history
- Formed: September 12, 1876
- Dissipated: September 19, 1876

Category 3 major hurricane
- 1-minute sustained (SSHWS/NWS)
- Highest winds: 120 mph (195 km/h)
- Lowest pressure: 980 mbar (hPa); 28.94 inHg

Overall effects
- Fatalities: 21
- Areas affected: Antigua, St. Kitts, Virgin Islands, Puerto Rico, Hispaniola, the Carolinas
- IBTrACS
- Part of the 1876 Atlantic hurricane season

The San Felipe Hurricane was the second tropical cyclone of the 1876 Atlantic hurricane season. The storm was first observed east of the Leeward Islands on September 12, later intensifying to a Category 3 hurricane on the modern-day Saffir–Simpson scale while approaching Puerto Rico. In the upcoming days, the storm would make landfall on Hispaniola and Cuba, while also at hurricane intensity. Weakening to a tropical storm, it crossed the island until emerging over central Cuba, and passing just east of Florida. The storm re-intensified into a hurricane and struck near Wilmington, North Carolina, as Category 1 hurricane. Continuing inland, the San Felipe Hurricane gradually weakened over the United States, reaching near Cape Cod before dissipation on September 19.

Many homes on Saint Thomas lost their roofs and fences, but impact from this storm was less than during comparable ones. Saint Croix, however, reportedly experienced its worst hurricane in 50 years, while Saint Kitts also suffered considerably. The storm was among the worst on Puerto Rico during the 19th century. In San Juan, the storm left few homes undamaged. Overflowing rivers and the storm itself carried away many bridges and caused significant losses to coffee, rice, and sugarcane estates. A total of 19 deaths were reported. At least 13 drownings occurred in North Carolina, two in Onslow County and eleven others after a ship sank at Portsmouth. Many other ships capsized along the coast of North Carolina. Flooding, damage to buildings, and uprooted trees were reported in Wilmington. The cyclone impacted several other states, particularly New Jersey, where the barrier islands in Cape May County alone tallied about $30,000 in damage.

== Meteorological history ==
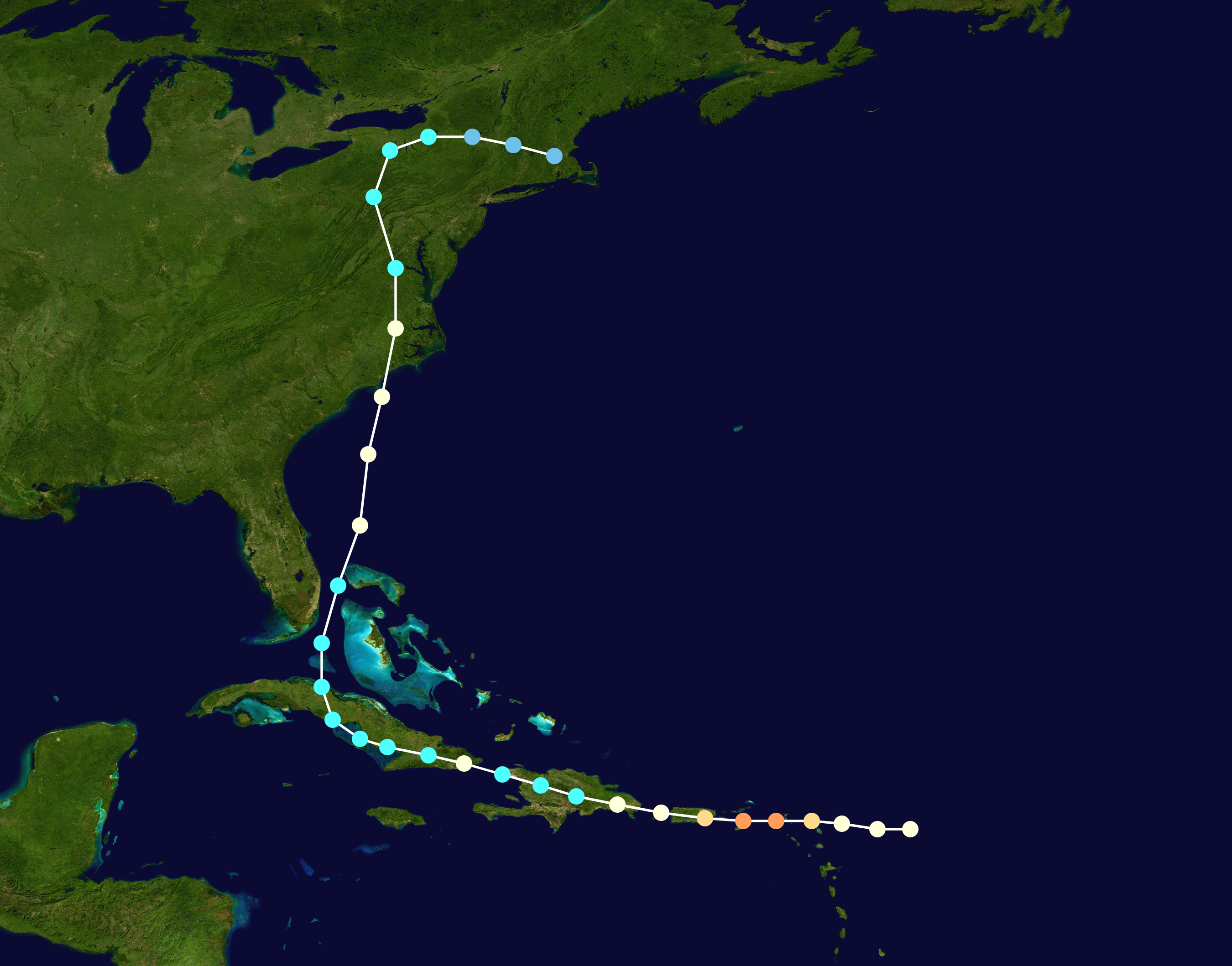
Map plotting the storm's track and intensity, according to the Saffir–Simpson scale Map key Saffir–Simpson scale Tropical depression (≤38 mph, ≤62 km/h) Tropical storm (39–73 mph, 63–118 km/h) Category 1 (74–95 mph, 119–153 km/h) Category 2 (96–110 mph, 154–177 km/h) Category 3 (111–129 mph, 178–208 km/h) Category 4 (130–156 mph, 209–251 km/h) Category 5 (≥157 mph, ≥252 km/h) Unknown Storm type Tropical cyclone Subtropical cyclone Extratropical cyclone, remnant low, tropical disturbance, or monsoon depression

The Atlantic hurricane best track begins the track of this system about 215 mi (345 km) east of Barbuda early on September 12, the first day when the Lesser Antilles observed strong winds and decreasing atmospheric pressures. However, the bark Mary M. Williams reportedly encountered this storm before that day. An unofficial study by Michael Chenoweth in 2014 found that the storm originated between West Africa and the Lesser Antilles on October 10. Considered a Category 1 hurricane on the modern-day Saffir–Simpson scale at the beginning of its track, the storm moved generally westward and passed either or over Anguilla, Saint Barthélemy, and Saint Martin late on September 12. By early the next day, the cyclone briefly intensified into a Category 3 hurricane, peaking with winds of 115 mph (185 km/h), several hours before striking Puerto Rico between Yabucoa and Humacao. A 2003 reanalysis by the Atlantic hurricane reanalysis project estimated this intensity based on the damage that occurred in Puerto Rico. Also according to a study of impacts on the island, Father Benito Viñes calculated that the cyclone had a small diameter of about 185 mi (300 km). Humacao recorded an atmospheric pressure of 979 mbar (28.9 inHg), the lowest in relation to the storm.

The system moved west-northwestward across the Mona Passage and struck the Dominican Republic, weakening to a tropical storm on September 14 as it traversed Hispaniola. The storm briefly re-attained Category 1 hurricane status while crossing the Windward Passage early on September 15, based on a 2000 re-analysis by meteorologist Louis A. Pérez Jr., and soon made landfall in Cuba near San Antonio del Sur. Weakening to a tropical storm, the cyclone continued west-northwestward until turning northward over the central part Cuba early on September 16, several hours before emerging into the far southwestern Atlantic. At 18:00 UTC, the system passed about 30 mi (48 km) west of Grand Bahama and about 40 mi (64 km) east of present-day Palm Beach, Florida. Based on land and ship observations, the storm re-intensified into a hurricane on September 17, though Chenoweth's study found that it had remained a hurricane over the past three days. The hurricane made landfall in North Carolina between Surf City and Topsail Beach around 14:00 UTC with winds of 90 mph (150 km/h). Moving parabolically across the interior of the United States, the cyclone weakened to a tropical storm over Virginia early on September 18 and to a tropical depression about 24 hours later over New York. Late on September 19, the depression dissipated near Cape Cod, Massachusetts.

== Impact ==
A newspaper on Saint Thomas noted that many homes lost their roofs and fences, but that impact from this storm was less than during other cyclones, such as in 1867 and 1871. Saint Croix, however, reportedly experienced its worst hurricane in 50 years, while Saint Kitts also suffered considerably. In the former, the hurricane's impact in Christiansted was "not so great as might have been expected from the fury of the storm". Outside of Christiansted, however, particularly between Kingshill and Recovery Hill, the cyclone damaged a fort, a hospital, a schoolhouse, and 63 homes to some degree, destroying 22. Both Saint Kitts and Saint Thomas observed sustained windspeeds up to 81 mph (130 km/h). Although the storm also lashed Tortola with high winds, little impact occurred aside from one or two sloops being beached.

Although considered one of the most severe 19th century tropical cyclones on Puerto Rico, it caused less impact than the Santa Ana hurricane of 1825, San Narciso hurricane of 1867, or San Ciriaco hurricane of 1899. Scientist and scholar Benito Viñes went to Puerto Rico from Cuba to conduct a study to calculate the damages of the hurricane. A more recent study, published in 2004, determined that impacts on the island in some cases reached the equivalency of an F3 tornado, although F2-level damage was widespread. The 1876 San Felipe hurricane became the first in which rainfall on Puerto Rico was measured using a rain gauge. San Felipe affected Puerto Rico for 10 hours, killing 19 people. However, historians suspected the Spanish Government withheld the actual damage and death toll data for Puerto Rico, due to the potential for commerce to suffer negative impacts. In San Juan, rainfall reached 4.71 in (120 mm) over a 24 hour period. In the city, the storm left few homes undamaged. Overflowing rivers and the storm itself carried away many bridges and caused significant losses to coffee, rice, and sugarcane estates. After the storm, authorities designated Junta Local de Beneficienca, or local groups to collect donations for storm victims in each town. The storm was called the "San Felipe hurricane" because it struck on September 13, the feast day of Saint Philip, father of Saint Eugenia of Rome. Exactly 52 years later, Puerto Rico was struck by Hurricane San Felipe Segundo.

Weather stations on Cuba reported decreasing atmospheric pressures, including 999 mbar (29.5 inHg) in Sagua La Grande. Winds in the Bahamas reached 88 mph (142 km/h) at Cay Sal during the storm.

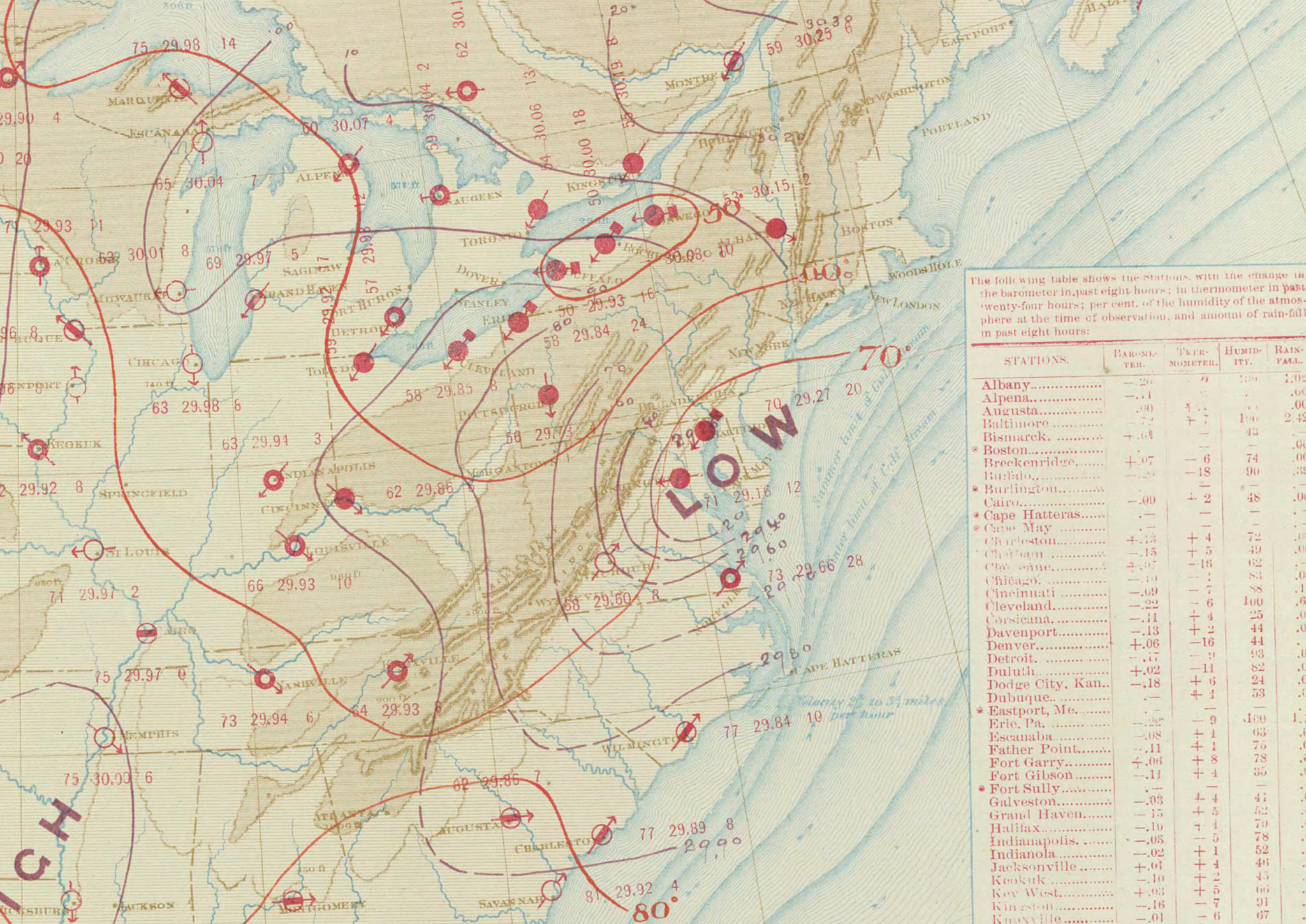
Weather map of the storm over the Mid-Atlantic in the afternoon on September 17

North Carolina observed sustained winds of 73 mph (117 km/h) at Cape Hatteras before the anemometer was disabled. At least two drownings occurred in Onslow. Flooding, damage to buildings, and uprooted trees were reported from Wilmington. A bridge across Market Street there was washed away. Many ships capsized, including one at Wrightsville Beach that contained 1,400 terrapin. Cape Henry in Virginia observed 5-minute sustained windspeeds of 78 mph (126 km/h) and up to 8.32 in (211 mm) of rainfall. Of that, 7.18 in (182 mm) of precipitation fell on September 16, the highest daily total in the month of September. High tides impacted Washington, D.C., peaking at 7.9 ft (2.4 m) above low water datum.

In Pennsylvania, gale-force winds impacted Philadelphia, downing many trees in the city, especially along east-to-west roads. Damage to awnings, chimneys, and signs was also common. At least six stores partially lost their roofs. Winds also toppled some signs and sheds at the Centennial Exposition fairgrounds, though few large buildings suffered serious damage, with the exception of a hotel and restaurant. The New York Times declared the cyclone "one of the most severe ever known along the coast of New Jersey." Damage on the barrier islands of Cape May County reached $30,000. In New York, rainfall flooded many basements and several streets in New York City, while winds felled trees that blocked other roads. Abnormally high tides capsized several small boats along the coast, especially at Staten Island, and about 250 bathhouses at Rockaway and many others at Coney Island were swept away. Additionally, The Sun reported that Hog Island "is a thing of the past" because "the storm made a clean sweep" of that island. Overall, however, The Sun noted that "New York City gained more than she lost by the storm" due to rainfall replenishing nearby waterways, with up to 2.4 in (61 mm) of precipitation at the New Croton Dam.

== See also ==
- Tropical cyclone
- 1876 Atlantic hurricane season
