= Bill Baggs Cape Florida State Park =

State park located in Key Biscayne, Florida, USA

Bill Baggs Cape Florida State Recreation Area
- IUCN category IV (habitat/species management area)
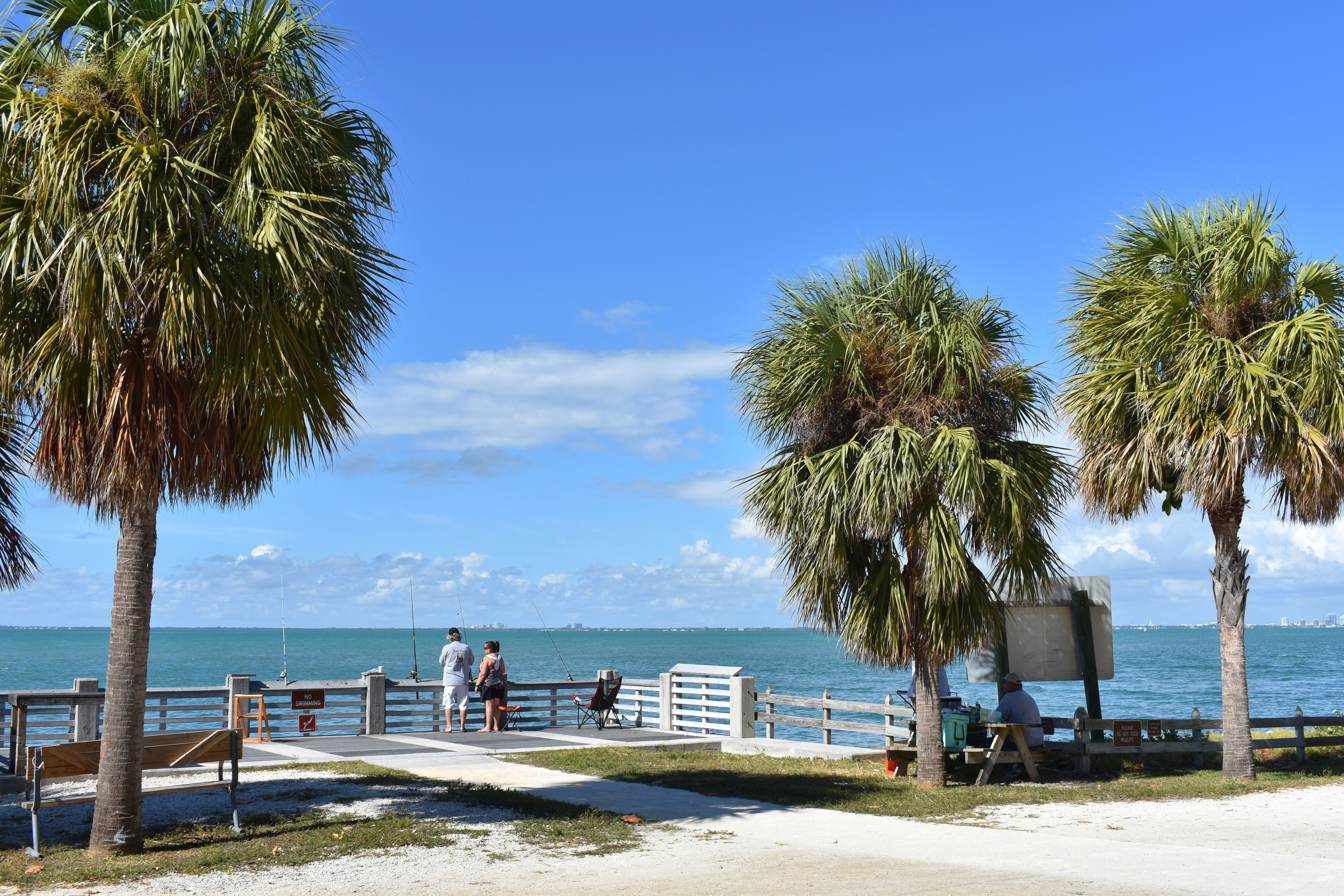

- Location within Florida Location within the United States
- Interactive map of Bill Baggs Cape Florida State Recreation Area
- Location: 1200 South Crandon Boulevard; Miami-Dade County, Florida, U.S.
- Nearest city: Key Biscayne, Florida
- Coordinates: 25°40′25″N 80°09′34″W
- Area: 400 acres (160 ha)
- Established: 1967
- Visitors: 850,000 (in 2004)
- Governing body: Florida Department of Environmental Protection

Bill Baggs Cape Florida State Park occupies approximately the southern third of the island of Key Biscayne, at coordinates 25°40′25″N 80°09′34″W. This park includes the Cape Florida Light, the oldest standing structure in Greater Miami. In 2005, Cape Florida was ranked as having the 8th best beach in the country, and in 2013 Forbes ranked it at 7th.

The park was named in honor of Bill Baggs, editor of The Miami News from 1957 until his death in 1969. He worked to protect the land from development and to preserve some of the key in its natural state.

In 2004 a large historical marker was erected at the site to mark it as part of the National Underground Railroad Network to Freedom Trail, as hundreds of Black Seminoles, many fugitive slaves, escaped from here to freedom in the Bahamas, settling mostly on Andros Island. In the early 1820s, some 300 American slaves reached the Bahamas, aboard 27 sloops and many canoes. The US National Park Service is working with the Bahamas, particularly the African Bahamanian Museum and Research Center (ABAC) in Nassau, to develop interpretive programs at Red Bays, Andros.

== Recreational activities ==
The park has more than a mile of sandy Atlantic beachfront, where snorkeling and swimming is possible. Besides the beach and tours of the lighthouse and keeper's quarters, activities include boating, canoeing, kayaking and fishing from the seawall along Biscayne Bay, bicycling, hiking and wildlife viewing. The park has such amenities as picnicking areas and youth camping. It also has a visitor center, a museum with interpretive exhibits and concessions. No Name Harbor, a natural harbor in the park, is used for anchorage.

== Flora and fauna ==
More than 260 bird species, including piping plovers and peregrine falcons, have been seen in the park. There are also over 50 species of butterflies, including the statira butterfly. In summer, the beach provides a nesting site for loggerhead sea turtles. Florida manatees, green and leatherback sea turtles forage offshore in seagrass meadows, and American crocodiles also are known to find refuge in this coastal park.

In 1992, Hurricane Andrew destroyed many of the invasive Australian pines that had established themselves in the park, allowing for further restoration of native flora in habitats such as marine hammocks and mangrove forests. Multiple species plants identified by as imperiled are protected by the park, including beach jacquemontia, Biscayne prickly-ash and Atlantic Coast Florida lantana (Lantana depressa var. floridana).

The park is home to the Cape Florida Banding Station (CFBS), which was established in 2002 to monitor how the restored habitat supports migrating songbirds and regional migration patterns. In 2021, the station banded its 40,000th bird and in September 2025, reached the 50,000th.

== Hours ==
Florida state parks are open between 8 a.m. and sundown every day of the year (including holidays).

== Gallery ==
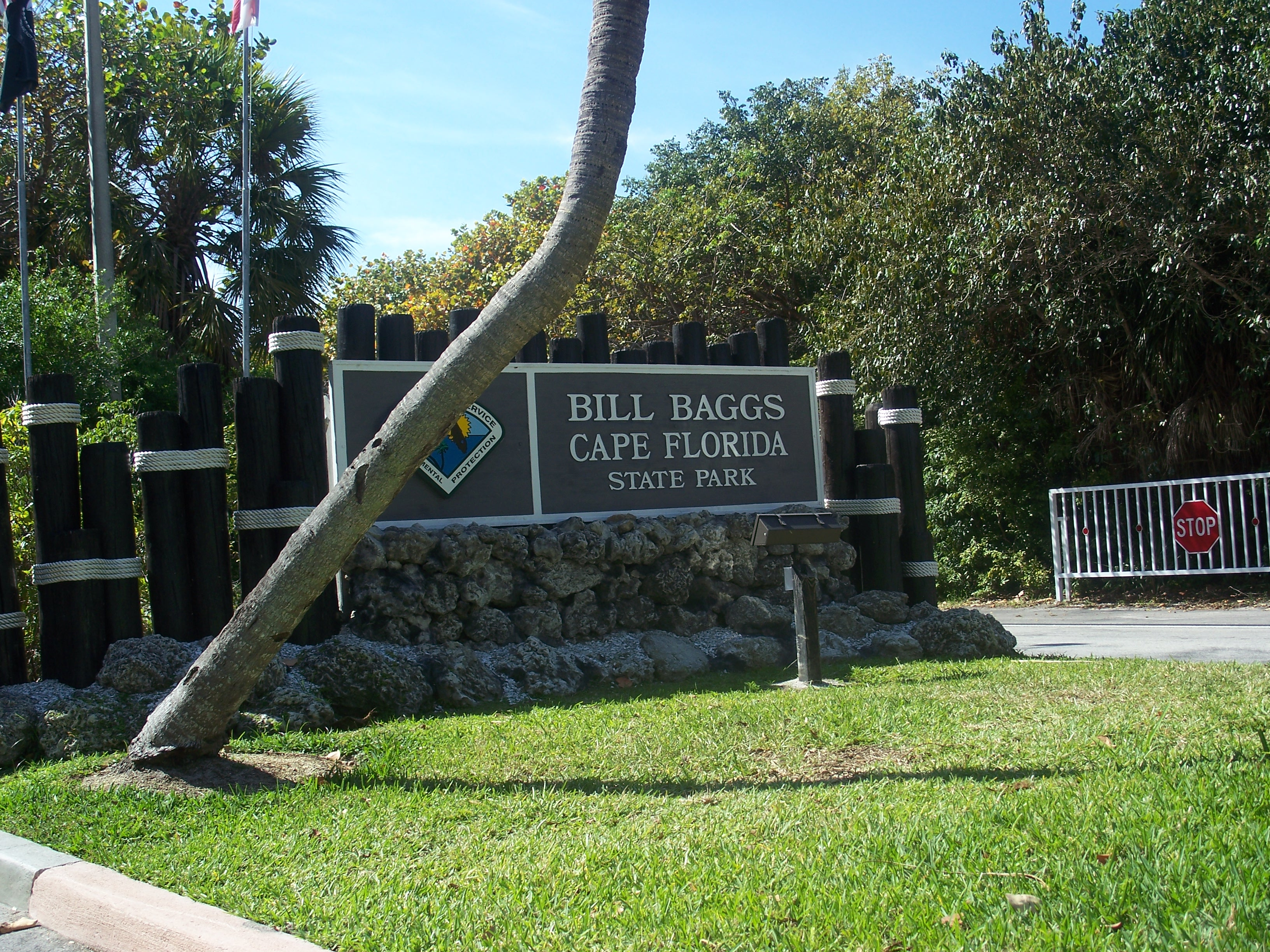
Entryway

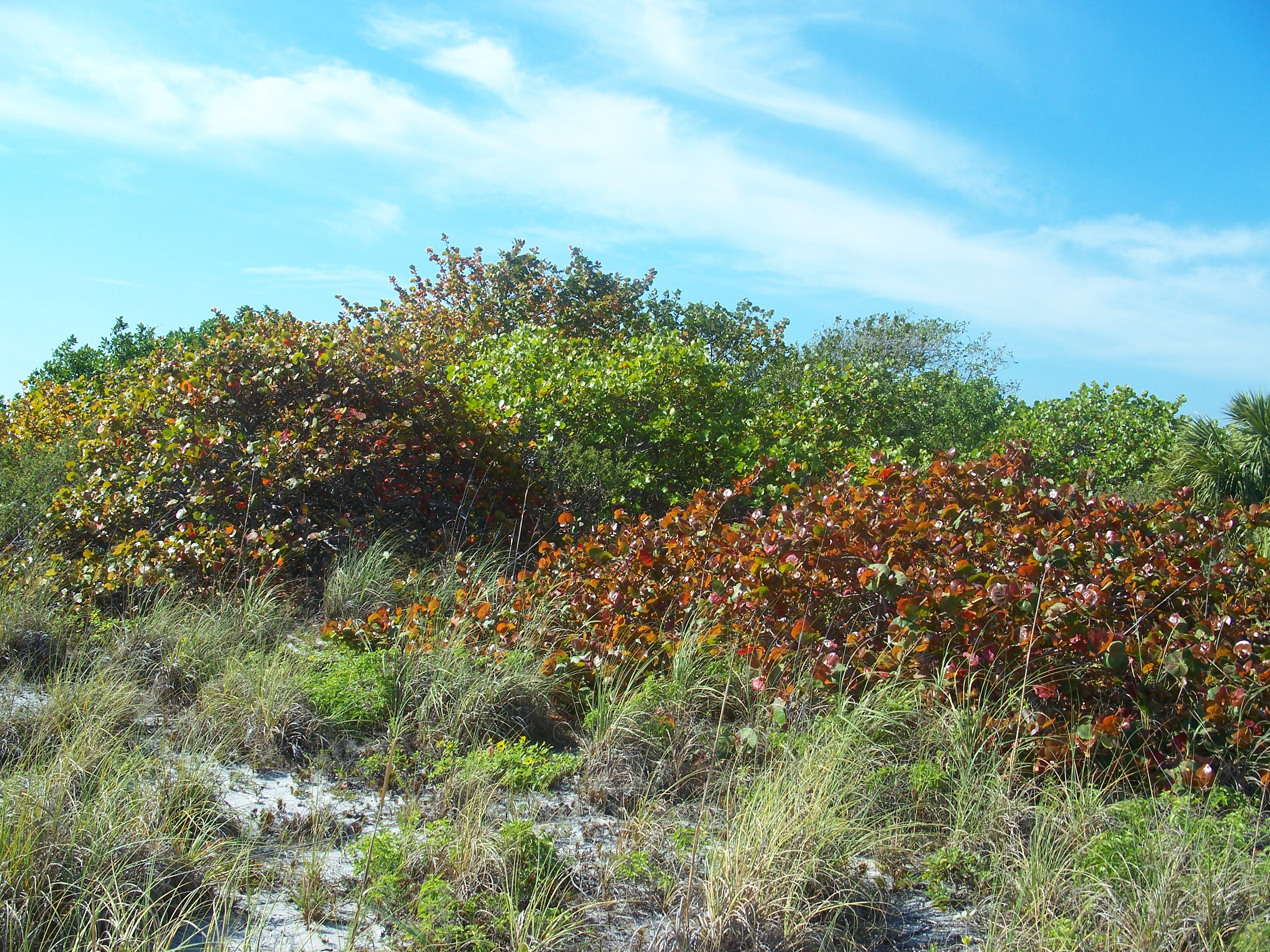
Sea grapes at the park

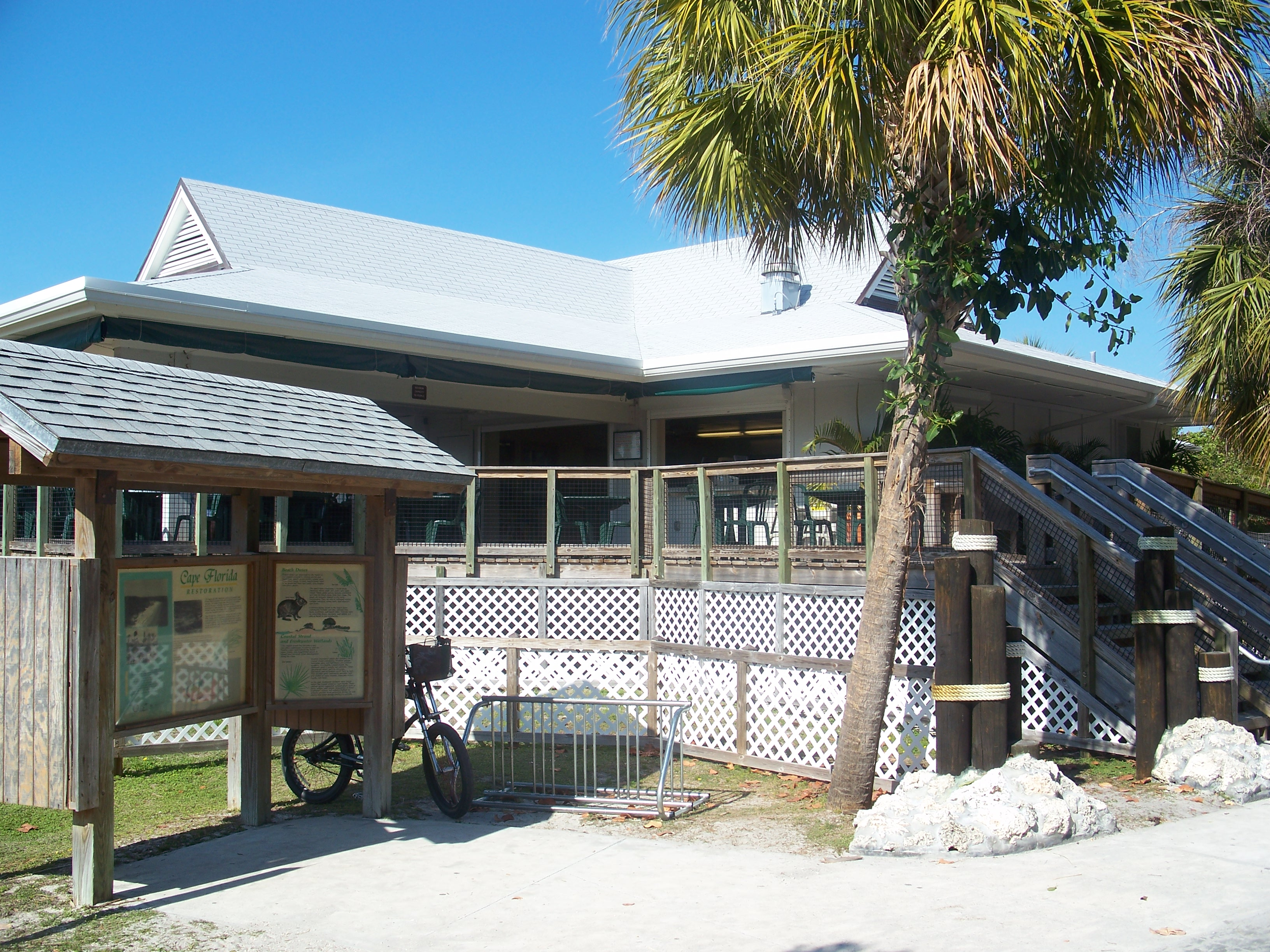
Interpretive kiosk and building

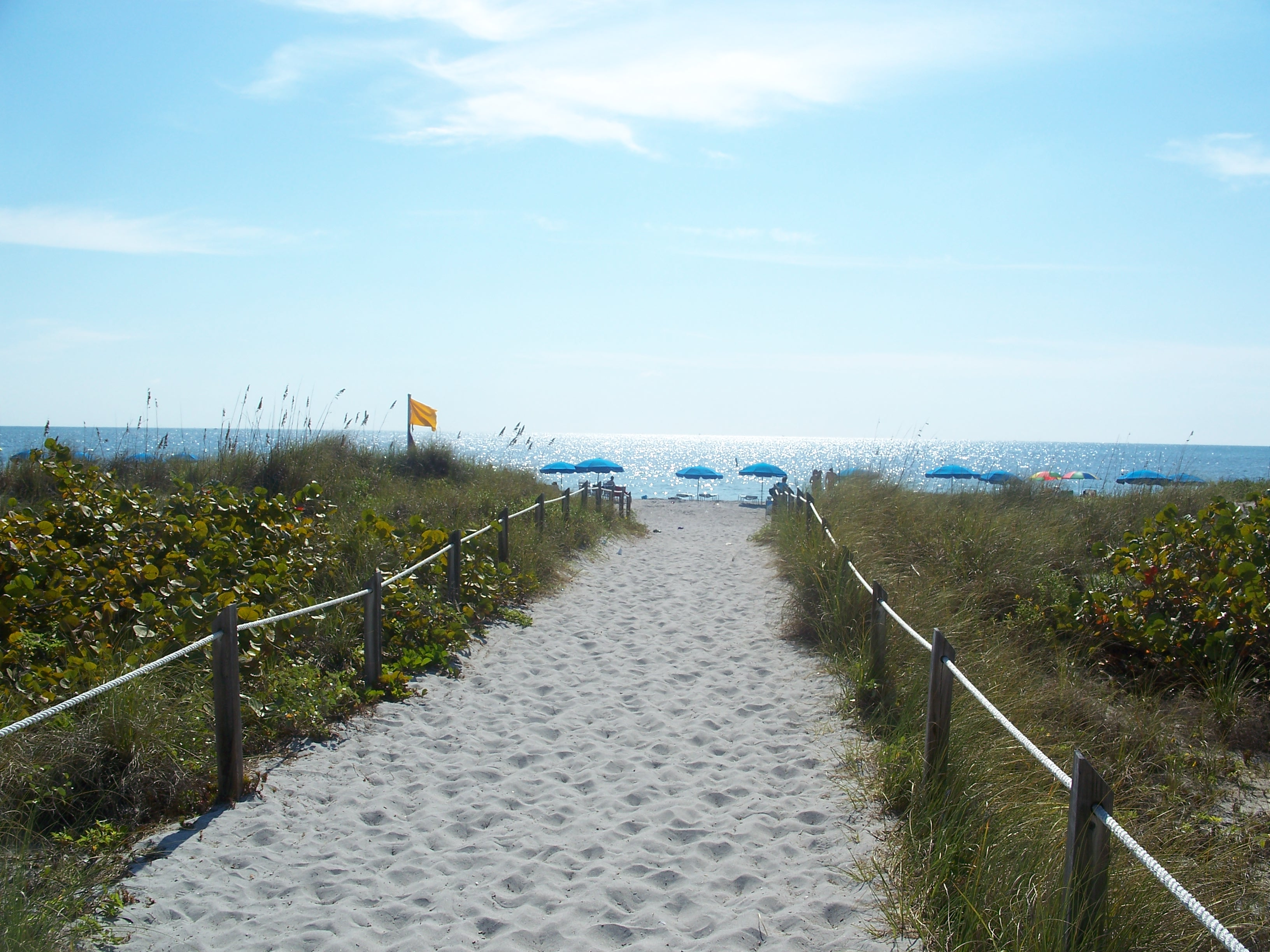
Path leading to the beach

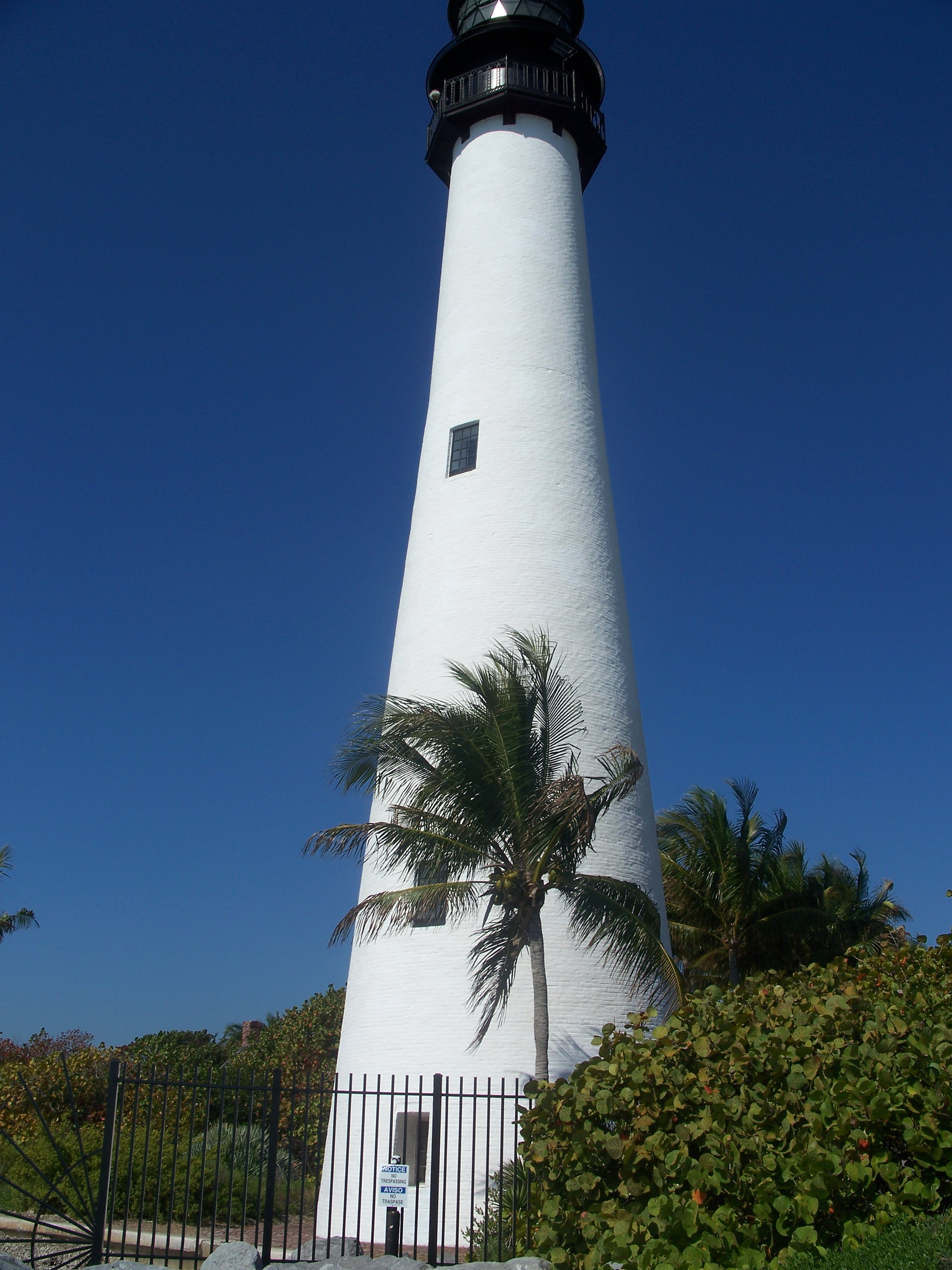
Cape Florida Lighthouse

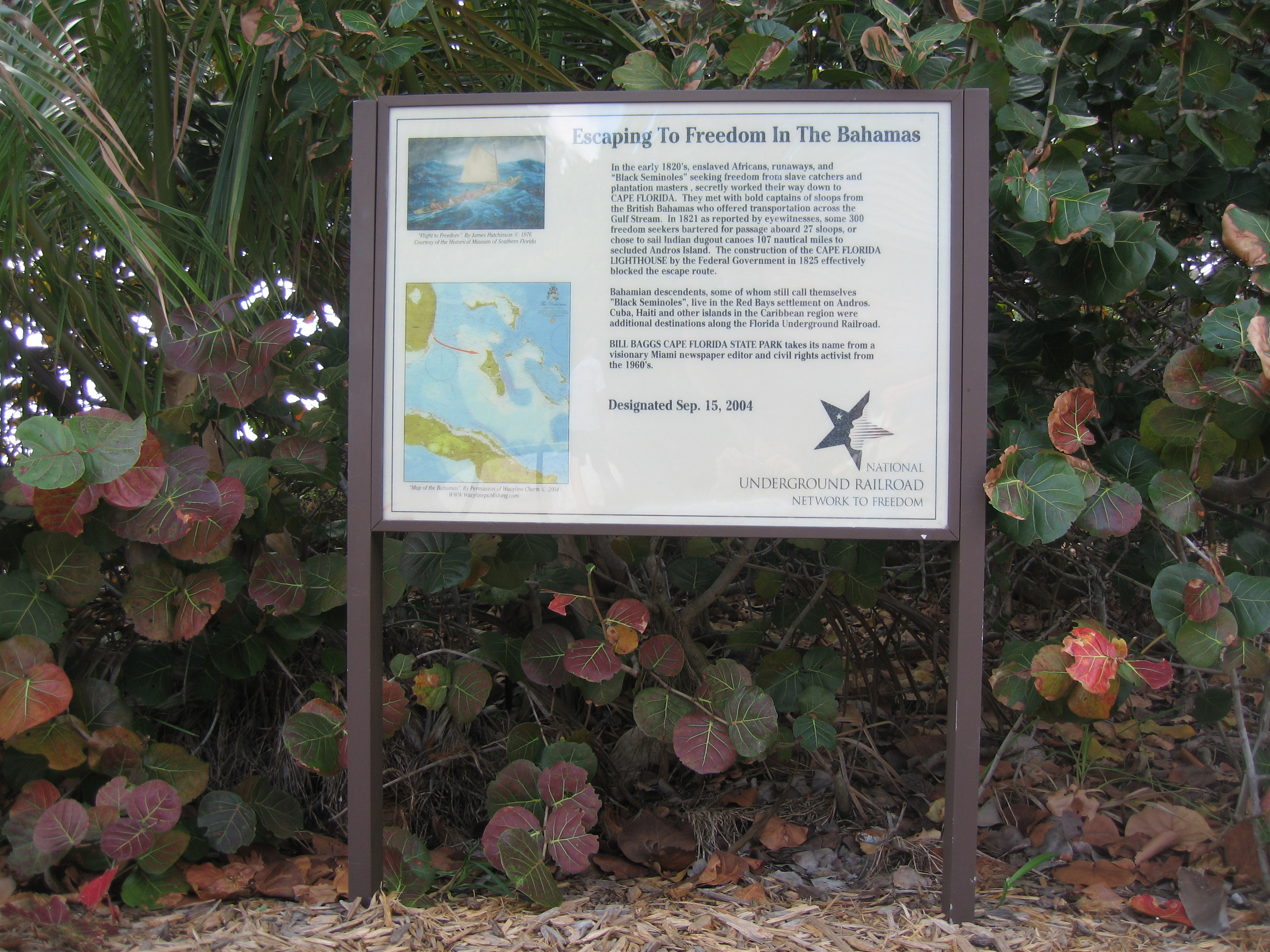
Sign commemorating Black Seminoles who escaped from Cape Florida in the early 1820s to the Bahamas
