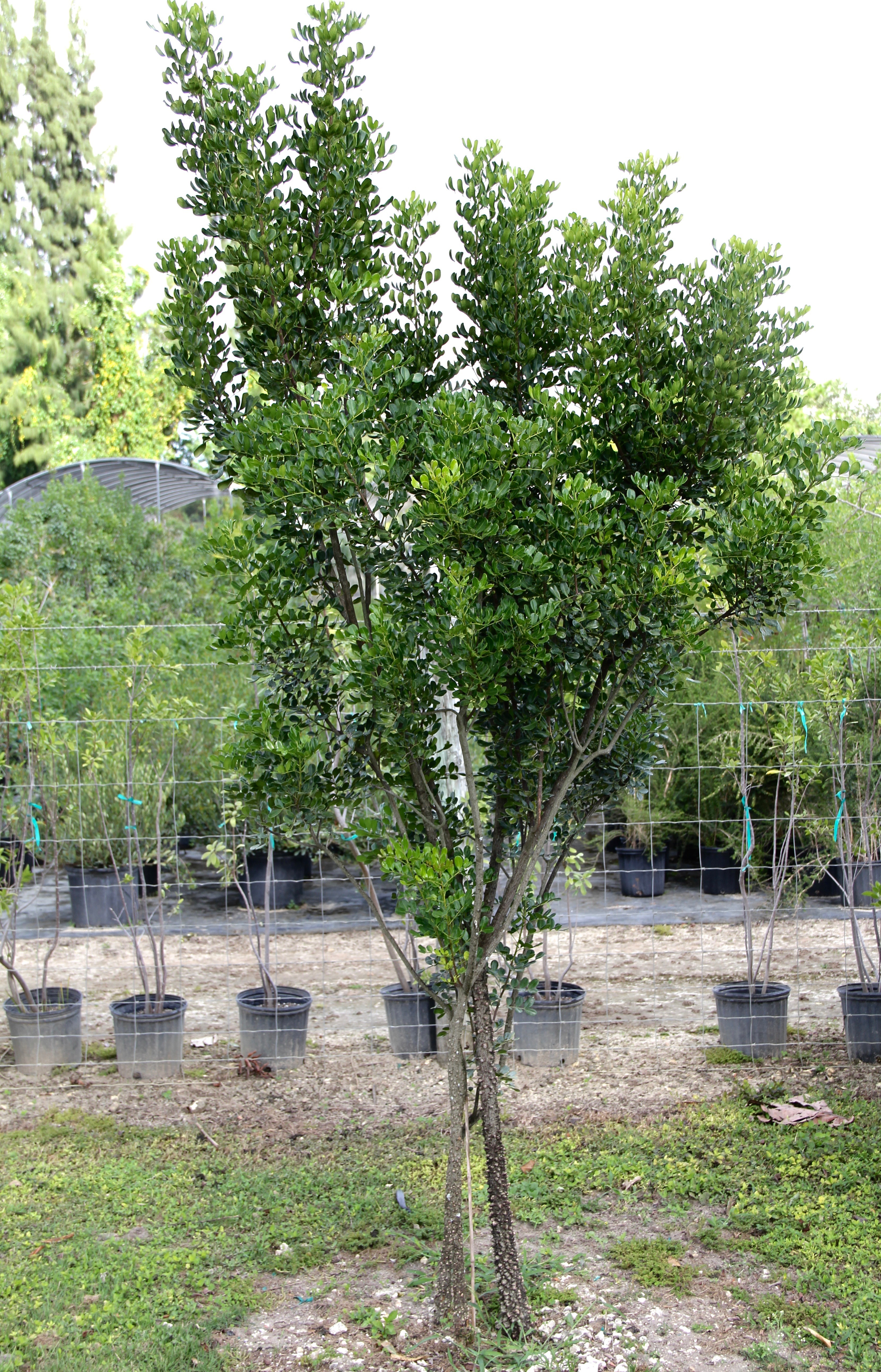

Conservation status
- Apparently Secure (NatureServe)

Scientific classification
- Kingdom: Plantae
- Clade: Tracheophytes
- Clade: Angiosperms
- Clade: Eudicots
- Clade: Rosids
- Order: Sapindales
- Family: Rutaceae
- Genus: Zanthoxylum
- Species: Z. spinosum

Binomial name
- Zanthoxylum spinosum (Sw.) Sw.

Synonyms
- Fagara coriacea (A.Rich.) Engl.; Fagara curbeloi (Alain) Kereszty; Fagara emarginata Sw.; Fagara sapindoides (DC.) Krug & Urb.; Fagara spinosa Sw.; Tobinia coriacea Desv.; Tobinia emarginata (Sw.) Desv.; Tobinia spinosa (Sw.) Desv.; Zanthoxylum coriaceum A.Rich.; Zanthoxylum curbeloi Alain; Zanthoxylum emarginatum (Sw.) Sw.; Zanthoxylum sapindoides DC.; Sapindus spinosus L.

= Zanthoxylum spinosum =

Species of flowering plant

Zanthoxylum spinosum is a species of flowering plant in the family Rutaceae, known by the common name Biscayne prickly-ash. It is native to the West Caribbean, including South Florida and the Florida Keys, Cuba, Bahamas, Cayman Islands, and Hispaniola.

This species is a shrub or tree growing up to 7 meters tall, covered in prickles. The leaves are up to 18 centimeters long and are divided into several leaflets. Flowers are borne in cymes, each with three sepals and three petals. The round, glandular fruits are borne in clusters.

This plant grows on coastal hammocks, beaches, maritime woodlands and scrub, with a rocky substrate contains limestone. Associated species include Metopium toxiferum, Coccoloba uvifera, Ardisia escallonioides, Guapira discolor, and Psychotria nervosa.

This species may act as host to Toxoptera citricida, the brown citrus aphid.
