= No Name Harbor (Key Biscayne) =

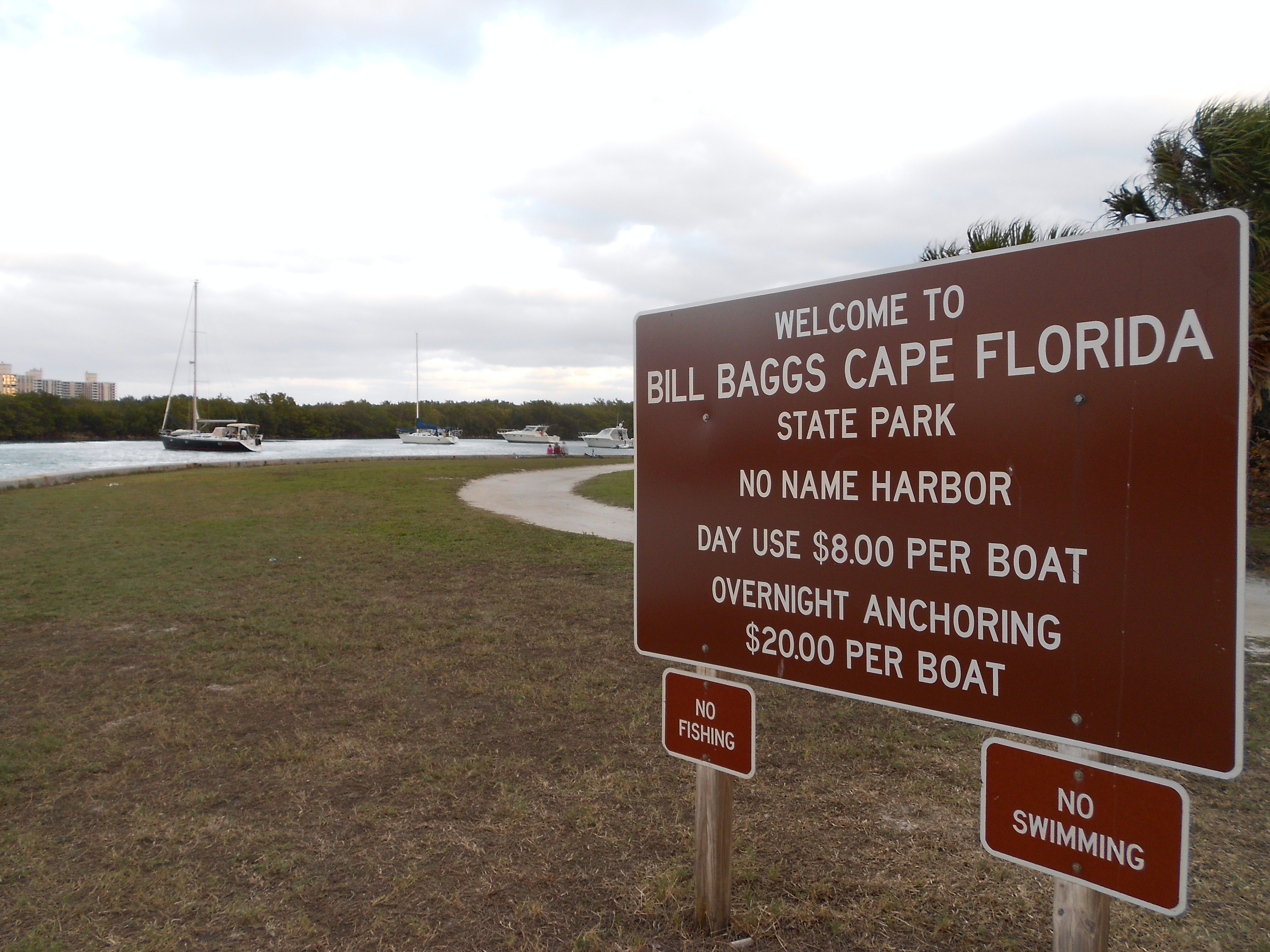
- View of No Name Harbor
- Interactive map of No Name Harbor
- Location in Florida

Location
- Country: United States
- Location: Key Biscayne, Miami-Dade County, Florida
- Coordinates: 25°40′36″N 80°09′46″W

No Name Harbor is a natural harbor on Key Biscayne, Florida. It is located within the boundaries of Bill Baggs Cape Florida State Park. In the 19th century, the site served as a food-rich rookery for herons, egrets, and other species of wildlife. Originally, the site was privately owned prior to the creation of the state park. Several development plans indicated the land was slated for the construction of condominiums and residential homes. The surrounding land was cleared for development in the 1950s, and charts identified the body of water as "No Name Harbor". The plans failed, and the harbor's name was retained.
