= Looe Key National Marine Sanctuary =

Former aquatic protected area in the Florida Keys

- IUCN category V (protected landscape/seascape)
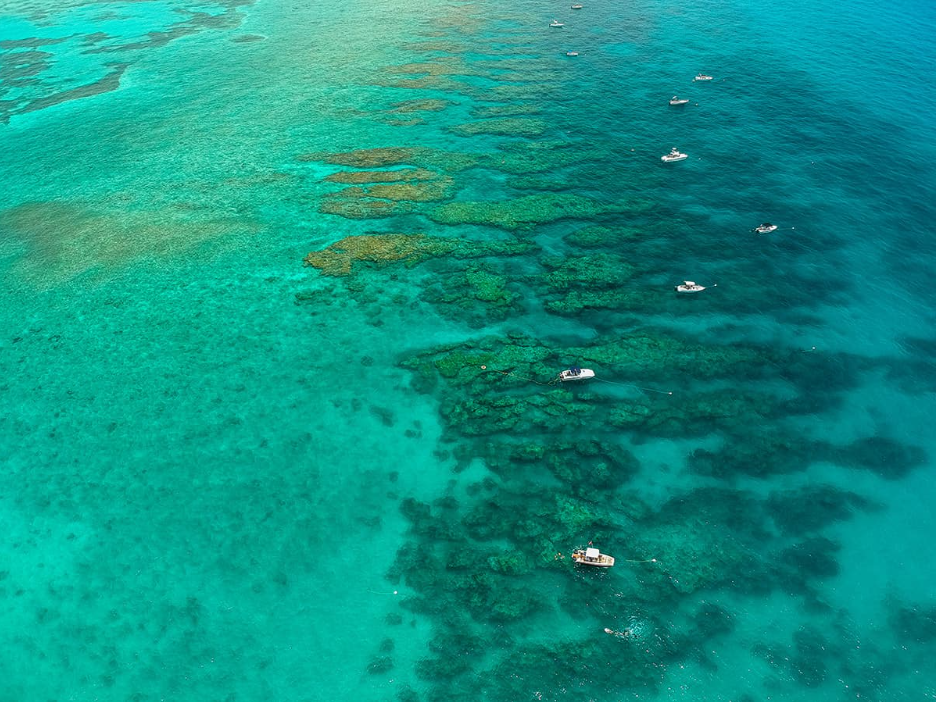
- Looe Key

- Location within Florida Location within the United States
- Location: Looe Key in the Florida Keys
- Coordinates: 24°32′55″N 081°24′21″W
- Area: 7.04 sq mi (18.2 km^{2})
- Designated: January 16, 1981; 45 years ago
- Disestablished: November 16, 1990; 35 years ago (subsumed; see text); July 1, 1997; 29 years ago (integrated; see text)
- Governing body: NOAA Office of National Marine Sanctuaries

The Looe Key National Marine Sanctuary was a National Marine Sanctuary in the waters in the Florida Keys in Florida in the United States that existed from 1981 to 1990. It protected Looe Key, a coral reef south of Big Pine Key. In 1990, it was subsumed by the new Florida Keys National Marine Sanctuary, which included its waters. However, it continued to operate until 1997, when it was fully integrated into the Florida Keys sanctuary. At that time, its waters were redesignated the "Looe Key Existing Management Area," which sometimes still is referred to informally as the "Looe Key National Marine Sanctuary."

== Description ==
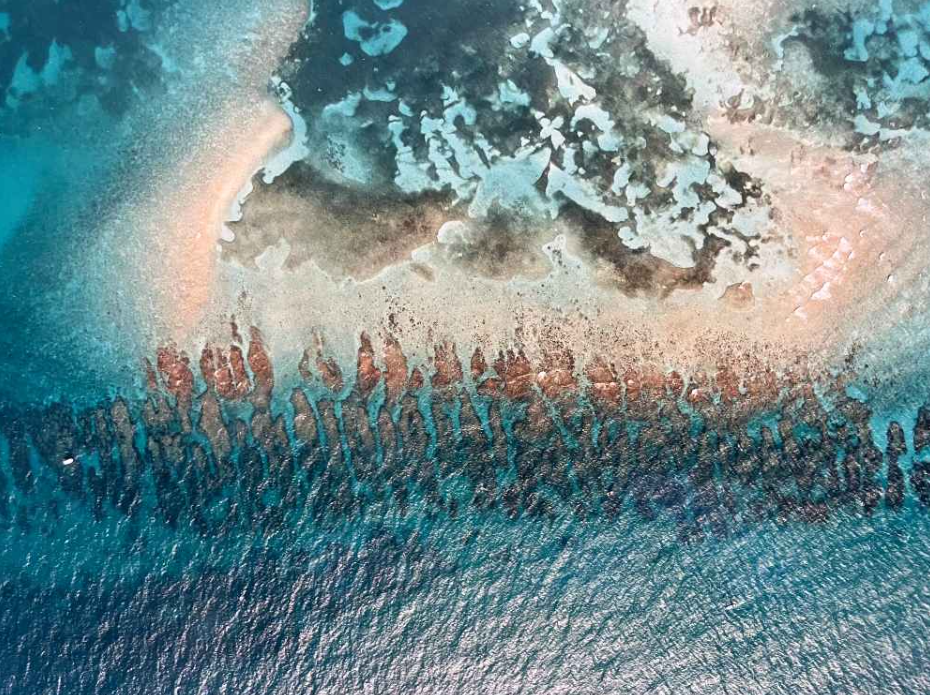
A February 1992 satellite photo of Looe Key, revealing its spur and groove formations.

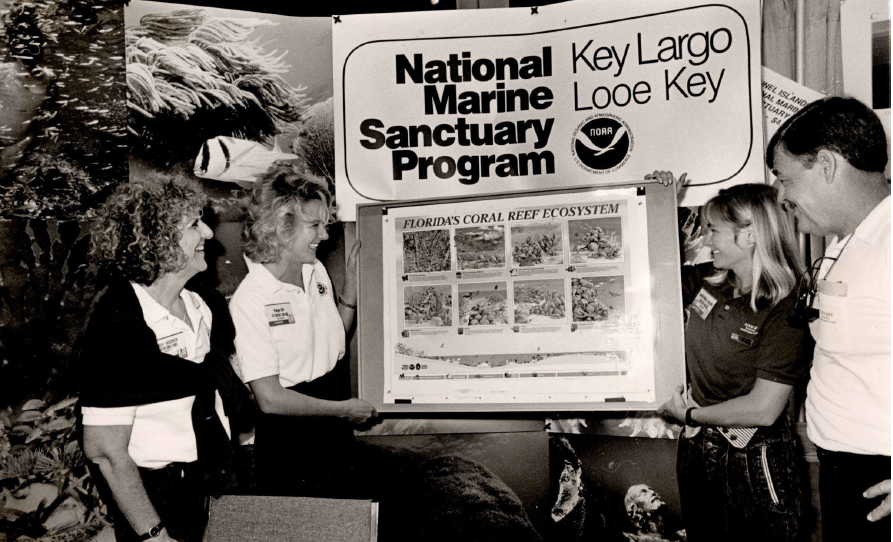
Staff members pose with a poster for the Key Largo and Looe Key national marine sanctuaries in the 1980s.

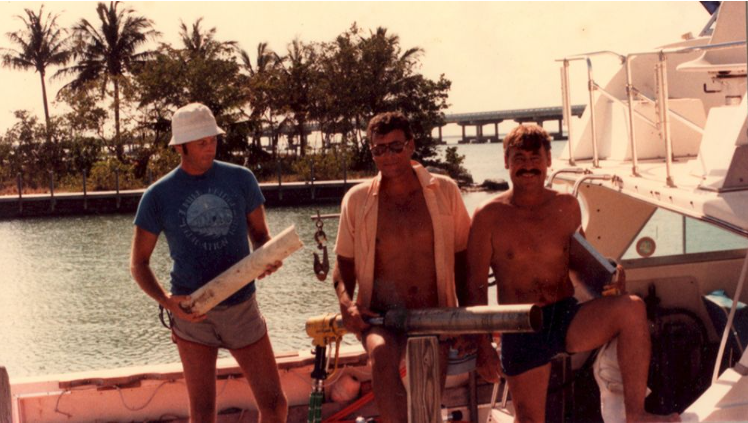
Preparation of mooring buoys at the sanctuary in the 1980s.

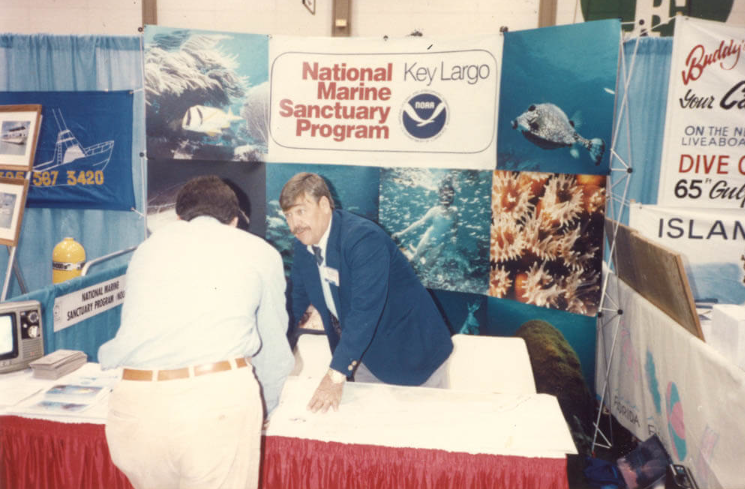
Looe Key National Marine Sanctuary Superintendent Billy Causey answers questions for a member of the public at an event in the late 1980s.

Looe Key is a 5.8-square-mile (4.4 sq nmi; 15.0 km^{2}) coral reef in the Florida Reef system named for the British Royal Navy warship HMS Looe, which was wrecked on it in 1744 when it was a sandy island. The Looe Key National Marine Sanctuary lay 6.3 miles (5.5 nmi; 10.1 km) south of Ramrod Key and a little more than 9 miles (7.8 nmi; 14 km) southwest of Bahia Honda State Park. It was a protected area which covered an area of 5.32 square nautical miles (7.04 sq mi; 18.2 km^{2}) that included Looe Key, one of the most popular recreational diving and snorkeling sites in the world.

== Fauna ==
Looe Key is a spur and groove coral reef. A diversity of fishes congregate at the reef, including parrotfish and surgeonfish on its north side, barracudas and jacks (family Carangidae) on top of it, and grunt sculpins, butterflyfish, and angelfish (family Pomacanthidae) on its crest.

== History ==
Between the late 1950s and the mid-1970s, concerns grew over the need to protect and preserve the Florida Reef — the coral reefs of the Florida Keys — from damage in the face of the burgeoning tourism industry in the region, leading to the creation of Florida's John Pennekamp Coral Reef State Park off Key Largo in 1960 as the first underwater park in the United States. Later, as environmental degradation continued, the National Oceanic and Atmospheric Administration (NOAA) designated the Key Largo National Marine Sanctuary on December 18, 1975.

To further protect coral reefs in the Florida Keys, a coalition of citizen groups and nongovernmental organizations in 1977 recommended Looe Key for consideration as a national marine sanctuary to protect the high biodiversity of fish in its waters. A public workshop on the matter followed in 1978, and in August 1979 NOAA added Looe Key to its List of Recommended Areas. Amid concerns that the designation of the sanctuary would put local commercial fishing interests out of business, regional fishery management councils for the Atlantic Ocean and Gulf of Mexico sides of the Florida Keys request that NOAA delayed its initiation of the designation process. In May 1980, finally began the designation process when it released a draft plan for the proposed sanctuary. NOAA finalized the plan and designated the Looe Key National Marine Sanctuary on January 16, 1981, the same day it designated the Gray's Reef National Marine Sanctuary and the Gulf of the Farallones National Marine Sanctuary (later renamed the Greater Farallones National Marine Sanctuary). They were the third, fourth, and fifth U.S. national marine sanctuaries. Concerns over a negative impact on commercial fishing proved unfounded, sanctuary management developed a good working relationship with the local business community, and businesses that relied on a healthy coral reef system in the area thrived after the sanctuary's creation.

In 1980, NOAA entered into a cooperative agreement with the Florida Department of National Resources (which later became part of the Florida Department of Environmental Protection) under which Florida state employees operated the Key Largo National Marine Sanctuary with the United States Government fully funding their salaries. After the Looe Key National Marine Sanctuary was designated in 1981, NOAA and the State of Florida cooperated in the same way in managing it. During the 1980s, the Looe Key and Key Largo national marine sanctuaries became models for managing marine protected areas, both within the United States and internationally.

The Looe Key National Marine Sanctuary implemented the National Marine Sanctuary program's first zoning system in 1983. A mooring buoy system — which protects coral reefs and seagrass beds from anchor damage by making anchoring unnecessary — was installed in the sanctuary in 1984. In 1984, the sanctuary hosted the first annual underwater music festival.

On August 4, 1984, the Cypriot-flagged motor cargo vessel MV Wellwood ran aground on Molasses Reef within the Key Largo National Marine Sanctuary, inflicting significant damage on the reef. Staff from both the Looe Key and Key Largo sanctuaries responded as soon as the incident was reported and remained on the scene during a 12-day United States Coast Guard-led effort to refloat Wellwood and remove her from the reef.

Research at the sanctuary between 1983 and 1985 demonstrated a marked increase in fish populations after the prohibition of spearfishing. In 1985, a Miami Herald travel writer deemed Looe Key one of the world's top ten destinations for recreational diving.

In 1986, the Looe Key National Marine Sanctuary teamed up with the Key Largo National Marine Sanctuary to hold a joint underwater photography contest. In the 1980s, NOAA worked with the Miami Herald to produce an article on the high rate of boat groundings in the two sanctuaries and with United Press International to produce a feature article on the impact of underwater diving on coral reefs. Both articles were part of an effort to draw the public's attention to the detrimental effect of human activities on the reef systems in the Florida Keys.

The first large-scale coral bleaching event in the lower Florida Keys was recorded in 1979, and during the 1980s water quality and other environmental conditions in the Florida Keys continued to decline despite the designation of the Looe Key and Key Largo sanctuaries thanks to boating, fishing, underwater diving, snorkeling, real estate development, groundings of ships and boats on coral reefs, and pollution. More coral bleaching events and other losses of living coral occurred, as well as algal blooms in Florida Bay and sponge, seagrass, long-spined urchin (genus Diadema), and coral reef fish die-offs. In June 1987, the United States Department of the Interior released a five-year plan to open Florida's coastal areas to offshore oil and gas development, with lease sales starting in late 1988.

Public concern over the environmental problems and the prospect of offshore drilling prompted the United States Congress in 1988 to both reauthorize the National Marine Sanctuary program and order NOAA to conduct a feasibility study of the possibility of expanding national marine sanctuary sites in the Florida Keys. Accordingly, in 1988 NOAA made Alligator Reef, Sombrero Key, and American Shoal official study areas for potential inclusion in national marine sanctuaries.

In 1989, public hearings took place on offshore drilling plans in the Florida Keys, further heightening concerns over the future environmental health of the area. Three major ship groundings in the Florida Keys over an 18-day period between October 25 and November 11, 1989, destroyed hundreds of acres (hectares) of coral reef, giving greater impetus to efforts to increase the protection of the area.

== Replacement by Florida Keys National Marine Sanctuary ==
In early 1990, the U.S. Congress passed the Florida Keys National Marine Sanctuary and Protection Act, legislatively creating a national marine sanctuary for the first time. On November 16, 1990, President George H. W. Bush signed legislation establishing the Florida Keys National Marine Sanctuary, which protected an area of 3,800 square miles (2,900 sq nmi; 9,800 km^{2}) in the waters of the Florida Keys. This new sanctuary subsumed both the Looe Key and the Key Largo national marine sanctuaries, which lay within its boundaries. The Looe Key sanctuary's superintendent, Billy Causey, left that position in 1990 and became the first superintendent of the Florida Keys National Marine Sanctuary in 1991.

The legislation establishing the Florida Keys National Marine Sanctuary specified that the Looe Key National Marine Sanctuary continue to administer waters previously under its jurisdiction until NOAA could publish a comprehensive management plan for the new sanctuary. The Looe Key National Marine Sanctuary therefore and had its own superintendent until 1997 and continued to carry out administrative functions until that year. NOAA published the comprehensive plan in January 1997. The management plan took effect on July 1, 1997, at which point the Looe Key sanctuary was disestablished, its headquarters were integrated into the headquarters of the Florida Keys National Marine Sanctuary, and the waters of the former Looe Key sanctuary were redesignated as the Looe Key Existing Management Area.

The Looe Key Existing Management Area contains the Looe Key Sanctuary Preservation Area and the Looe Key Special Use Research Only Area. The Looe Key Existing Management Area sometimes still is referred to informally as the "Looe Key National Marine Sanctuary".
