= List of shipwrecks in 1744 =

The List of shipwrecks in 1744 includes some ships sunk, wrecked or otherwise lost during 1744.

table of contents
1744
Jan	Feb	Mar	Apr
May	Jun	Jul	Aug
Sep	Oct	Nov	Dec
Unknown date

== January ==
=== 11 January ===
List of shipwrecks: 11 January 1744
Ship	State	Description
Duc de Chartres	France	The barque or brigantine was lost off Rio Grande, State of Brazil, in the early morning of 11 January. She was on a voyage from Cádiz, Spain, to Buenos Aires, Viceroyalty of Peru. On board were Jesuits, Spanish merchants and the newly appointed governor of Buenos Aires, Don José de Arce, with his luggage. Of the 161 passengers and crew members, 84 lost their lives, including the Governor.

=== Unknown date ===
List of shipwrecks: Unknown date in January 1744
Ship	State	Description
Colinie van Surinam	Dutch Republic	The ship was wrecked on the Goodwin Sands, Kent, Great Britain.

== February ==
=== 5 February ===
List of shipwrecks: 5 February 1744
Ship	State	Description
HMS Looe	(Kingdom of Great Britain) Royal Navy	War of Jenkins' Ear: The fifth rate ran aground on a reef, later to be known as Looe Key, off the coast of Spanish Florida. Her 276 crew survived. She was later set afire to prevent her capture by the Spanish

=== 8 February ===
List of shipwrecks: 8 February 1744
Ship	State	Description
Prinsesse Louise	Denmark	The Danish Asiatic Company-ship ran aground 1 mile south of Malé in the Maldives on outbound journey to the Malabar Coast. 19 survivors reached the Coromandel Coast and 5 of them returned to Copenhagen.

=== 11 February ===
List of shipwrecks: 11 February 1744
Ship	State	Description
HMS Anne Galley	Royal Navy	War of the Austrian Succession, Battle of Toulon: The fire ship was scuttled off Toulon, France, with the loss of all hands.

=== 22 February ===
List of shipwrecks: 22 February 1744
Ship	State	Description
HMS Anne Galley	(Kingdom of Great Britain) Royal Navy	HMS Anne Galley. War of the Austrian Succession, Battle of Toulon: The fireship was set afire by Hércules (Spanish Navy). She exploded and sank.
Poder	Spanish Navy	War of the Austrian Succession, Battle of Toulon: The fourth rate was scuttled following the battle due to damage sustained.

== April ==
=== Unknown date ===
List of shipwrecks: April 1744
Ship	State	Description
Two Brothers	Ireland	The ship was wrecked near Montserrat. She was on a voyage from Cork to Montserrat.

== July ==
=== 8 July ===
List of shipwrecks: 8 July 1744
Ship	State	Description
Somerset	Great Britain	The privateer, a snow, capsized and sank in the Bristol Channel. Eleven of the 97 people on board survived.

=== Unknown date ===
List of shipwrecks: July 1744
Ship	State	Description
Fortune	Great Britain	The ship foundered in the English Channel off Beachy Head, Sussex, before 10 July. Her captain was the only survivor. She was on a voyage from Portsmouth, Hampshire, to Rotterdam, South Holland, Dutch Republic.

== August ==
=== 17 August ===
List of shipwrecks: 17 August 1744
Ship	State	Description
Saint-Géran	France	The ship was wrecked off Réunion with the loss of 51 of the 60 people on board. She was on a voyage from Lorient to Réunion.

=== 29 August ===
List of shipwrecks: 29 August 1744
Ship	State	Description
Happy	Great Britain	The ship was driven ashore in Lough Swilly, Ireland. She was on a voyage from Barbados to Lancaster, Lancashire.
Indian Queen	Great Britain	The ship was driven ashore in Lough Swilly. She was on a voyage from Barbados to Lancaster.

=== Unknown date ===
List of shipwrecks: August 1744
Ship	State	Description
Barbadoes Packet	Great Britain	The ship was lost near Holyhead, Anglesey. She was on a voyage from Hale to Liverpool, Lancashire.
Curton	Great Britain	The galley was driven ashore and wrecked near Rye, Sussex, before 31 August. She was on a voyage from London to Jamaica.
Duke	Great Britain	The ship was wrecked on the Goodwin Sands, Kent, before 21 August. She was on a voyage from Jamaica to London.
Olonets (Олонец)	Imperial Russian Navy	The galiot ran aground at the skerries 4 nautical miles (7.4 km) off Stockholm, Sweden and sank. She was on a voyage from Kronstadt to Stockholm.

== September ==
=== 5 September ===
List of shipwrecks: 5 September 1744
Ship	State	Description
Amoretta	Great Britain	The ship foundered in the Bristol Channel off Biddiford, Devon. She was on a voyage from Virginia, British America, to Bristol, Gloucestershire.

=== 16 September ===
List of shipwrecks: 16 September 1744
Ship	State	Description
Jamaica Merchant	Great Britain	The ship foundered in Tory Bay, County Donegal, Ireland, with the loss of all but her captain. She was on a voyage from Barbados to Liverpool, Lancashire.

=== Unknown date ===
List of shipwrecks: September 1744
Ship	State	Description
Benjamin	Great Britain	The ship was driven ashore at Spurn Point, Yorkshire, before 28 September. She was on a voyage from Newcastle upon Tyne, Northumberland, to London.
Gertrude	Hamburg	The ship was driven ashore in Westport, County Mayo, Ireland, before 18 September. She was on a voyage from Hamburg to Venice.
John	Great Britain	The ship was driven ashore near Gottenburg, Sweden, before 18 September. She was on a voyage from London to Gottenburg
Kitty	Great Britain	The ship was driven ashore and wrecked near Gottenburg before 18 September. She was on a voyage from London to Gottenburg.
Prosperous	Great Britain	The ship ran aground off Weymouth, Dorset, before 25 September and was severely damaged. She was on a voyage from Chichester, Sussex, to Falmouth, Cornwall.
St John	Great Britain	The ship was driven ashore on the coast of Portugal by a Spanish privateer. She was on a voyage from London to Porto, Portugal,

== October ==
=== 5 October ===
List of shipwrecks: 5 October 1744
Ship	State	Description
HMS Victory	(Kingdom of Great Britain) Royal Navy	HMS Victory. The first rate ship of the line foundered between the Channel Islands and the French coast (49°52′30″N 3°33′18″W) with the loss of her crew of about 1,100 men.

=== 21 October ===
List of shipwrecks: 21 October 1744
Ship	State	Description
HMS Colchester	(Kingdom of Great Britain) Royal Navy	The fourth rate ship of the line ran aground on the Kentish Knock, in the North Sea and was scuttled. There were about 40 casualties from her crew of about 400.

=== 26 October ===
List of shipwrecks: 26 October 1744
Ship	State	Description
Wackender Boeye	Dutch Republic	The ship was lost on the Goodwin Sands, Kent, Great Britain. She was on a voyage from Zierikzee to Saint-Valery-sur-Somme, Somme, France.
Unidentified	Dutch Republic	The dogger was wrecked on the Goodwin Sands.

=== Unknown date ===
List of shipwrecks: October 1744
Ship	State	Description
Endeavour	Great Britain	The ship was driven ashore near King's Lynn, Norfolk, before 16 October. She was on a voyage from Sunderland, County Durham, to King's Lynn.
Kingston	Great Britain	The ship foundered in the North Sea off Berwick upon Tweed, Northumberland, before 5 October.
New Foster	Great Britain	The ship was lost on the coast of the Isle of Man. She was on a voyage from Liverpool, Lancashire, to an African port.

== November ==
=== Unknown date ===
List of shipwrecks: November 1744
Ship	State	Description
Robert and John	Great Britain	The ship was driven ashore at Liverpool, Lancashire, before 13 November. She was on a voyage from Virginia, British America, to Liverpool.

== December ==
=== 3 December ===
List of shipwrecks: 3 December 1744
Ship	State	Description
Polly	Great Britain	The ship was driven ashore and wrecked near Walmer Castle, Kent. She was on a voyage from London to Cork, Ireland, and the Leeward Islands.

=== 19 December ===
List of shipwrecks: 19 December 1744
Ship	State	Description
Prospect	Great Britain	The ship was driven ashore near Saint-Malo, Ille-et-Vilaine, France with the loss of most of her crew.

=== 24 December ===
List of shipwrecks: 24 December 1744
Ship	State	Description
HMS Swallow	Royal Navy	The 10-gun sloop ran aground and was wrecked on the Bahama Banks near the Abaco Islands while attempting to reach New Providence.

=== Unknown date ===
List of shipwrecks: December 1744
Ship	State	Description
Chatham	Great Britain	The ship was driven ashore and wrecked on the coast of Sussex before 28 December. She was on a voyage from Piscataway, Maryland, British America, to London.
Eaton	Great Britain	The frigate was driven ashore in the River Thames before 14 December. She was on a voyage from London to Livorno, Grand Duchy of Tuscany.
Elizabeth	Great Britain	The ship foundered in The Downs before 18 December. She was on a voyage from Stockholm, Sweden, to Portsmouth, Hampshire.
Elizabeth	Great Britain	The ship foundered in The Downs before 21 December. Her crew were rescued. She was on a voyage from London to Gibraltar.
Endeavour	Great Britain	The ship was driven ashore in the River Thames before 14 December, She was on a voyage from Jamaica to London.
James	Great Britain	The ship was lost on the Spaniard Sandbank, in the Thames Estuary before 14 December. She was on a voyage from Jamaica to London.
Martha	Great Britain	The ship was driven ashore on the French coast before 25 December.
Providence	Hamburg	The ship was driven ashore at Margate, Kent, Great Britain, before 18 December.
Ranger	Great Britain	The ship foundered in the English Channel before 18 December with the loss of a crew member. She was on a voyage from Newfoundland, British America, to Poole, Dorset.
Sally	Great Britain	The ship foundered in the English Channel before 7 December. She was on a voyage from Chichester, Sussex, to Porto, Portugal.

== Unknown date ==
List of shipwrecks: 1744
Ship	State	Description
Bolsheretsk (Большерецк)	Imperial Russian Navy	The sloop-of-war was driven ashore near the mouth of the Bolshaya river. Her crew were rescued.
Cape Fare Merchant	Great Britain	The ship was lost off Antigua before 5 October. She was on a voyage from Bristol, Gloucestershire, to Antigua.
Charming Molly	Great Britain	The ship foundered three days into a voyage from Saint Kitts to London. Her crew were rescued by HMS Otter ( (Kingdom of Great Britain) Royal Navy).
Charming Molly	Great Britain	The ship was lost near Helsingfors, Finland, before 16 November. She was on a voyage from Saint Petersburg, Russia, to London.
Friendship	Great Britain	The ship was lost off Bermuda before 20 November. She was on a voyage from Saint Kitts to Barbados.
Hare	Great Britain	The ship was lost off a port in South Carolina, British America, before 22 June. She was bound for London.
Katherine & Elizabeth	Great Britain	The ship was lost on the coast of Carolina, British America, before 25 May. She was on a voyage from Carolina to London.
Neptune	Great Britain	The ship was lost on a sandbank before 29 May. She was on a voyage from North Carolina, British America, to London.
Norris	Great Britain	The ship sprang a leak and foundered south of Jamaica before 28 December. She was on a voyage from Jamaica to London.
Northampton	British East India Company	The ship was last sighted 50 leagues (150 nautical miles (280 km)) west of Île Bourbon sometime after 20 July. No further trace, presumed foundered with the loss of all hands.
Providence	Great Britain	The ship was driven ashore near Helsingfors, Finland, before 26 October.
Tartar	(Kingdom of Great Britain) British America	The privateer capsized off the Virginia Capes before 24 August with the loss of most of her crew.
