= Key Largo National Marine Sanctuary =

Former aquatic protected area in the Florida Keys

- IUCN category V (protected landscape/seascape)
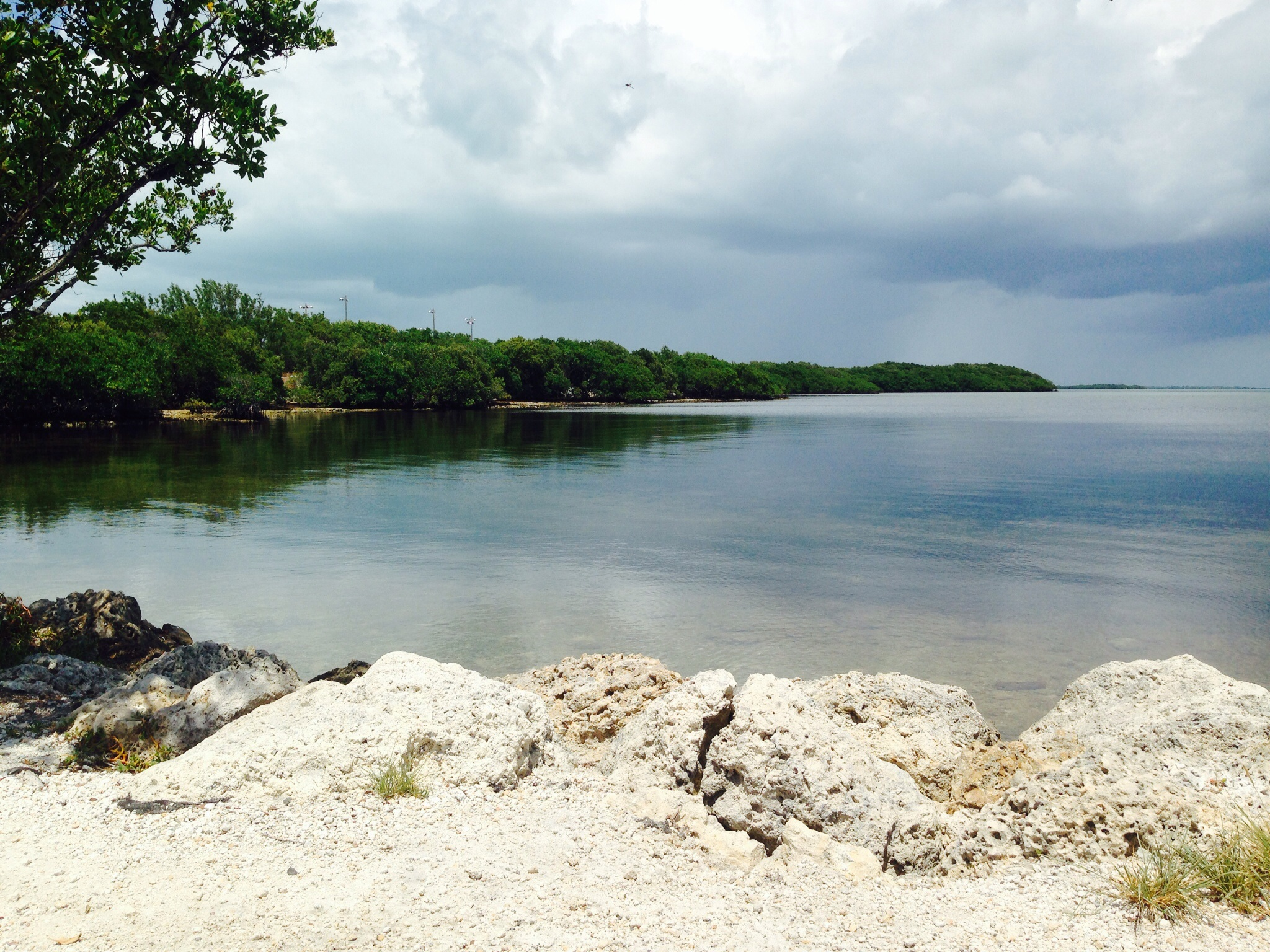
- Key Largo

- Location within Florida Location within the United States
- Location: Key Largo area of the Florida Keys
- Coordinates: 25.0865°N 80.4473°W
- Area: 103 sq mi (270 km^{2})
- Designated: December 18, 1975; 50 years ago
- Disestablished: November 16, 1990; 35 years ago (subsumed; see text); July 1, 1997; 29 years ago (integrated; see text)
- Governing body: NOAA Office of National Marine Sanctuaries

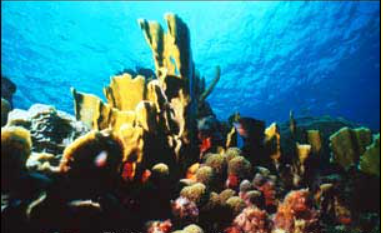
A coral spur on Molasses Reef.

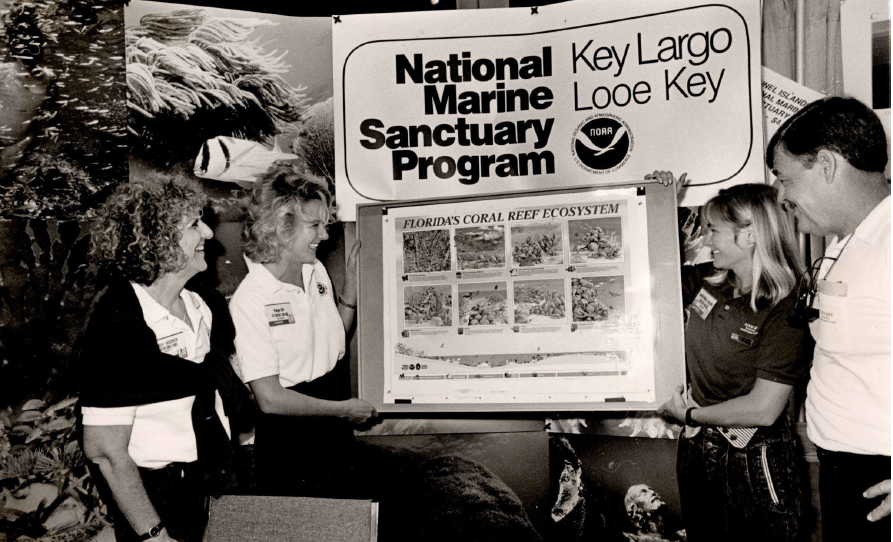
Staff members pose with a poster for the Key Largo and Looe Key national marine sanctuaries in the 1980s.

The Key Largo National Marine Sanctuary was a National Marine Sanctuary in the waters in the Florida Keys in Florida in the United States that existed from 1975 to 1990. It was the second national marine sanctuary, and it protected the portion of a barrier reef beyond Florida state waters in John Pennekamp Coral Reef State Park. In 1990, it was subsumed by the new Florida Keys National Marine Sanctuary, which included its waters. However, it continued to operate until 1997, when it was fully integrated into the Florida Keys sanctuary.

== Description ==
The Key Largo National Marine Sanctuary covered an area of 103 square miles (78 sq nmi; 270 km^{2}) adjacent to and east of John Pennekamp Coral Reef State Park and was created to protect a portion of a coral barrier reef which lay outside the waters of that park. The sanctuary's waters stretched from Carysfort Reef Light on Carysfort Reef southwestward to Molasses Reef, a distance of 15.2 nautical miles (17.5 mi; 28.2 km).

The sanctuary's western boundary was the eastern boundary of John Pennekamp Coral Reef State Park. Its northern boundary ran from the state park's northeastern corner at 25°19.45′N 080°12.0′W southeastward to a point on the 300-foot (91 m) isobath at 25°6.2′N 080°08.7′W. From there, the western boundary ran southwestward to another point on the 300-foot (91 m) isobath at 24°58.3′N 080°19.8′W. Finally, its southern boundary ran northwestward from that point to the southeastern corner of the state park at 25°02.2′N 080°25.25′W.

== Fauna ==
The waters off Key Largo include stands of elkhorn corals and large mounds of star corals (genus Astreopora) and brain corals.

== Christ of the Deep ==
The 9-foot (2.7 m) tall statue Christ of the Deep, placed in less than 25 feet (7.6 m) of water in a sand channel on the offshore side of the Dry Rocks reef on August 25, 1965, in what at that time was part of John Pennekamp Coral Reef State Park, was included in the Key Largo National Marine Sanctuary.

== History ==
Between the late 1950s and the mid-1970s, concerns grew over the need to protect and preserve the Florida Reef — the coral reefs of the Florida Keys — from damage in the face of the burgeoning tourism industry in the region, leading to the creation of Florida's John Pennekamp Coral Reef State Park off Key Largo in 1960 as the first underwater park in the United States. In 1974, the limit of Florida's state territorial waters changed to 3 nautical miles (5.6 km; 3.5 mi) offshore, shrinking the area of the state park and leaving portions of the reef formerly under the park's jurisdiction that lay beyond that limit unprotected.

In 1974, Dr. Dennis O'Connor of the University of Miami and Dr. Rezneat Darnell of the American Institute of Biological Science nominated the area left unprotected by the boundary change for consideration as a national marine sanctuary. In August 1975, the National Oceanic and Atmospheric Administration (NOAA) released a draft plan that proposed establishing a national marine sanctuary in U.S. waters adjacent to John Pennekamp Coral Reef State Park. NOAA proposed that the State of Florida manage the sanctuary under an agreement with NOAA. A public review period and a public hearing followed, both yielding mostly positive suggestions and support. As a result, NOAA issued a final management plan in December 1975 for the Key Largo National Marine Sanctuary. The designation ceremony took place on December 18, 1975, aboard a glass-bottom boat over the reef, attended by NOAA Administrator Dr. Robert White, members of the United States Congress, and officials representing the Government of Florida.

In 1980, NOAA entered into a cooperative agreement with the Florida Department of National Resources (which later became part of the Florida Department of Environmental Protection) under which Florida state employees operated the Key Largo National Marine Sanctuary with the United States Government fully funding their salaries. During the 1980s, the Key Largo National Marine Sanctuary and Looe Key National Marine Sanctuary became models for managing marine protected areas, both within the United States and internationally.

In 1981, the staff of the Key Largo National Marine Sanctuary pioneered the concept of a mooring buoy system to protect underwater features such as coral reefs, seagrass beds, and maritime archaeological site from anchor damage by making anchoring unnecessary. The staff installed the world's first such system in the sanctuary at the often-visited French Reef that year.

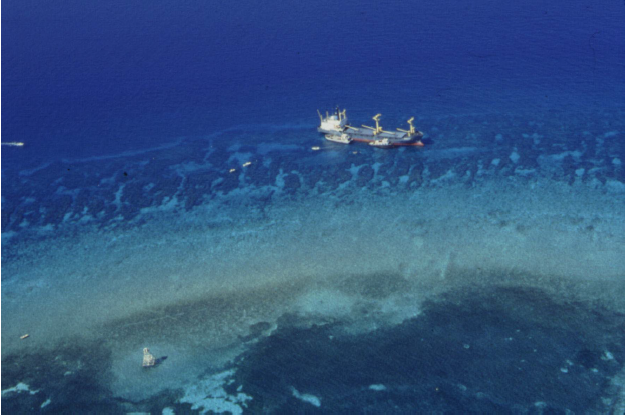
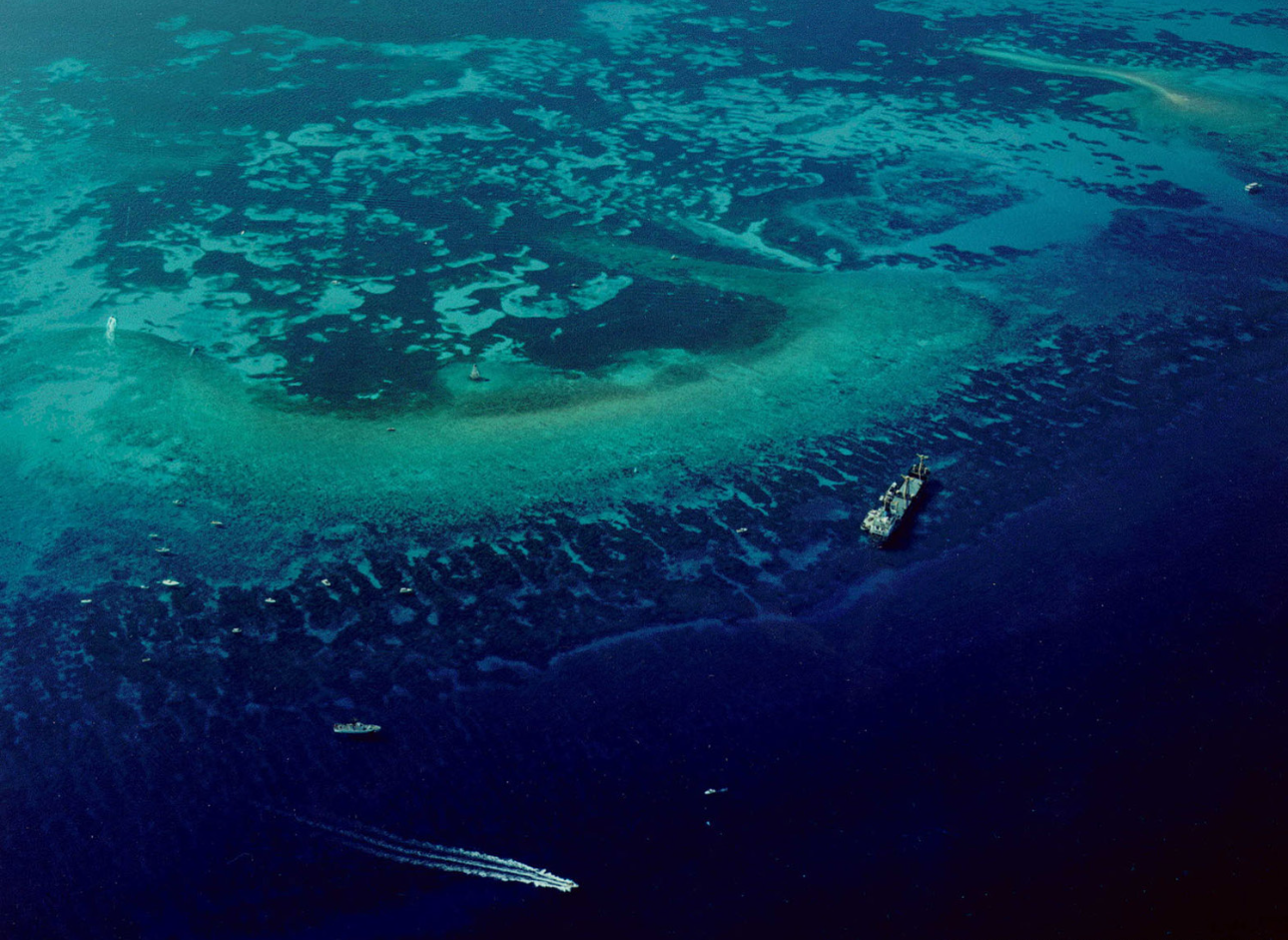
The motor vessel Wellwood aground on Molasses Reef in 1984.
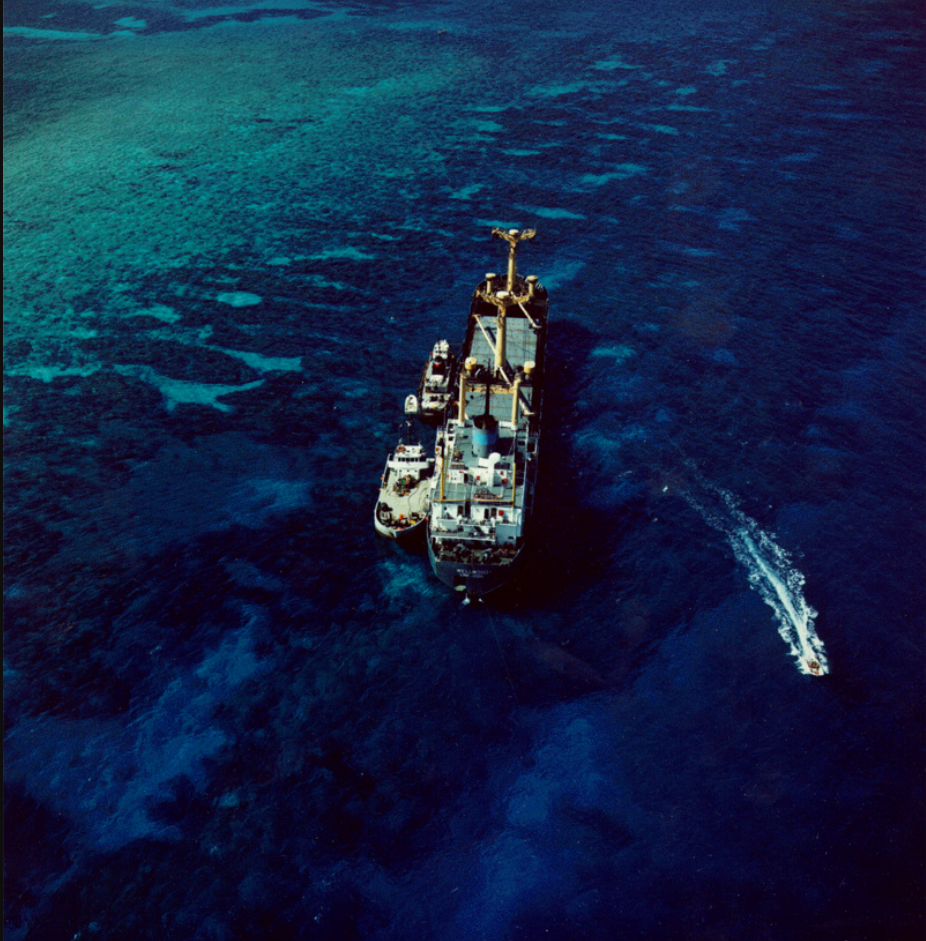
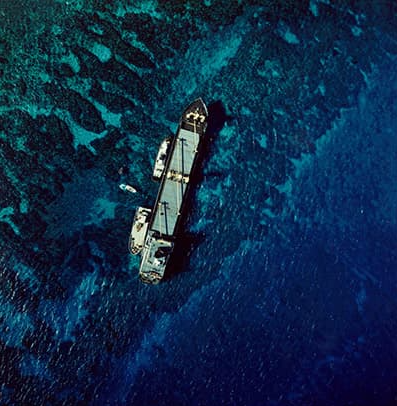
Tugs assist Wellwood in August 1984.

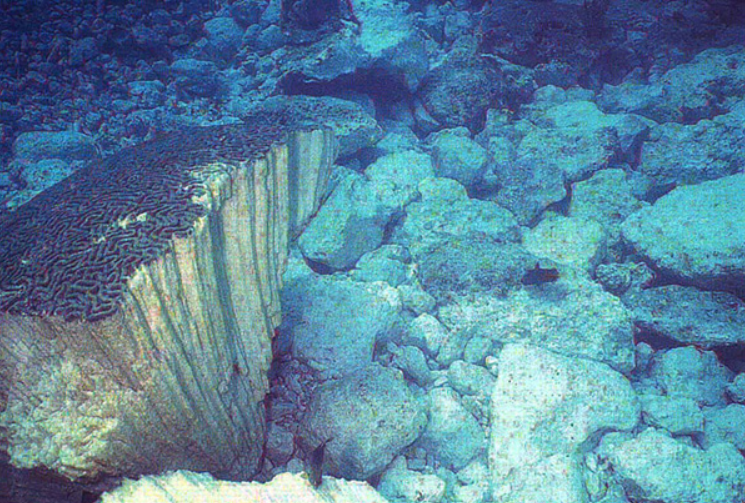
Damaged brain coral and rubble on Molasses Reef after the Wellwood grounding.

On August 4, 1984, the 122-metre (400 ft) Cypriot-flagged motor cargo vessel MV Wellwood ran aground in 6 metres (20 ft) of water on Molasses Reef within the Key Largo National Marine Sanctuary. The grounding inflicted significant damage on the reef. As Wellwood approached the reef, she created a grounding track 20 metres (66 ft) wide that removed one of the sanctuary's mooring buoys and damaged bottom substrate up to 6 metres (20 ft) deep, knocking over or otherwise damaging 13 coral heads and leaving her bottom paint embedded in exposed coral skeletons. The ship destroyed nearly all of the coral cover in the area in which she came to rest, including at least six large colonies of boulder brain coral. Staff from both the Key Largo and Looe Key sanctuaries responded as soon as the incident was reported and remained on the scene while a United States Coast Guard-led effort sought to refloat Wellwood and remove her from the reef. Early in the recovery effort Wellwood pivoted into a new resting spot, where she shaded the reef from sunlight and her hull continuously scraped against the coral, flattening the reef and cracking its framework structure. Salvors finally refloated and removed Wellwood after 12 days on the reef, and NOAA biologists found that few corals survived the grounding. Overall, the incident destroyed 5,805 square metres (62,500 sq ft) of living coral on Molasses Reef and damaged 75,000 square metres (807,000 sq ft) of reef habitat, with widespread mortality of benthic organisms and the displacement of mobile fauna, prompting NOAA to begin a multi-year reef restoration project.

In 1986, the Key Largo National Marine Sanctuary teamed up with the Looe Key National Marine Sanctuary to hold a joint underwater photography contest. In the 1980s, NOAA worked with the Miami Herald to produce an article on the high rate of boat groundings in the two sanctuaries and with United Press International to produce a feature article on the impact of underwater diving on coral reefs. Both articles were part of an effort to draw the public's attention to the detrimental effect of human activities on the reef systems in the Florida Keys.

The first large-scale coral bleaching event in the lower Florida Keys was recorded in 1979, and during the 1980s water quality and other environmental conditions in the Florida Keys continued to decline despite the designation of the Looe Key and Key Largo sanctuaries thanks to boating, fishing, underwater diving, snorkeling, real estate development, groundings of ships and boats on coral reefs, and pollution. More coral bleaching events and other losses of living coral occurred, as well as algal blooms in Florida Bay and sponge, seagrass, long-spined urchin (genus Diadema), and coral reef fish die-offs. In June 1987, the United States Department of the Interior released a five-year plan to open Florida's coastal areas to offshore oil and gas development, with lease sales starting in late 1988.

Public concern over the environmental problems and the prospect of offshore drilling prompted the United States Congress in 1988 to both reauthorize the National Marine Sanctuary program and order NOAA to conduct a feasibility study of the possibility of expanding national marine sanctuary sites in the Florida Keys. Accordingly, in 1988 NOAA made Alligator Reef, Sombrero Key, and American Shoal official study areas for potential inclusion in national marine sanctuaries.

In 1989, public hearings took place on offshore drilling plans in the Florida Keys, further heightening concerns over the future environmental health of the area. Three major ship groundings in the Florida Keys over an 18-day period between October 25 and November 11, 1989, destroyed hundreds of acres (hectares) of coral reef, giving greater impetus to efforts to increase the protection of the area. Two of the groundings — of MV Alec Owen Maitland on October 25 and of MV Elpis on November 11 — took place within the Key Largo National Marine Sanctuary, whose biologists determined that few reef organisms at the sites of the groundings survived the incidents.

== Replacement by Florida Keys National Marine Sanctuary ==
In early 1990, the U.S. Congress passed the Florida Keys National Marine Sanctuary and Protection Act, creating a national marine sanctuary directly through legislation for the first time. On November 16, 1990, President George H. W. Bush signed legislation establishing the Florida Keys National Marine Sanctuary, which protected an area of 3,800 square miles (2,900 sq nmi; 9,800 km^{2}) in the waters of the Florida Keys. This new sanctuary subsumed both the Key Largo and Looe Key national marine sanctuaries, which lay within its boundaries.

The legislation establishing the Florida Keys National Marine Sanctuary specified that the Key Largo National Marine Sanctuary continue to administer waters previously under its jurisdiction until NOAA could publish a comprehensive management plan for the new sanctuary. The Key Largo National Marine Sanctuary therefore and had its own superintendent until 1993 and continued to carry out administrative functions until 1997. NOAA published the comprehensive plan in January 1997. The management plan took effect on July 1, 1997, at which point the Key Largo sanctuary was disestablished, its headquarters were integrated into the headquarters of the Florida Keys National Marine Sanctuary, and the waters of the former Key Largo sanctuary were redesignated as the Key Largo Existing Management Area. The Florida Keys National Marine Sanctuary also increased in size in 1997, and the waters of the Key Largo Existing Management Area — which include the Key Largo Dry Rocks Sanctuary Preservation Area — were rezoned with an area of 146.77 square miles (110.83 sq nmi; 380.1 km^{2}).
