= National Marine Sanctuary =

Zone in US waters designated for special protection

Office of National Marine Sanctuaries

Agency overview
- Formed: October 23, 1972; 53 years ago
- Jurisdiction: United States federal government
- Headquarters: 1305 East-West Highway, Silver Spring, MD 20910
- Employees: 350
- Annual budget: $50 million (2016)
- Agency executive: John Armor, Director of The Office of National Marine Sanctuaries
- Parent agency: National Oceanic and Atmospheric Administration
- Website: sanctuaries.noaa.gov

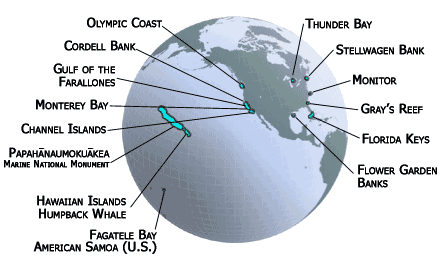
Global view of National Marine Sanctuaries extant in 2008.

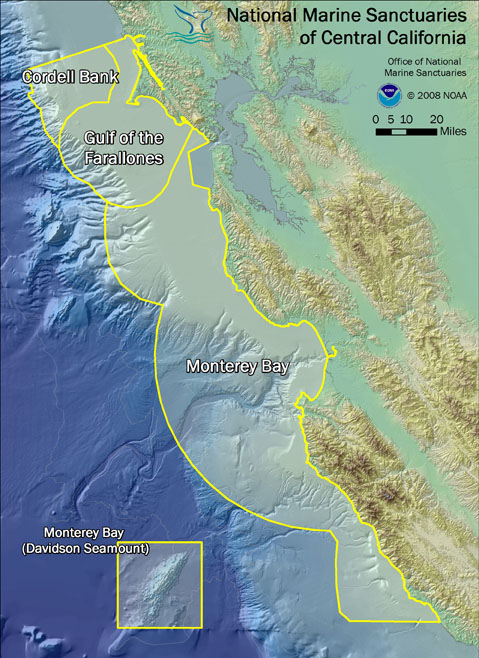
Undated diagram from 2013 or earlier illustrating the orientation of the then-three marine sanctuaries of Central California: Cordell Bank, Gulf of the Farallones, and Monterey Bay. In October 2024, a fourth sanctuary, Chumash Heritage, was created.

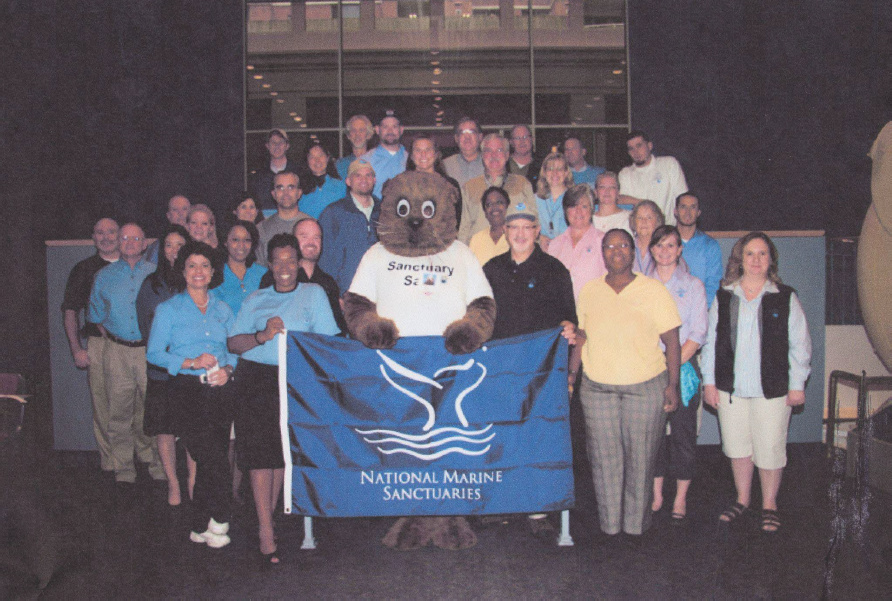
The Office of National Marine Sanctuaries headquarters staff poses in 2008 with the office's flag and the sanctuary system mascot, Sanctuary Sam.

A U.S. National Marine Sanctuary is a federally designated area within United States waters that protects areas of the marine environment with special conservation, recreational, ecological, historical, cultural, archeological, scientific, educational, or aesthetic qualities. The program was established in 1972 by the Marine Protection, Research, and Sanctuaries Act and is currently administered by the National Ocean Service through the National Marine Sanctuaries Act (NMSA).

While National Marine Sanctuaries are multiple-use areas, the NMSA emphasizes that one of the express purposes of a sanctuary is to "maintain the natural biological communities" and to "protect and, where appropriate, restore and enhance natural habitats, populations, and ecological processes." The National Marine Sanctuary System consists of 18 marine protected areas that encompass about 785,000 square miles (2,030,000 km^{2}). Individual areas range from less than 1 to 583,000 square miles (3 to 1,509,963 km^{2}).

The Office of National Marine Sanctuaries (ONMS), a division of the National Oceanic and Atmospheric Administration (NOAA), administers the 17 national marine sanctuaries. The program began after the 1969 Santa Barbara oil spill off the coast of California brought the plight of marine ecosystems to national attention. The United States Congress responded in 1972 with the Marine Protection, Research and Sanctuaries Act which allowed for the creation of marine sanctuaries. The resources protected by U.S. national marine sanctuaries range from coral reef ecosystems in American Samoa, Florida, Hawaii, and Texas, to shipwrecks in the Great Lakes and the Atlantic Ocean.

The NMSP also is involved in the administration of the Papahānaumokuākea Marine National Monument and the Rose Atoll Marine National Monument, although they are not U.S. national marine sanctuaries. The NMSP jointly administers the Papahānaumokuākea Marine National Monument in conjunction with the United States Fish and Wildlife Service and the State of Hawaii, and it jointly administers the Rose Atoll Marine National Monument with the U.S. Fish and Wildlife Service.

== Scope of protection ==
Designation as a National Marine Sanctuary does not automatically prohibit fishing and other activities. Recreational and commercial fishing is allowed in some sanctuaries. It is possible to restrict consumptive or destructive activities through the initial designation process and NMSP actions. There are restrictions in some sanctuaries that are enforced by other governing agencies. For example, current regulations restricting fishing in Stellwagen Bank were not issued by the NMSP, but rather by National Marine Fisheries Service (NOAA Fisheries) and the New England Fishery Management Council, which have jurisdiction in federal waters off the New England coast generally. The private nonprofit organization Marine Conservation Institute has compiled fact sheets for each sanctuary listing activities which are directly regulated by the NMSP.

== Designating sanctuary sites ==
Site selection is done under the auspices of the National Oceanic and Atmospheric Administration (NOAA). Regional teams of marine scientists identify geographically representative sites for potential marine sanctuaries. NOAA then selects candidate sites and meets with state or territorial resource managers and/or the state or territorial governor's staff to determine the local level of interest in establishing a sanctuary. If there is mutually satisfactory interest, the candidate sites are evaluated through a process of public and legislative review and validated by the United States Congress and state or territorial governments. NOAA initiates the designation by the preparation of a Draft Environmental Impact Statement (DEIS) and a proposed management plan, then publishes a notice of its plans in the Federal Register. NOAA sponsors regional meetings and public hearings to gather comments. The U.S. Congress receives the draft statements and may conduct its own hearings. NOAA prepares a Final Environmental Impact Statement (FEIS) that addresses the concerns raised in the DEIS process and distributes it for comment. Finally, upon approval of the President of the United States, the United States Secretary of Commerce, who oversees NOAA, designates the area as a National Marine Sanctuary. The U.S. Congress and the governor of the state or territory then may formally object to or appeal the designation.

== List of U.S. National Marine Sanctuaries ==
=== Existing sancturies ===
Name	Location	Area	Designated
National Marine Sanctuary of American Samoa	Pacific	13,581 sq mi (35,175 km^{2})	April 29, 1986
Channel Islands National Marine Sanctuary	Pacific	1,470 sq mi (3,807 km^{2})	October 2, 1980
Chumash Heritage National Marine Sanctuary	Pacific	4,543 sq mi (11,766 km^{2})	October 11, 2024
Cordell Bank National Marine Sanctuary	Pacific	1,286 sq mi (3,331 km^{2})	May 24, 1989
Florida Keys National Marine Sanctuary	Atlantic, Gulf of Mexico	3,840 sq mi (9,946 km^{2})	November 16, 1990
Flower Garden Banks National Marine Sanctuary	Gulf of Mexico	160 sq mi (414 km^{2})	January 17, 1992
Gray's Reef National Marine Sanctuary	Atlantic	22 sq mi (57 km^{2})	January 16, 1981
Greater Farallones National Marine Sanctuary	Pacific	3,295 sq mi (8,534 km^{2})	January 16, 1981
Hawaiian Islands Humpback Whale National Marine Sanctuary	Pacific	1,400 sq mi (3,626 km^{2})	November 14, 1992
Lake Ontario National Marine Sanctuary	Great Lakes	1,722 sq mi (4,460 km^{2})	September 6, 2024
Mallows Bay–Potomac River National Marine Sanctuary	Potomac River	18 sq mi (47 km^{2})	September 3, 2019
Monitor National Marine Sanctuary	Atlantic	0.785 sq mi (2.03 km^{2})	February 5, 1975
Monterey Bay National Marine Sanctuary	Pacific	6,094 sq mi (15,780 km^{2})	September 18, 1992
Olympic Coast National Marine Sanctuary	Pacific	3,189 sq mi (8,260 km^{2})	May 11, 1994
Papahānaumokuākea National Marine Sanctuary	Pacific	582,578 sq mi (1,508,870 km^{2})	January 16, 2025
Stellwagen Bank National Marine Sanctuary	Atlantic	842 sq mi (2,180 km^{2})	November 14, 1992
Thunder Bay National Marine Sanctuary	Great Lakes	4,300 sq mi (11,137 km^{2})	June 22, 2000
Wisconsin Shipwreck Coast National Marine Sanctuary	Great Lakes	726 sq mi (1,880 km^{2})	October 9, 2021

NOTES: (1) The National Marine Sanctuary of American Samoa originally was named the Fagatelle Bay National Marine Sanctuary.
(2) The Greater Farallones National Marine Sanctuary originally was named the Gulf of the Farallones National Marine Sanctuary.

=== Former sanctuaries ===
Name	Location	Area	Designated
Key Largo National Marine Sanctuary	Atlantic	103 sq mi (267 km^{2})	December 18, 1975
Looe Key National Marine Sanctuary	Atlantic	7.04 sq mi (18.2 km^{2})	January 16, 1981

NOTE: These sanctuaries were subsumed by the Florida Keys National Marine Sanctuary on November 16, 1990, but continued to operate until July 1, 1997, when they were integrated into the Florida Keys sanctuary and redesignated as Existing Management Areas.

=== In designation process ===
- Lake Erie National Marine Sanctuary
- Hudson Canyon National Marine Sanctuary
- Pacific Remote Islands National Marine Sanctuary (presently the Pacific Islands Heritage Marine National Monument)

== Notes ==
=== Bibliography ===
- Moore, Elizabeth (2022). Time and Tide: A History of the National Maritime Sanctuary System. Washington, D.C.: National Oceanic and Atmospheric Administration Office of National Marine Sanctuaries.
