= Fringing reef =

Type of coral reef

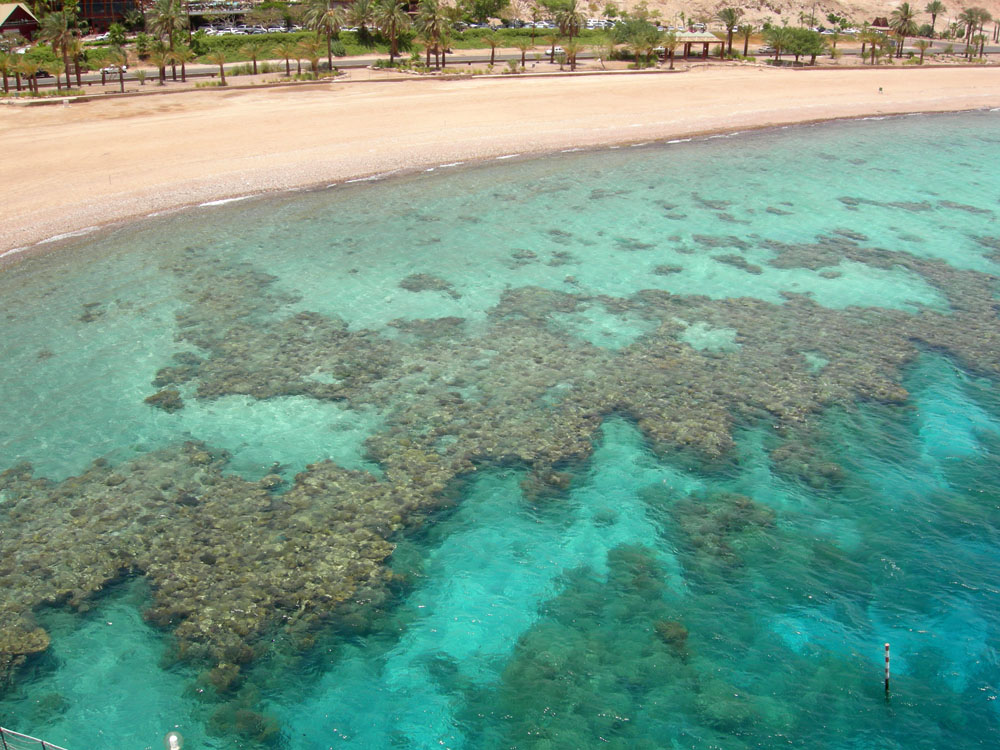
A fringing reef off the coast of Eilat, Israel

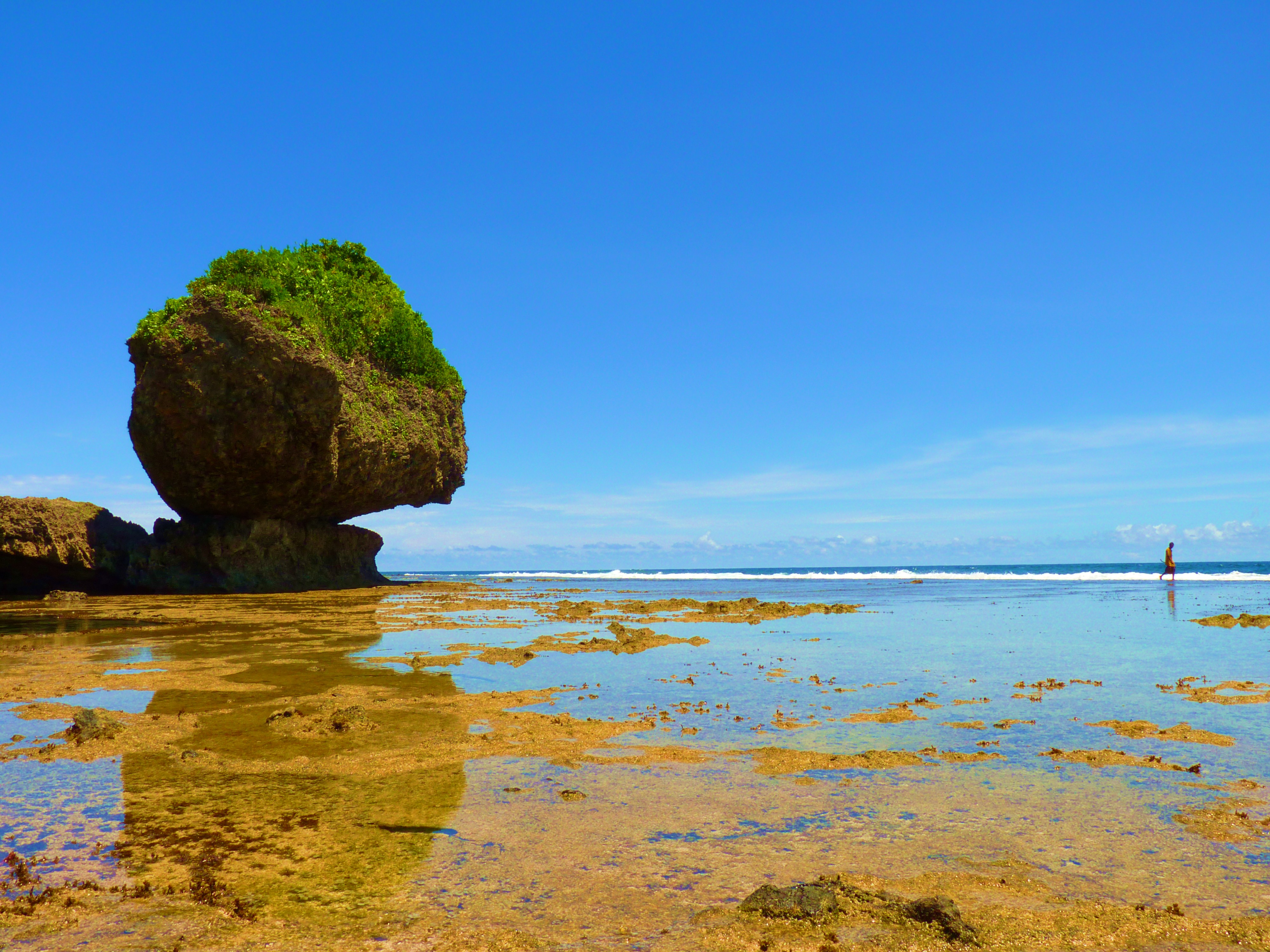
Exposed reef flats during low tide at the Magpupungko Rock Pools in Siargao Island, Philippines

A fringing reef is one of the three main types of coral reef. It is distinguished from the other two, barrier reefs and atolls, by having either an entirely shallow back reef zone (lagoon) or none at all. Unlike fringing reefs, barrier reefs feature deeper sections within the lagoon. Additionally, barrier reefs are typically located much further away from the coastline. If a fringing reef grows directly from the shoreline, the reef flat extends to the beach and there is no back reef. In other cases, such as most of the Bahamas, fringing reefs may grow hundreds of meters from the shore, enclosing extensive back reef areas. These enclosed sections can provide food and shelter for marine organisms. Fringing reefs are found in many regions, including the Philippines, Indonesia, Timor-Leste, the western coast of Australia, the Caribbean, East Africa, and Red Sea. The largest fringing coral reef in the world is the Ningaloo Reef, stretching to about 260 km (160 mi) along the coastline of Western Australia.

== Structure ==
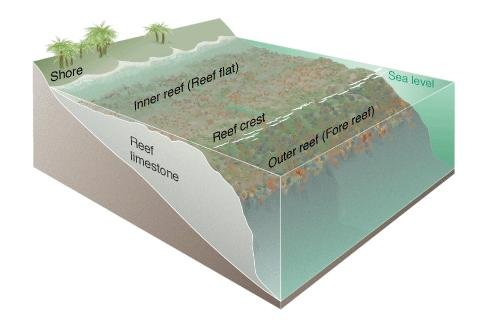
Diagram of a fringing coral reef

The two main components that make up a fringing reef are the reef flat and the reef slope.

=== Reef flat (back reef) ===
The reef flat is the shoreward, flat, and broadest area of the reef. The reef flat is found in fairly shallow water and can breach sea-level during low tide. This area of the reef is only slightly sloped towards the open ocean. Since the reef flat is adjacent or nearly adjacent to land, it sustains the most damage from runoff, sediments, and anthropogenic activities. Typically, few of the flat's corals are alive. Seagrasses, seaweeds, and soft corals are often found in this reef zone.

=== Reef slope (fore reef) ===
The reef slope is positioned at the outer edge of the fringing reef, bordering the open ocean. Usually characterized by a steep inclination, this part of the reef either descends to a relatively shallow sandy base or extends to depths too significant to facilitate coral growth. Due to the fewer occurrences of runoff and sediment deposition on outer reef slope, there is a higher abundance of coral and a broader variety of coral species. Greater wave action disperses pollutants while transporting nutrients to this specific area.

Wave energy is a primary controller of fringing reef morphology. The fore reef provides a buffer zone that can absorb strong wave energy forces that protect the shoreline from erosion. A common characteristic found on the fore reef involves the creation of spur-and-groove formations, which facilitate the downslope transportation of sediment within the grooves. High energy environments maintain a relatively consistent spur-and-groove structure, while low energy environments exhibit greater variation, with larger and broader formations developing in deep water.

The upper segment of the reef slope is known as the reef crest. The crest offers an optimal balance of sunlight exposure and wave action, fostering the fastest coral growth. Conversely, the base of the slope receives the least amount of sunlight and consequently exhibits the slowest growth among all sections of the slope.

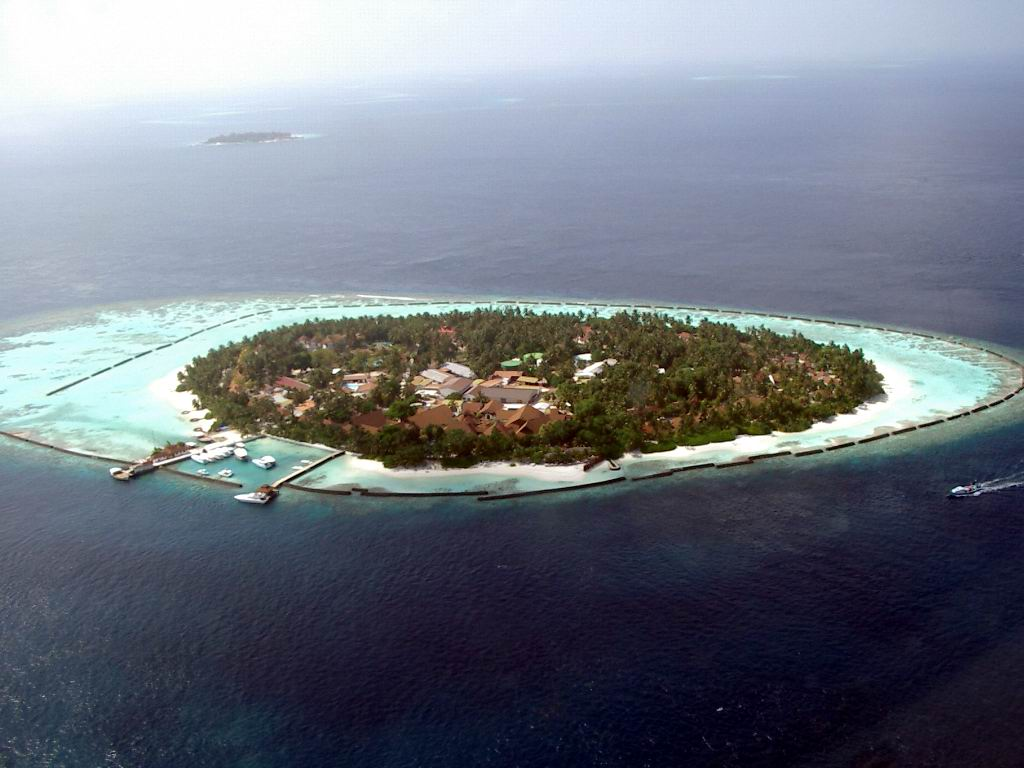
Island with fringing reef in the Maldives

== Development ==
The most important determinant of reef growth is available space as determined by sea level changes. Sea level changes are mostly a result of glaciation or plate tectonics. Tectonic activity can impact the survival of fringing reefs. An earthquake on Ranongga in the Solomon Islands moved 80% of its fringing reef permanently above sea level. Northern Ranongga reefs became elevated 1m above the high water mark (HWM), whereas the south side reefs moved 2 to 3m above the high water height.

Most fringing reefs follow the keep-up, catch-up, or give-up growth pattern. Keep-up reefs grow at the same rate that sea level rises. Catch-up reefs initially grow slower than sea level rises, but eventually catch up when the rise in sea level slows or stops. Alternatively, give-up reefs are not able to grow fast enough and are "drowned out".

There are six different ways in which fringing reefs grow and develop.

- Reefs can develop vertically as far as the space below the surface allows. Once the reef crest reaches sea level, the reef may begin growing seaward. As sea levels rise, previously exposed reef surfaces become submerged and coral growth resumes, often growing on dead coral. The reef flat's age indicates when the reef reached sea level. Catch-up reefs have younger surfaces than keep-up reefs of this type.
- Reefs can expand seaward from the shore. This requires a fairly constant sea level. If the sea level drops, the reef flat in more seaward areas slopes downward.
- Reefs can grow atop muddy sediments which can predate the reef or accumulate along with the reef's growth. These reefs also grow seaward from the shore. Older sediments are closest to shore and are not buried. Coral, seagrass, and algae filter sediment before it is placed on the reef crest.
- Reefs can form in a gradual, sporadic manner, with alternate vertical and horizontal growth episodes. In this type of fringing reef formation there are multiple separate reefs that are found parallel to the shore and the original fringing reef. These reefs become one large reef when sediments fill in the spaces between the corals.
- Reefs can develop when an offshore reef grows to sea level, forming a barrier. When the crest grows faster than the flat, a lagoon forms. The lagoon then fills with inshore sediments.
- Offshore reefs can form their barrier using storms to move coral and other debris inwards. The recurring storms continually reshape the seaward side of such reefs.

== Distribution ==
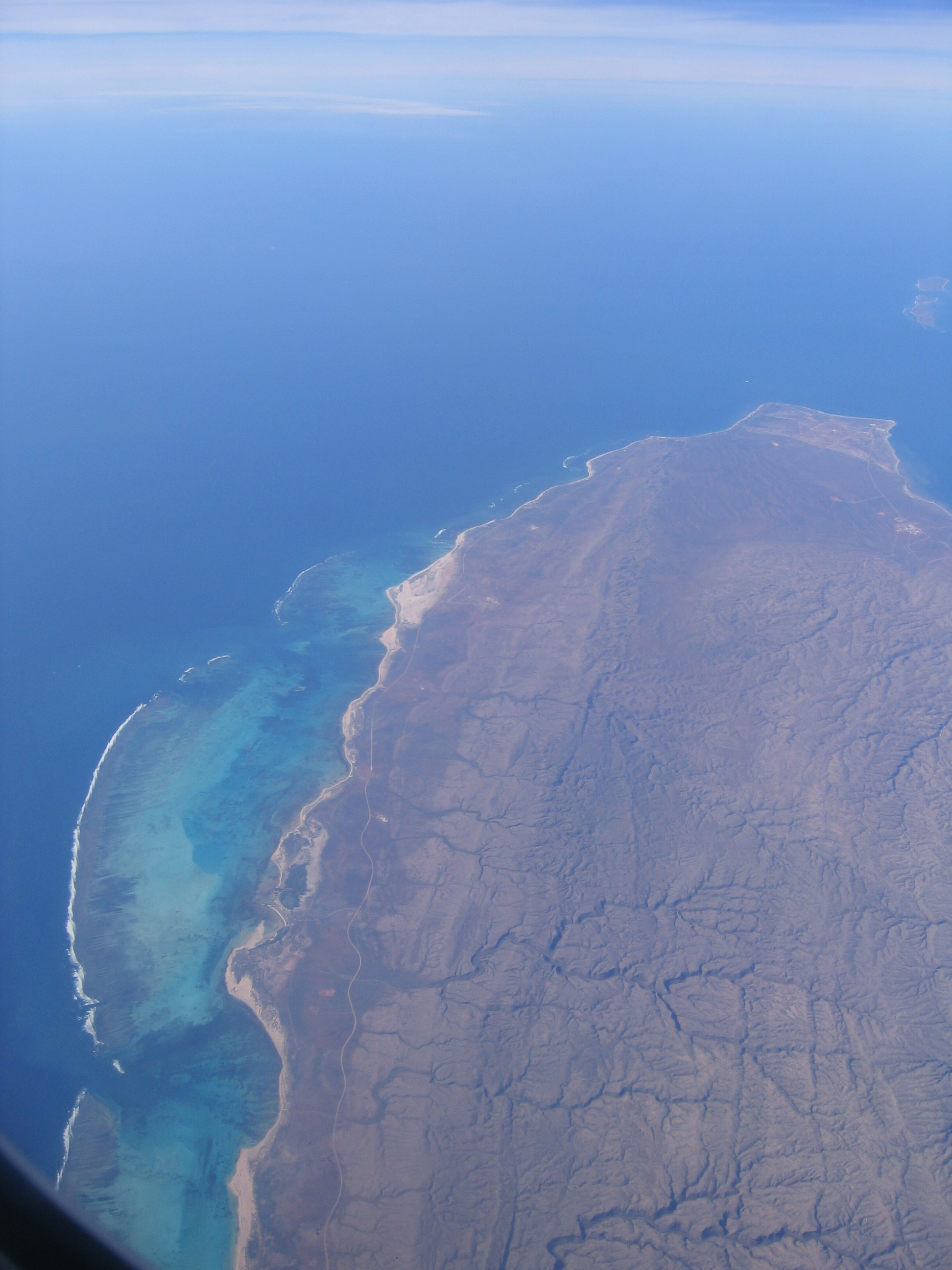
Aerial view of Ningaloo Reef in Western Australia, the largest fringing coral reef in the world and a UNESCO World Heritage Site

Fringing reefs are the most common type of reef. They are located near shore in many areas of the tropics. Generally, these coral reefs are found in tropical waters with a temperature between 18 and 30 °C (64 and 86 °F). Additionally, coral reefs are found between 30º N and 30º S latitude in areas with minimal suspended sediment and sedimentation from continental rivers. Fringing reefs are the most common type of reef found in the Philippines, Indonesia, Timor-Leste, the western coast of Australia, the Caribbean, East Africa, and Red Sea. Of the coral reefs that make up Northeastern Australia's Great Barrier Reef, 760 are fringing reefs.

== Ecology and Human Impacts ==
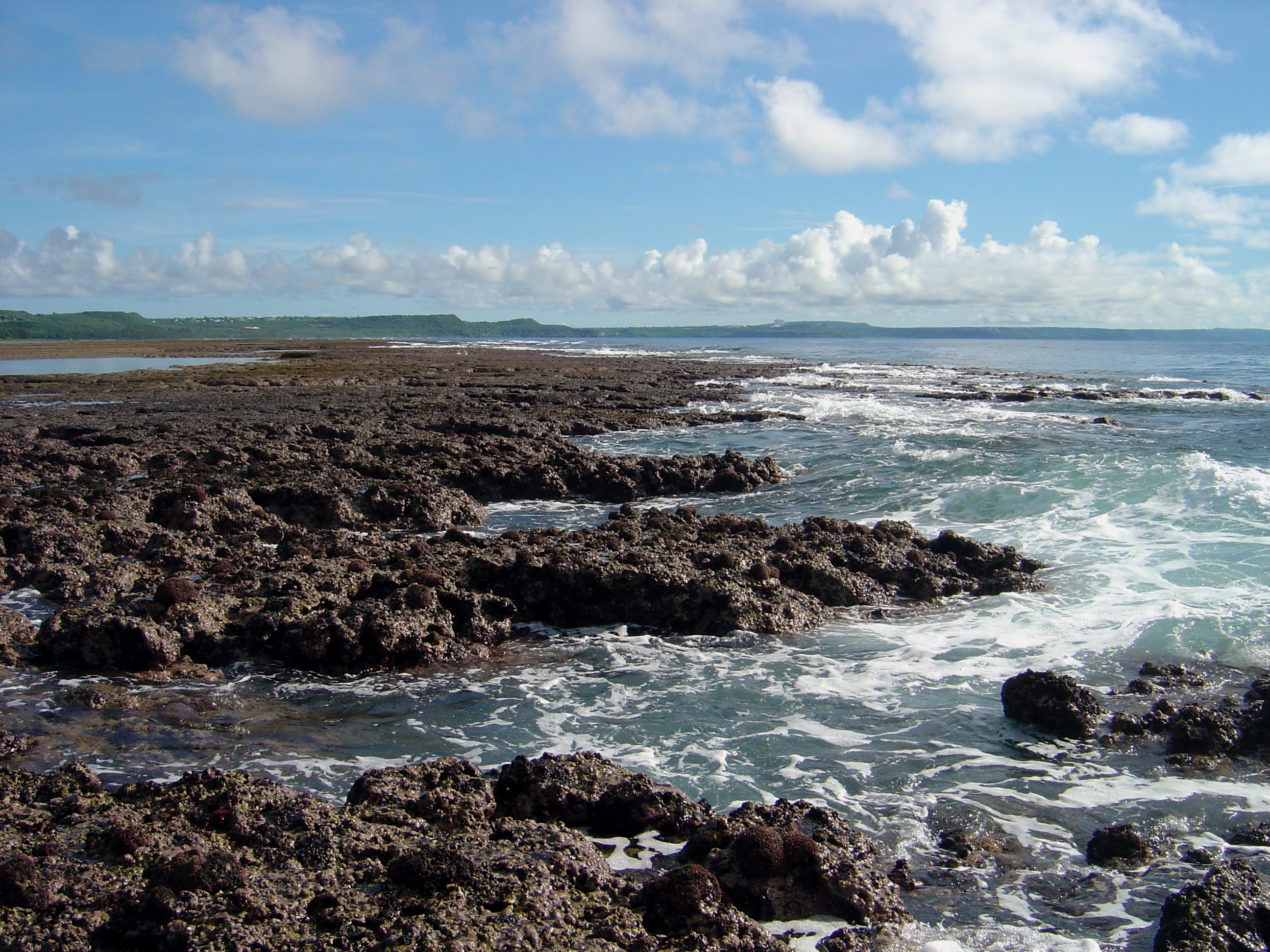
Uncovered reef flat during low tide on Guam

As with other types of reefs, there are many reasons for fringing reef destruction. Destructive fishing practices, such as cyanide fishing, blast fishing, bottom trawling, and muro-ami (banging on the reef with sticks), may have detrimental effects. Bottom-trawling is one of the greatest threats to cold-water coral reefs. Overfishing affects the ecological balance of coral reef communities, disrupting the food chain and causing effects far beyond the directly overfished population. Tourism such as careless boating, diving, snorkeling, and fishing can destroy the reefs. Some tourist resorts and infrastructure have been built directly on top of reefs, with some resorts emptying their sewage or other wastes directly into water surrounding coral reefs.

Toxins from marine pollution are dumped directly into the ocean or carried by river systems from upstream sources. Some pollutants, such as sewage and agricultural runoff, increase the level of nitrogen in seawater, causing an overgrowth of algae, which cuts off sunlight from the reefs. Erosion caused by construction (both along coasts and inland), mining, logging, and farming is leading to increased sediment in rivers. These sediments end up in the ocean, where they can smoth corals by depriving them of the light needed to survive. The destruction of mangrove forests, which normally trap large amounts of sediment, is exacerbating the problem. Mining of live coral is used as bricks, road fill, or cement for new buildings. Corals are also sold as souvenirs to tourists and exporters of the live rock trade.

Corals cannot survive if the water temperature is too high and pH is lower than ambient conditions. Climate change has already led to increased levels of coral bleaching, which is predicted to increase in frequency and severity in the coming decades. Such bleaching events may cause already stressed coral reefs and reef ecosystems to completely die.

== Species diversity ==
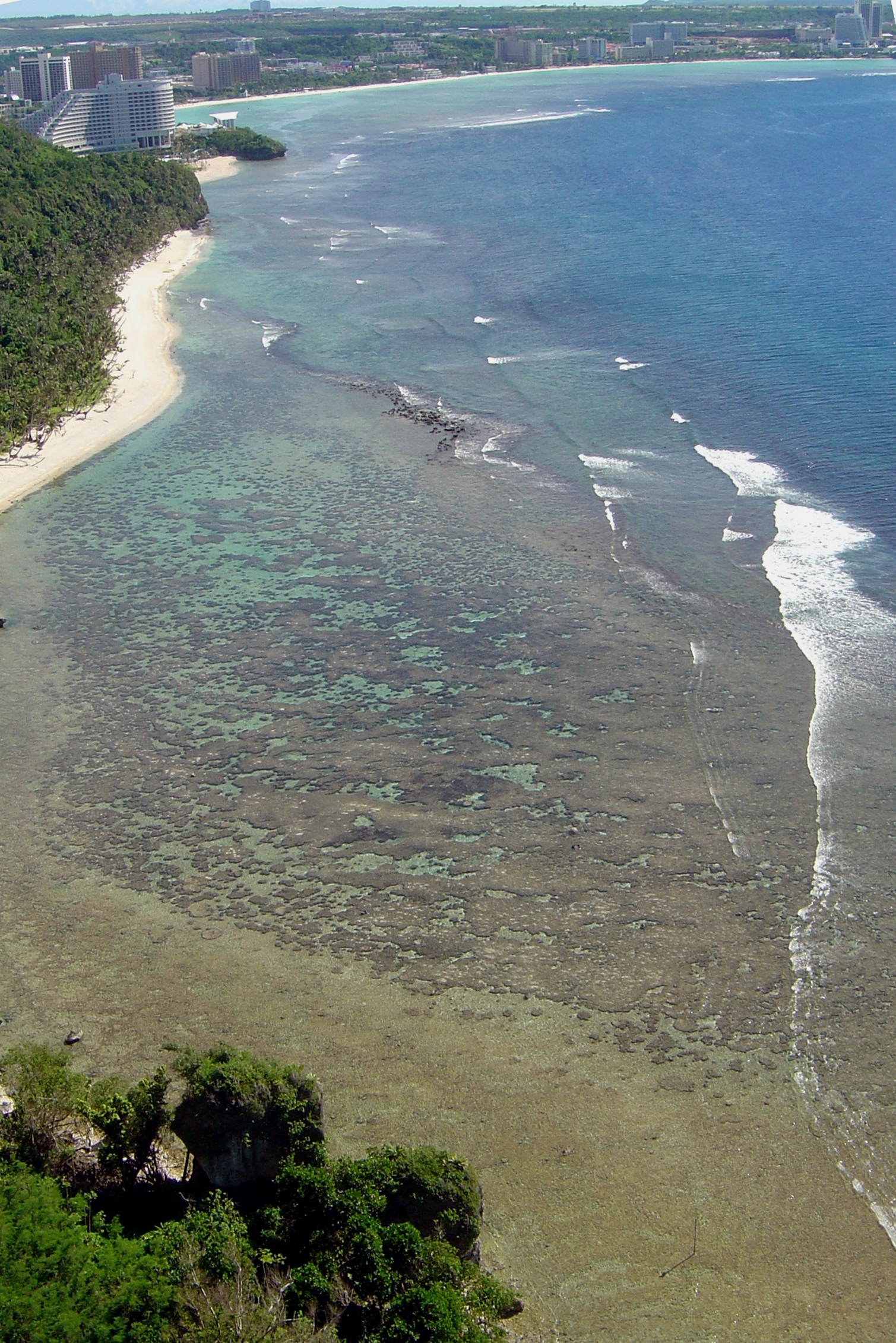
Reef edge and flat at Tumon Bay, Guam

The back reef area has the least species diversity, which increases seaward towards the reef crest. Some of this difference is the result of eutrophication from increased nutrients, sediments and toxicity from domestic and industrial wastes. More macrophytes live on the bottom of the seafloor because of the increase in nutrients. This increase in nutrients has caused elevated number of phytoplankton that are present above the coral reef. The increase in phytoplankton has led to reduced light reaching the coral species and has also led to a greater number of larger invertebrates. Sediments within the environment can cause increased turbidity and may smooth some of the coral, impacting developmental processes. The corals present on the fringing reefs use four processes to get rid of sediments which include polyp distension, tentacular movement, ciliary action, and mucus production.

The landward portion of the reef generally has a lot of fleshy macro-algae which forms on sand and coral rubble. These types of algae include Lyngbya sp. and Oscillatoria sp. Over recent years the dominant species in the reef flat have been affected by environmental changes. On fringing reefs in Barbados, species such as Diploria strigosa, Palythoa mamillosa, and Diadema antillarum are found.

The most common coral found on the reef crest's is Porites porites, a type of stony coral, although there are also significant areas covered in flesh-like algae.

== See also ==
- List of reefs
