= Looe Key =

Coral reef in the Florida Keys, US

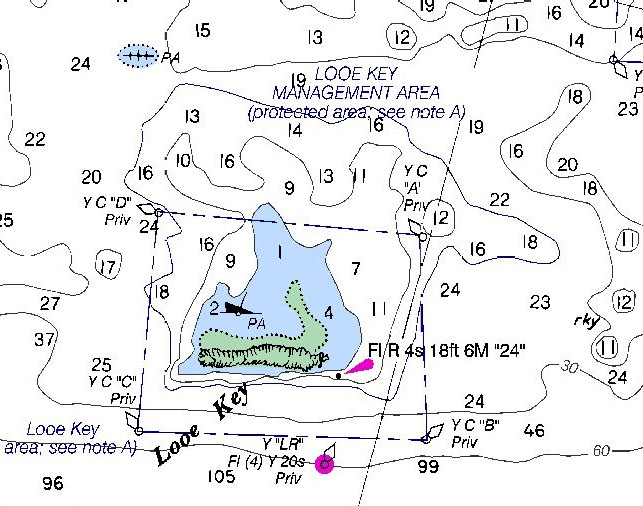
- Map of Looe Key from NOAA Navigational Chart 11445

- Location within Florida Location within the Caribbean

Location
- Location: Caribbean
- Coordinates: 24°32′55″N 81°24′21″W
- Country: United States

Geology
- Type: reef

Looe Key is a coral reef located within the Florida Keys National Marine Sanctuary. It lies to the south of Big Pine Key. This reef is within a Sanctuary Preservation Area (SPA). Part of Looe Key is designated as "Research Only," an area which protects some of the patch reefs landward of the main reef.

The reef is named after HMS Looe, which ran aground on the reef and sank in 1744.

In August 1994, RV Columbus Iselin, a research vessel owned by the University of Miami, ran aground on Looe Key and damaged approximately 164 m^{2} (1,770 sq ft) of living coral and a larger area of reef framework. In 1997, the University paid $3.76 million in natural resource damage claims to National Oceanic and Atmospheric Administration (NOAA). In 1999, a restoration project involving placement of limestone boulders, pouring of concrete, and reintroduction of benthic species was undertaken by NOAA and its subcontractors.

The key was protected as Looe Key National Marine Sanctuary in 1981 until it was incorporated into Florida Keys National Marine Sanctuary in 1997.

== Gallery ==
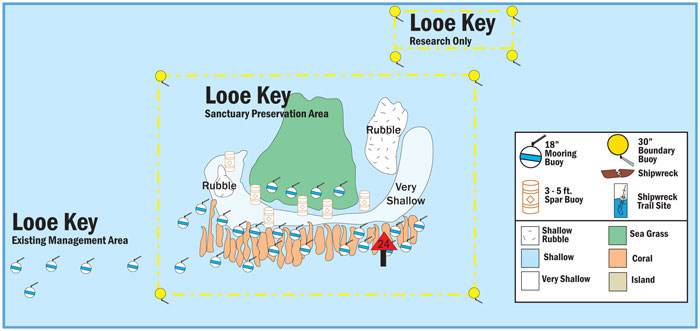
NOAA map of Looe Key

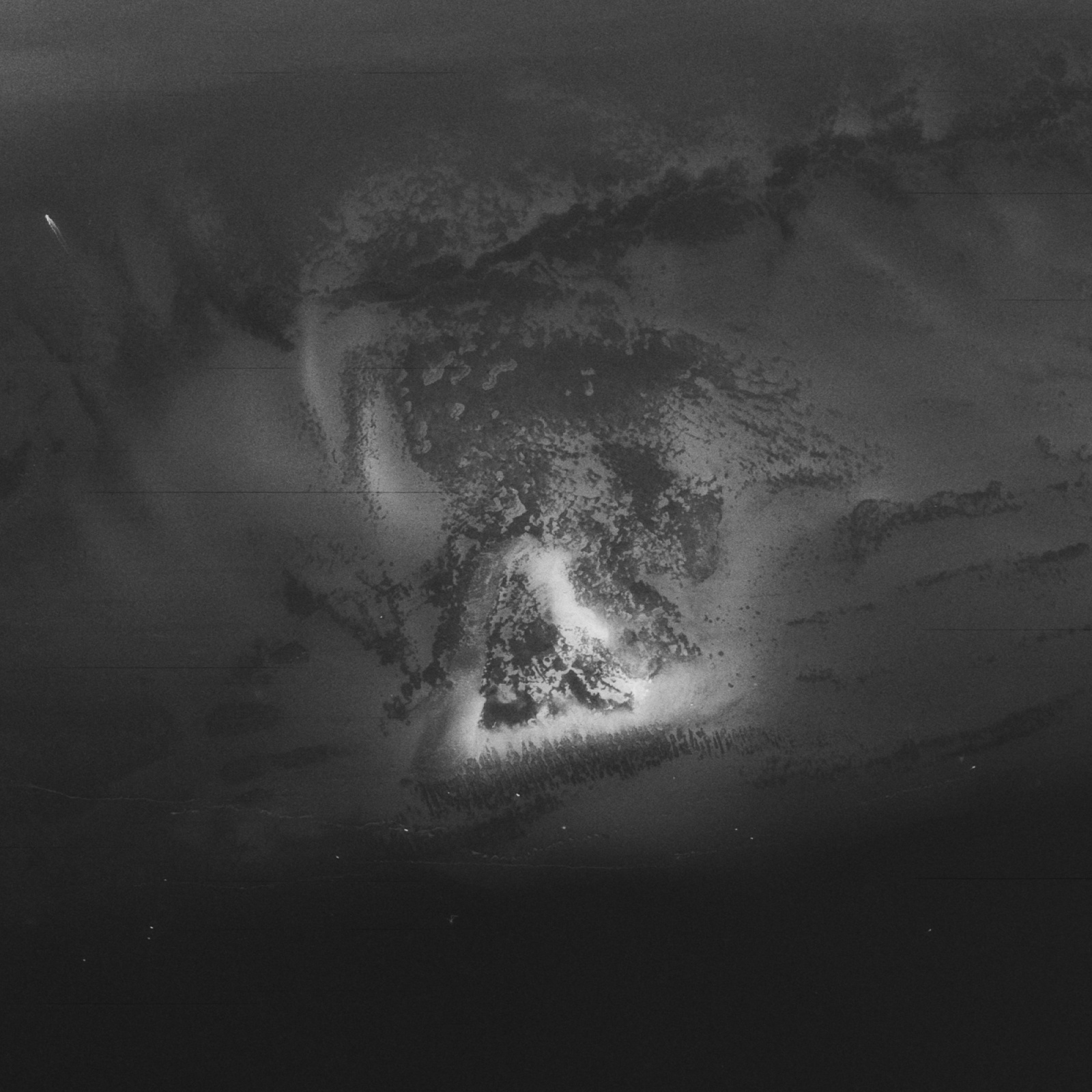
Aerial photo of Looe Key in 1979.

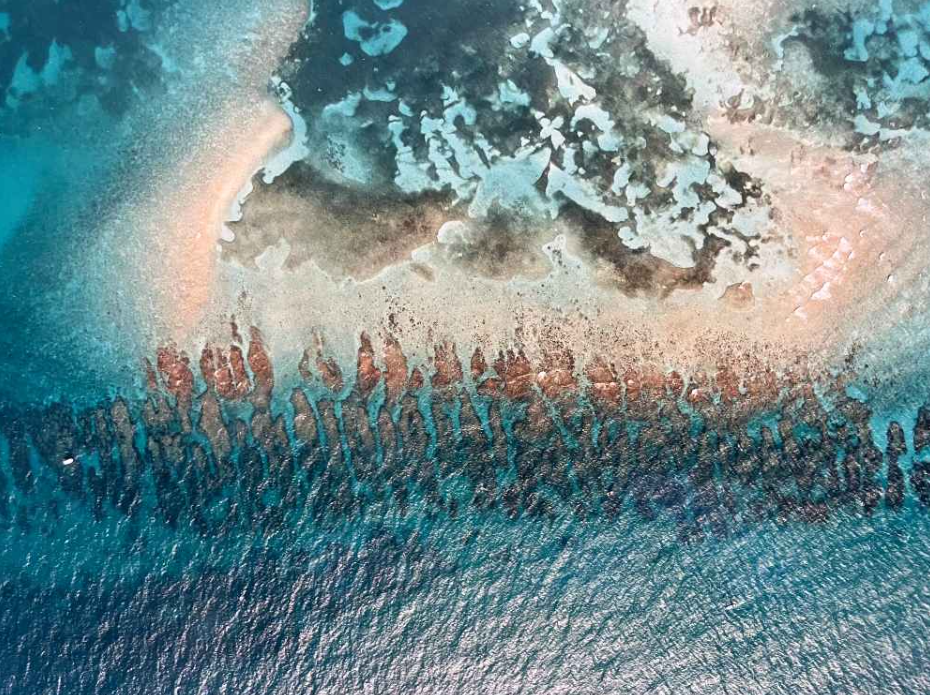
February 1992 satellite photo of Looe Key, revealing its spur and groove formations

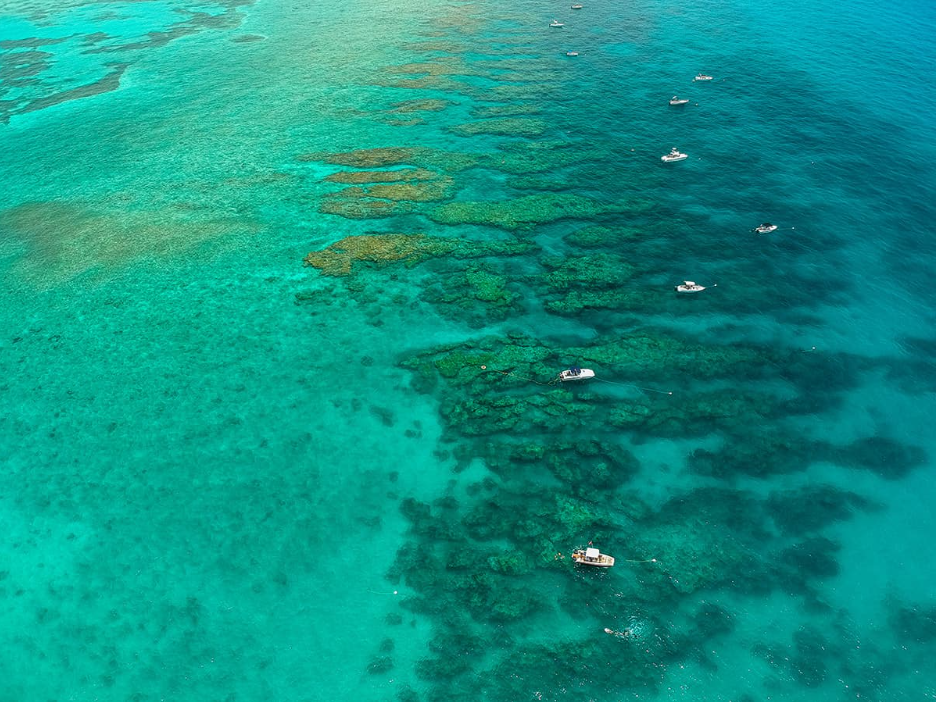
Looe Key

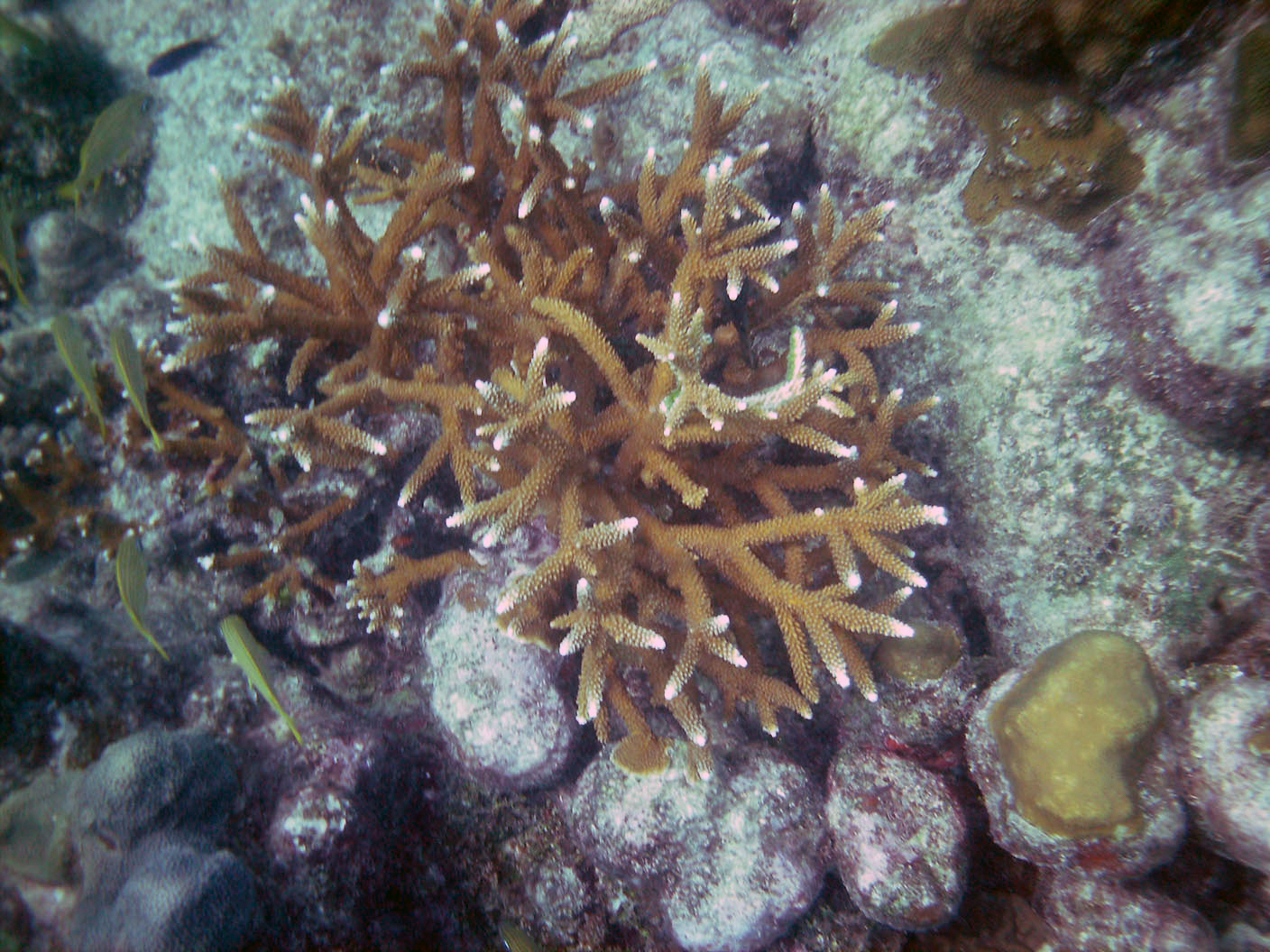
Endangered staghorn coral (Acropora cervicornis) alive at Looe Key in July 2010.

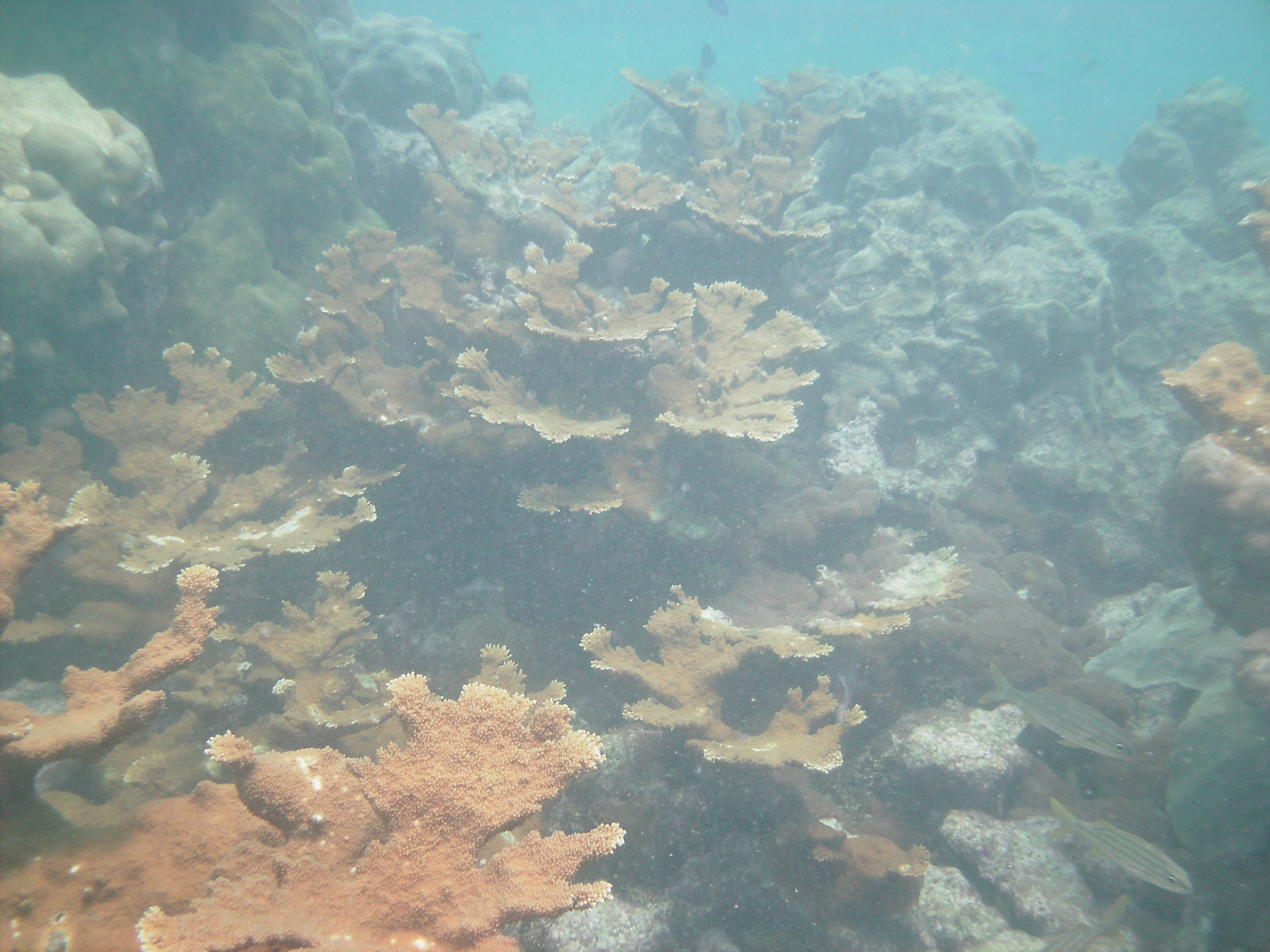
Endangered elkhorn coral (Acropora palmata) alive at Looe Key in July 2010.
