= HMS Looe (1741) =

Frigate of the Royal Navy

Coordinates: 24.5477°N 81.4052°W

History

Great Britain
- Name: HMS Looe
- Ordered: 22 December 1740
- Builder: Thomas Snelgrove, Limehouse
- Laid down: 26 January 1741
- Launched: 29 December 1741
- Completed: 3 April 1742
- Commissioned: January 1742
- In service: 1742–1744
- Fate: Wrecked on 5 February 1744

General characteristics
- Class & type: 44-gun fifth rate warship
- Tons burthen: 685 46/94 bm
- Length: 124 ft 4.5 in (37.9 m) (overall); 101 ft 8 in (31.0 m) (keel)
- Beam: 35 ft 8 in (10.9 m)
- Depth of hold: 14 ft 6.5 in (4.43 m)
- Propulsion: Sails
- Sail plan: Full-rigged ship
- Complement: 250
- Armament: Lower deck: 20 × 12-pdrs; Upper deck: 20 × 9-pdrs; Quarterdeck: 6 × 6-pdrs

HMS Looe was a 44-gun fifth rate warship of the Royal Navy. She grounded on Looe Key off the coast of Florida on 5 February 1744, during the War of Jenkins' Ear.

== Construction and commissioning ==
Looe was ordered on 22 December 1740 from the yards of Thomas Snelgrove, Limehouse to the designs of the 1733 Establishment. She was laid down on 26 January 1741 and launched on 29 December 1741. She was by then the fourth ship of the Navy to be named Looe, after the town of Looe, Cornwall. She was completed by 3 April 1742 at Deptford Dockyard, having cost £6,949.10.0d to build with a further £4,403.7.7d spent on fitting out. She was commissioned in January 1742 under the command of Captain George Carnegie, the sixth Earl of Northesk, for service in the Bay of Biscay.

== Service ==
Looe was with HMS Deal Castle off Vigo on 7 July 1742, and took part in an attempt to cut out privateers from Ponta Nova on 19 July 1742. In 1743 Captain Ashby Utting took command.

Looe was lost off the Florida coast early in the morning of 5 February 1744. She had a captured merchant ship commanded by a Spanish crew in tow when, just after midnight, she struck a reef, followed shortly by the merchant ship. With a priority to escape to avoid capture by the Spanish, the three small boats carried by the frigate were inadequate to carry the 274 survivors, however a Spanish sloop was sighted nearby, which was captured after being chased by some of the crew in the frigate's boats. After the grounded ships had been salvaged for provisions, they were set alight and the survivors departed in the sloop and smaller boats.

The sloop managed to reach Port Royal, South Carolina. One of the smaller boats reached New Providence in the Bahamas, and one was rescued near Cuba. Captain Utting was court-martialled, but acquitted.

The wreckage of the ship and her remaining cargo forms part of the Looe Key National Marine Sanctuary (named after the ship) in the Florida Keys.
