= Gray's Reef National Marine Sanctuary =

Marine protected area off of Georgia, US

- IUCN category IV (habitat/species management area)
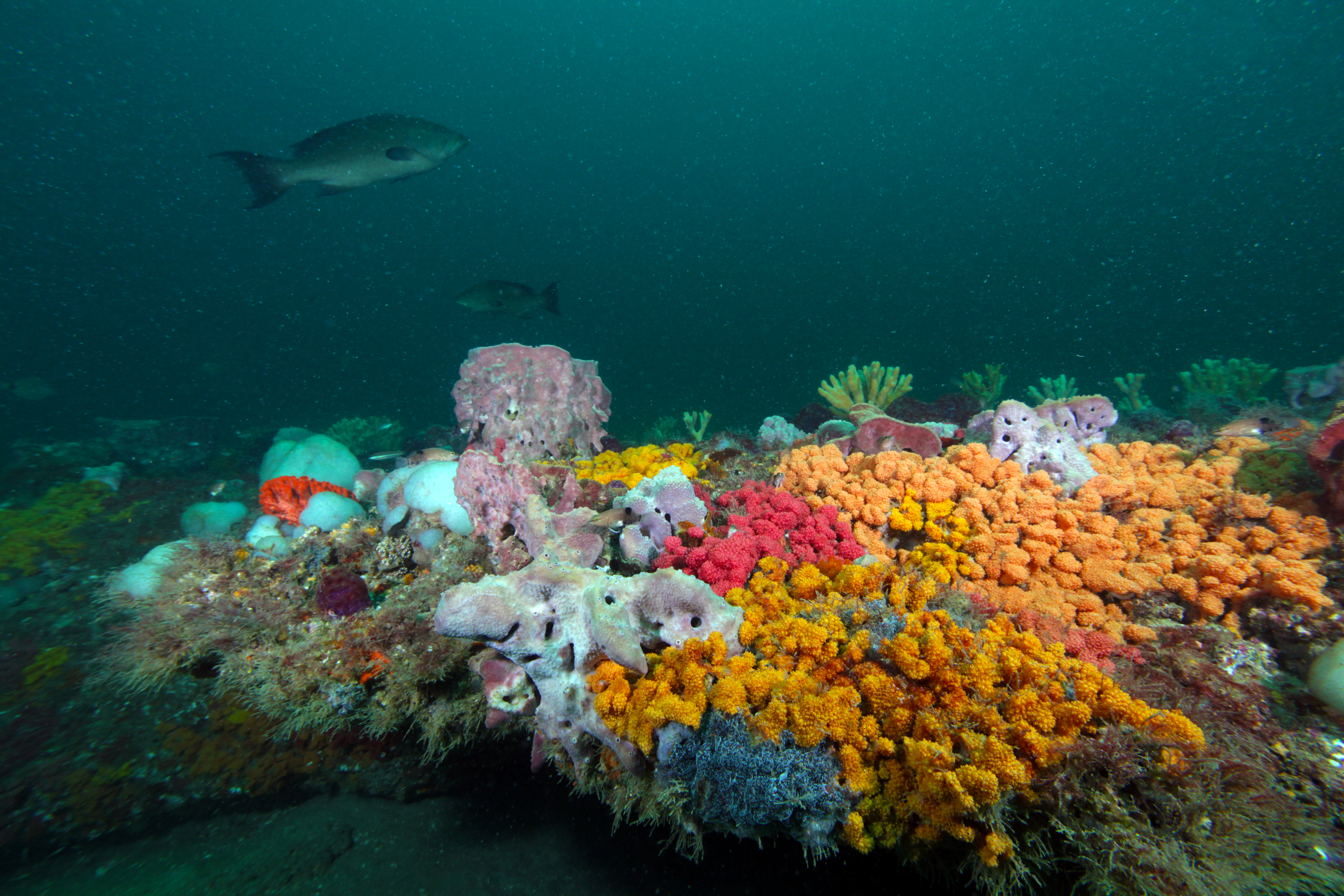
- Sponges in Gray's Reef NMS

- Location within Georgia Location within the United States
- Interactive map of Gray's Reef National Marine Sanctuary
- Location: Georgia, USA
- Nearest city: Savannah, GA
- Coordinates: 31°25′N 80°55′W
- Area: 57 km^{2} (22 sq mi)
- Established: January 16, 1981; 45 years ago
- Governing body: National Oceanic and Atmospheric Administration

Gray's Reef National Marine Sanctuary is one of the largest near-shore live-bottom reefs in the southeastern United States. The sanctuary, designated in January 1981, is located 19 miles (17 nmi; 31 km) off Sapelo Island, Georgia, and is part of the U.S. National Marine Sanctuary System.

Within the 22-square-mile (17 sq nmi; 57 km^{2}) sanctuary, there are both rocky ledges and sandy flat places. The reef's rocky sandstone outcrops, submerged beneath 60 to 70 feet (18 to 21 m) of water, can be as tall as 2 to 3 metres (6 ft 7 in to 9 ft 10 in) and are highly complex. These nooks and crannies provide plenty of places for marine invertebrates to latch on to and for fish to hide in. Together these animals form a dense tapestry of living creatures that in places completely hides the rock. That gives the habitat of Gray's Reef its common name — a "live bottom".

Researchers from the National Oceanic and Atmospheric Administration (NOAA) and the University of Georgia have used the site to study invertebrate and vertebrate paleontology as well as the effects of erosion.

== Human occupation ==
Although Gray's Reef is more than 19 miles (17 nmi; 31 km) beyond today's shoreline, and 60 to 70 feet (18 to 21 m) below the surface of the Atlantic Ocean, it was once dry land and part of the mainland of North America as recently as 8,000 years ago. Human occupation of the area dates back at least 13,250 years, and coincides with one of the most dramatic periods of climate change in recent earth history, toward the end of the Ice Ages in the Late Pleistocene epoch. Sea levels were more than 200 feet (61 m) lower than present levels, and the Atlantic Ocean and Gulf of Mexico shorelines were 100 miles (87 nmi; 161 km) to seaward of their present locations. A 2003 research project undertaken by University of Georgia researchers Ervan G. Garrison, Sherri L. Littman, and Megan Mitchell, reported on Gray's Reef fossils and artifacts, including artifacts from a period of occupation by Clovis culture and Paleoindian hunters dating back more than 10,000 years.
