= American Shoal Light =

Lighthouse in Florida, US

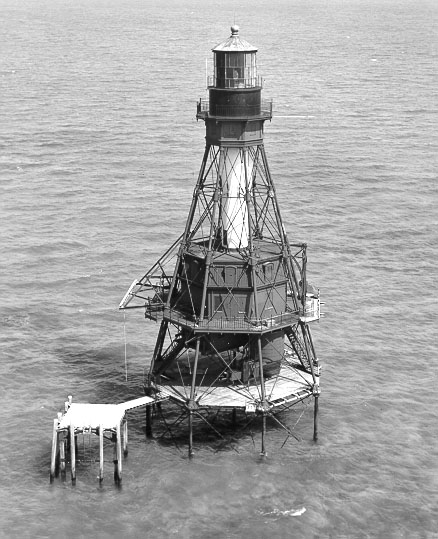
- American Shoal lighthouse
- Location: south-east of the Saddlebunch Keys close to Looe Key; Florida; United States
- Coordinates: 24.525189°N 81.519464°W

Tower
- Constructed: 1880
- Foundation: screw-pile with platform
- Construction: wrought iron skeleton tower
- Automated: 1963
- Height: 110 feet (34 m)
- Shape: octagonal pyramidal skeletal tower with platform and 2-storey keeper's quarters, central cylinder, balcony and lantern
- Markings: red tower and lantern
- Power source: solar power
- Operator: United States Coast Guard
- Heritage: National Register of Historic Places listed place
- Racon: "Y" (– • – –)

Light
- Deactivated: 2015
- Focal height: 109 feet (33 m)
- Lens: First-order drum Fresnel lens (1880), VRB-25 aerobeacon (current)
- Range: white: 14 nautical miles (26 km; 16 mi) red: 10 nautical miles (19 km; 12 mi)
- Characteristic: Fl (3) W 15s. (two red sectors)
- American Shoal Light
- U.S. National Register of Historic Places
- NRHP reference No.: 10001189
- Added to NRHP: January 25, 2011

The American Shoal Light is located east of the Saddlebunch Keys, just off Sugarloaf Key, close to Looe Key, in Florida, United States. It was completed in 1880, and first lit on July 15, 1880. The structure was built to the same plan and dimensions as the Fowey Rocks lighthouse, completed in 1878.

== History ==
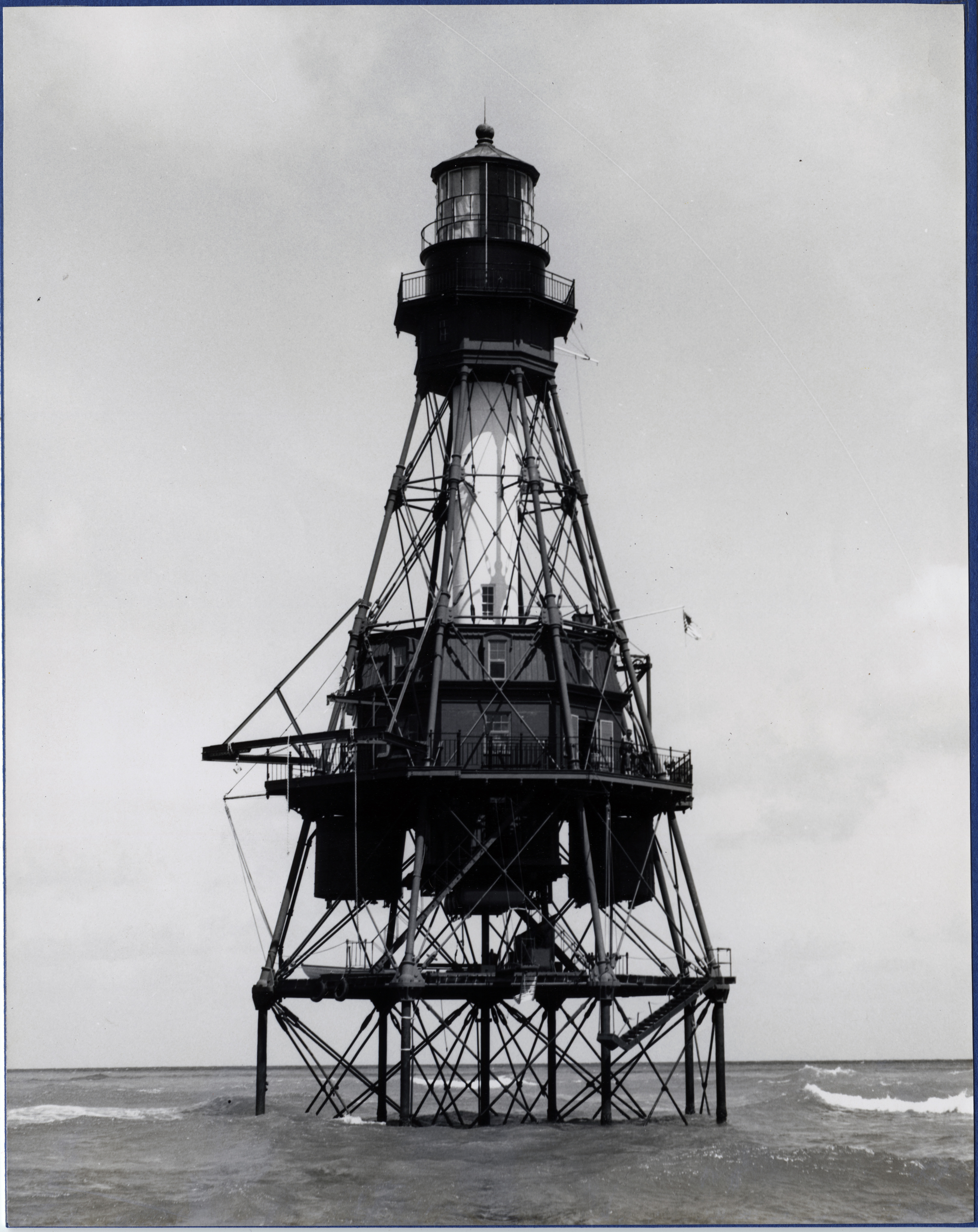
American Shoal Lighthouse, 1955.

As early as 1851 plans were made for the erection of a series of great offshore lighthouses to mark the dangerous Florida Reef. These towers, all of skeleton iron construction, to resist hurricanes, were eventually built one at a time over a period of years, that on American Shoal completed in 1880, being the most recently constructed.

American Shoal was built by a Trenton, New Jersey firm and took only 13 months to fabricate, ship, and erect on site. The site of the lighthouse was 15 miles to the eastward, on the outermost reefs, and was covered with 4 feet of water. Construction continued for about 2 years, and the tower when completed cost about $94,000. The lighthouse was first lighted on the night of July 15, 1880.

American Shoal Light was built in wrought iron on a screw-pile foundation with a platform and a skeletal tower. The Light is 109 feet (33 m) above the water. The keeper's octagonal dwelling is on a platform 40 feet (12 m) above the water. The tower framework and dwelling are painted brown, while the enclosed circular stair to the lantern is painted white. The original lens was a first-order drum Fresnel lens, producing a flash every 5 seconds. The light was automated in 1963, and a fourth-order lens with solar-powered light was installed, the current (non-operational) light is a VRB-25 aerobeacon. The light had a nominal range of 14 nautical miles (26 km; 16 mi) in the white sectors, and 10 nautical miles (19 km; 12 mi) in the red sectors.

The lighthouse is listed as number 1015 in the U.S. Coast Guard light list.

In 1990, the U.S. Postal Service issued a 25 cent featuring the American Shoal Light.

The lighthouse was deactivated in 2015.

On May 20, 2016, 24 Cuban refugees boarded the lighthouse. Elements of the United States Coast Guard repatriated four of the refugees, and interned the other twenty at the Guantanamo Bay Naval Station.

== Head keepers ==
- William Bates (1880 – 1889)
- Henry P. Weatherford (1899 – 1905)
- Alfred A. Berghell (1905 – 1907)
- Arthur C.E. Hamblett (1907 – 1908)
- John Peterson (1908 – 1910)
- William H. Curry (1910 – at least 1915)
- Thomas M. Kelly (1917)
- William H. Pierce (at least 1919)
- Richard C. Roberts (at least 1921 – at least 1936)
- James O. Duncan (1939 – at least 1940)

== Availability ==
On February 1, 2019, it was announced that the lighthouse would be given away freely to any government agencies, educational agencies, non-profit corporations, or any community development organizations who wanted to use it for "educational, park, recreational, cultural or historic preservation purposes." Eligible entities had to submit an application by April 2, 2019.

In late 2021 the U.S. General Services Administration put out an invitation for bids for the auction of the lighthouse. The lighthouse was sold for $860,000 on May 22, 2022 to an undisclosed bidder.

== See also ==
- List of lighthouses in Florida
- List of lighthouses in the United States

== Sources ==
- McCarthy, Kevin M. (1990), Florida Lighthouses, Gainesville, Florida: University of Florida Press ISBN 0-8130-0982-0.
- Dean, Love (1982), Reef Lights: Seaswept Lighthouses of the Florida Keys, Key West, Florida: The Historic Key West Preservation Board ISBN 0-943528-03-8.
