= Spur and groove formation =

Coral reef feature

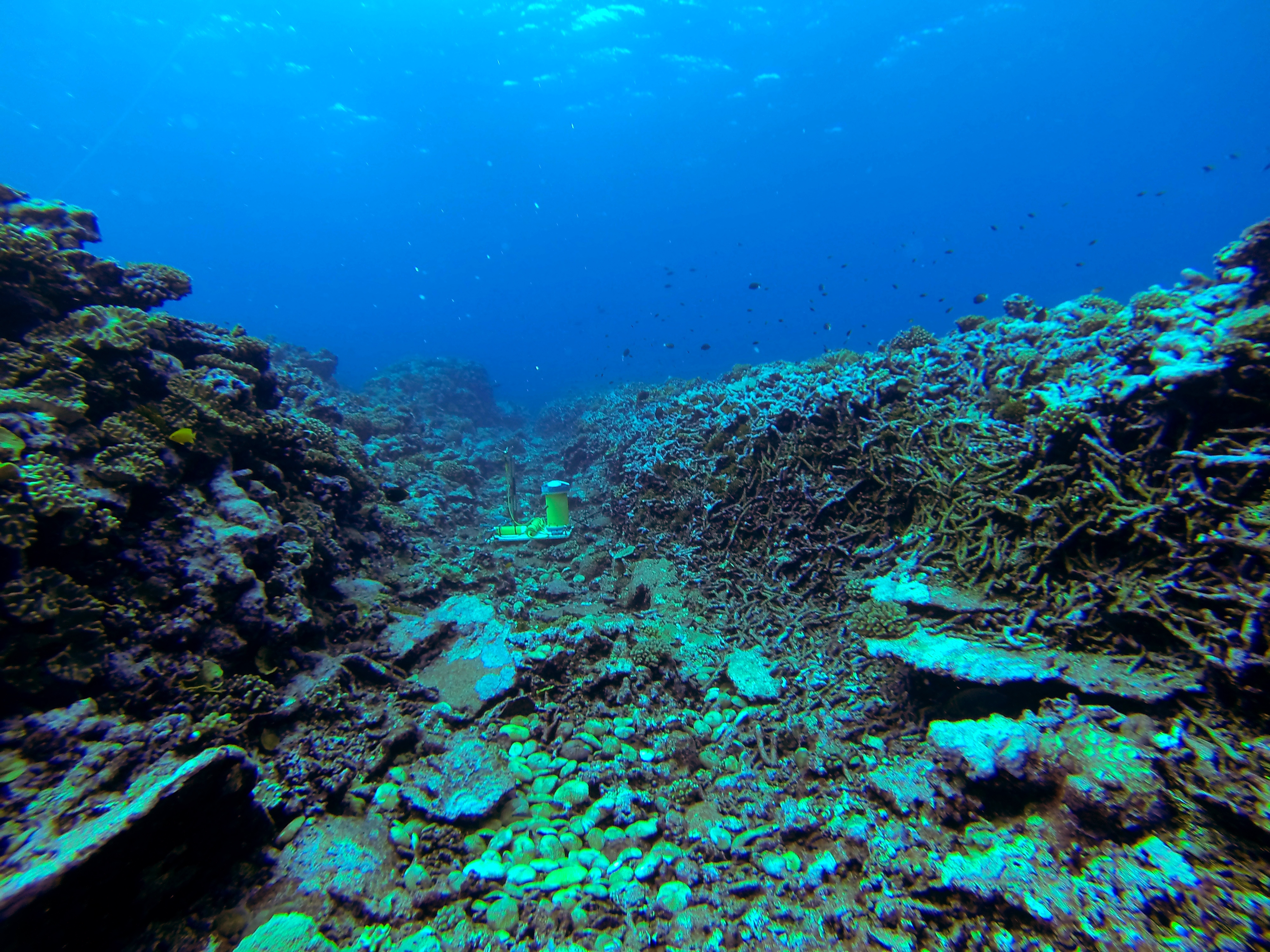
Groove formation

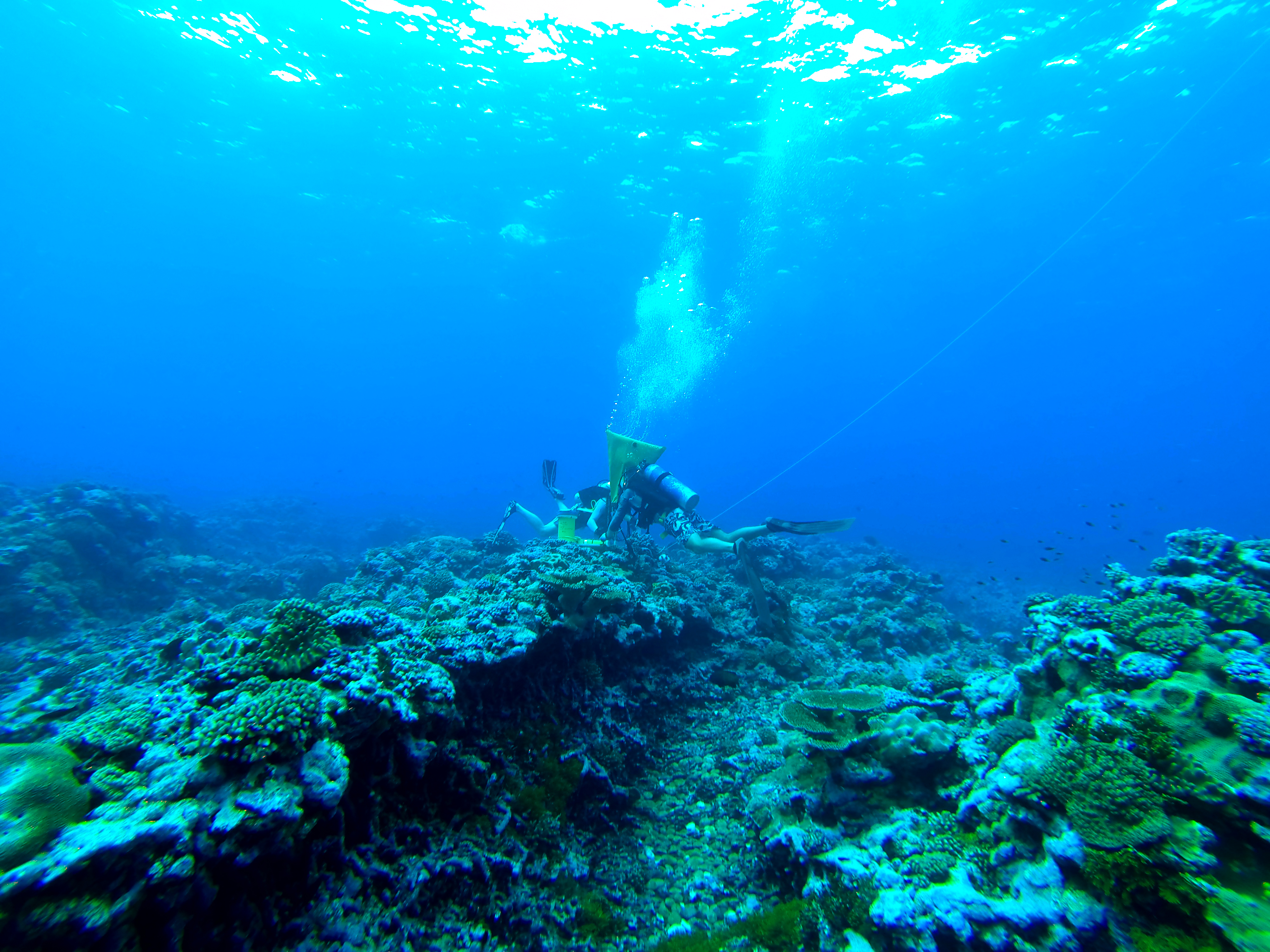
Spur formation

Spur and groove formations are a geomorphic feature of many coral reefs. They are ridges of reef formed by coral ("spurs") separated by channels ("grooves") which often have sediment or rubble bed. Spur and groove formations vary in their size and distribution worldwide but are a common feature on many forereefs of fringing reefs, barrier reefs, and atolls which are exposed to moderate wave energy. Spur and groove formations are influenced by the incoming surface waves, and the waves induce a circulation pattern of counter rotating circulation cells.

The alongshore shape of spur and groove formations varies from smoothly varying rounded spurs, to flat spurs with shallow rectangular grooves, or deeply cut rectangular or overhanging channels sometimes called buttresses. Spur and groove formations have typical scales of: spur height 0.5 metres (1 ft 8 in) to 10 metres (33 ft), alongshore wavelength 5 to 150 metres (16 to 492 ft), width of groove 1 metre (3 ft 3 in) to 100 metres (328 ft), and found in depths from 0 to 30 metres (0 to 98 ft). The mechanism for maintaining preferential coral growth on the spur is thought to be caused by higher wave stress on the spur which causes sediment to be shed towards the groove and downslope and preferential coral growth on the spur. Thus, it is believed that spur and grooves are essentially constructional in formation, while a less important mechanism may occur from sediment scour in the grooves.

== See also ==
- Coastal morphodynamics
- Coral reef
- Coastal geography
- Fringing reef
