= Sombrero Key =

Coral reef in the Florida Keys, US

- Location within Florida Location within the Caribbean

Location
- Location: Caribbean
- Coordinates: 24°37′36″N 81°06′39″W
- Country: United States

Geology
- Type: reef

Sombrero Key is a coral reef in the Florida Reef. It lies to the south of Vaca Key.

The reef lies within the Sombrero Key Sanctuary Preservation Area of the Florida Keys National Marine Sanctuary.

The Spanish called the reef Cayo Sombrero. As part of the reef was above water at low tide, it was also called "Dry Bank".

The Sombrero Key Light was built on the reef in 1858, and continued in use until 2015. The lighthouse tower is unsafe, and boaters are forbidden from tying up to the tower or climbing on it.

== Gallery ==
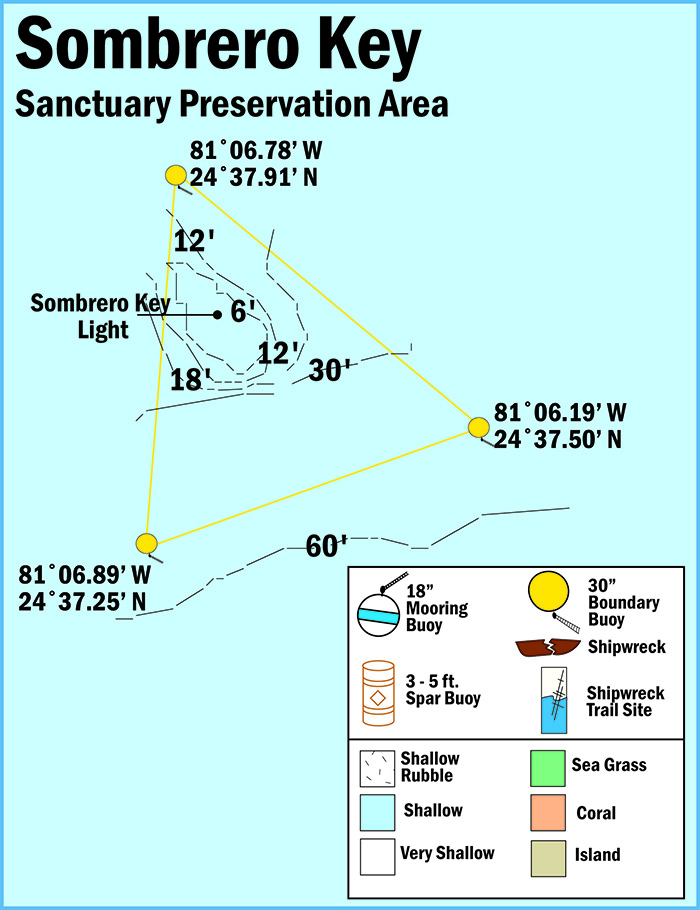
NOAA Map of the Sanctuary Preservation Area

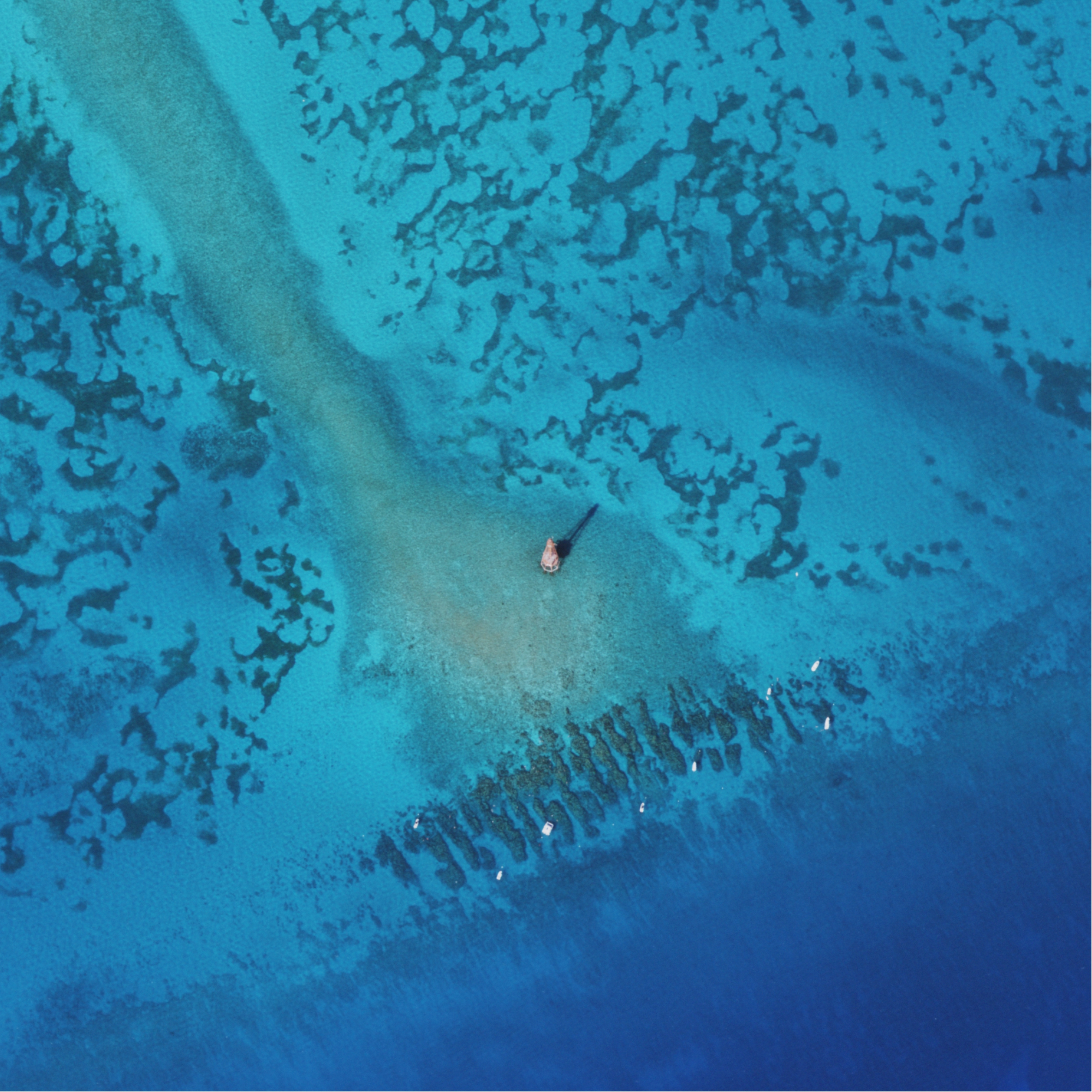
Sombrero Key Light at center, and the reef within the Sanctuary Preservation Area is to the south of it.

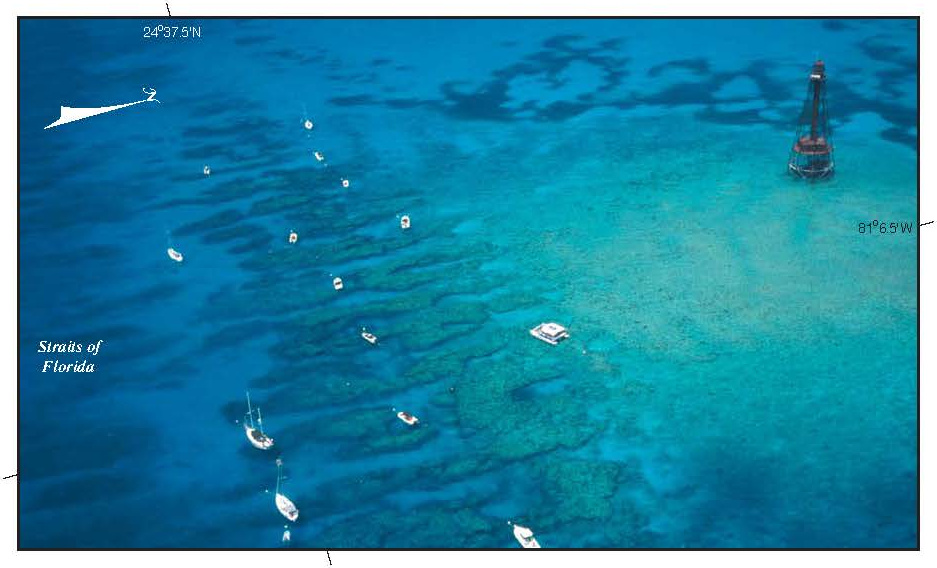
Oblique view
