= Hawk Channel =

Passage in Florida

Coordinates: 24°47′N 80°47′W

View of Hawk Channel from Marathon or Islamorada at sunset

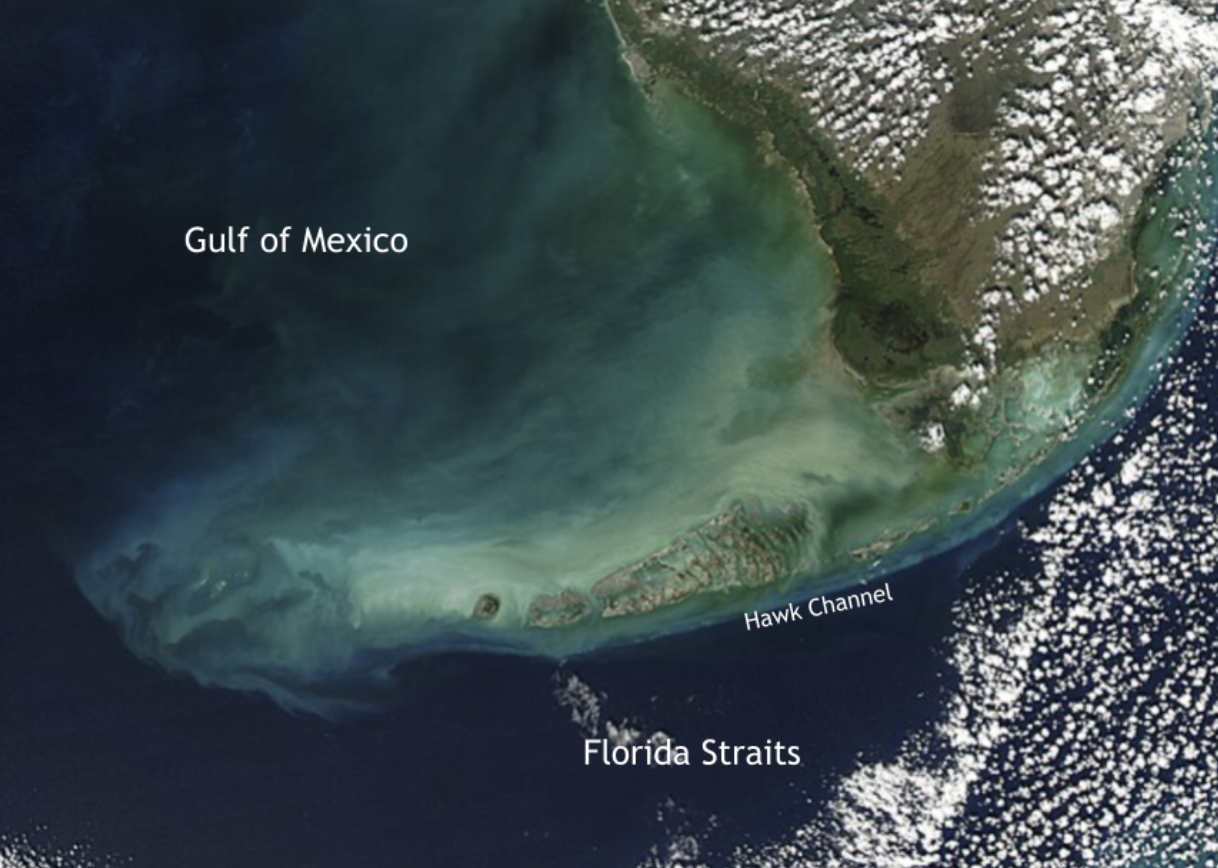
Satellite image of Hawk Channel

Hawk Channel is a shallow, elongated basin and navigable passage along the Atlantic coast of the Florida Keys. The channel makes up a smaller portion of the Florida Platform from Key West to the southernmost point of Key Biscayne and lies between the Keys and the Florida Reef Tract to the southeast. It connects the waters of the Gulf of Mexico to the Atlantic Ocean through tidal exchanges crossing from the Florida Bay to the Straits of Florida.

It extends roughly 230 km (120 nmi; 140 mi) from Fowey Rocks, off Key Biscayne, to Sand Key, off Key West. Its width ranges from approximately 10 km (5.4 nmi; 6.2 mi) to 0.40 km (1/4 mi) wide at its narrowest part. It varies in depth from 7 to 8 m (23 to 26 ft) off the Upper Keys along the center of the channel to 12 to 15 m (39 to 49 ft) off the Middle and Lower Keys. A course in Hawk Channel roughly 3.2 km (2 mi) offshore is partially protected by the deepwater of the Straits of Florida and allows vessels drawing roughly 2.1 to 3.0 m (7 to 10 ft) to avoid the adverse currents of the Gulf Stream while crossing through the Keys.

== Geography ==
Hawk Channel has an orientation parallel to the Florida Keys and serves as the continental shelf for the Florida Keys Atlantic side. It lies south or southeast between the mainland keys and an extensive reef tract 8 km (4.3 nmi; 5.0 mi) offshore. The Florida Reef Tract, a band of coral reefs along the southeast side of the Florida Keys, is located on a narrow shelf that drops off at the Florida Straits and slopes seaward at a 0.06 degree angle into Hawk Channel. A sand ridge lying between Hawk Channel known as "White Bank" is the closest of the two ridges off of the Reef Tract and is subject to open tidal exchanges with the Atlantic. The passage is considered a dividing-line between inshore non-reef and offshore reef areas.

The warm, nutrient-deficient waters that circulate through this exchange are conducive to the development of patch reefs 3 to 6 m (9.8 to 19.7 ft) deep off of Hawk Channel. The course along the channel is partially protected by a fringing barrier reef roughly 3 to 6 mi (4.8 to 9.7 km) offshore, limiting the effects of winds bearing northwest and sheltering the passage from the direct thrust of the Atlantic and Florida Straits. The four central exchanges of South Florida coastal waters of Long Key Channel, Channel 5, Channel 2, and Moser Channel, situated perpendicular to the Keys, produce a current of up to 3 to 4 knots (5.6 to 7.4 km/h; 3.5 to 4.6 mph).

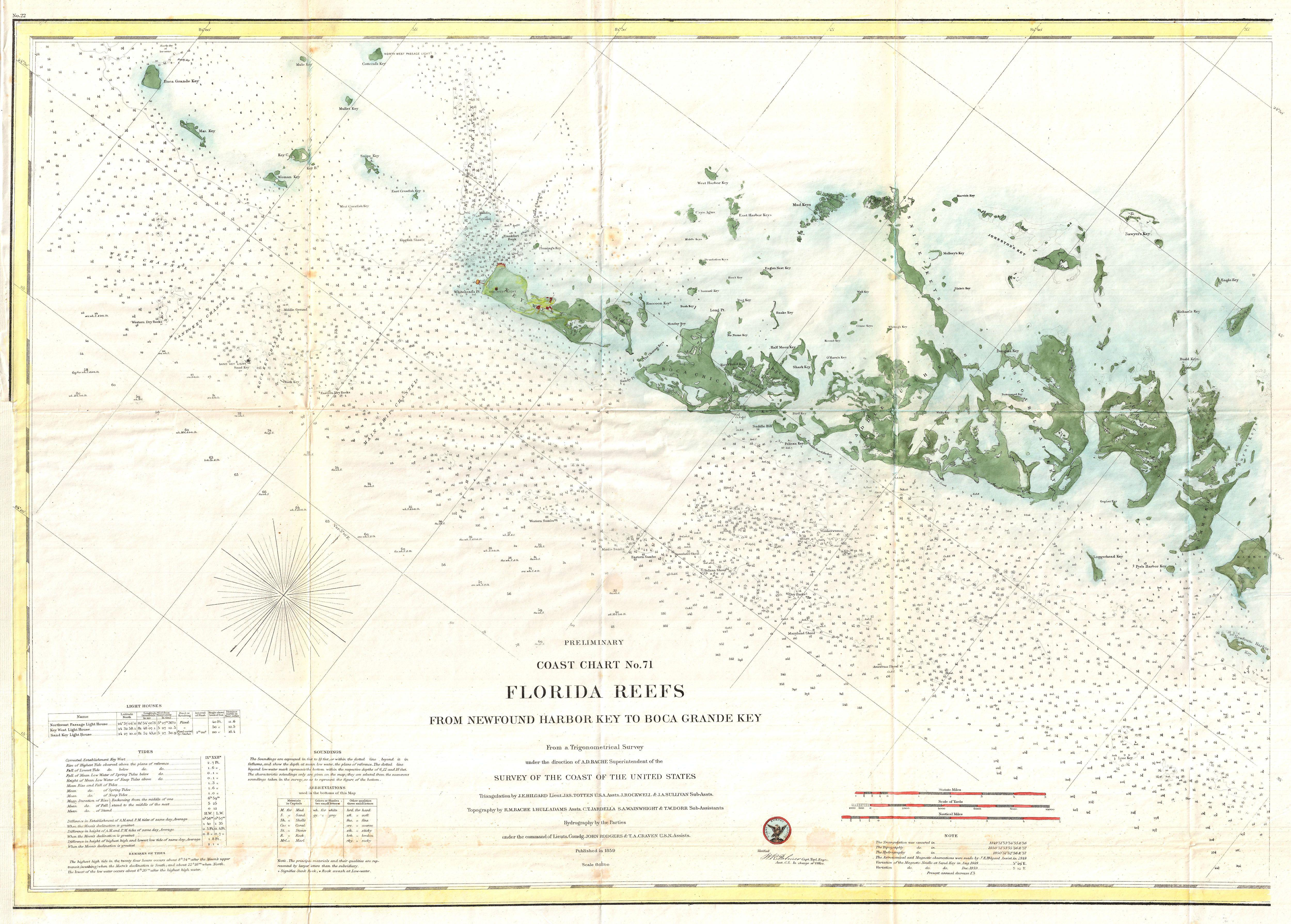
1859 United States Coast Guard nautical chart of Hawk Channel south or southeast of the Lower Keys. The southernmost marker of the channel lies southwest of Key West.

Vessels will often use beacons on the Florida Reef as guides in order to navigate through the entrance of Hawk Channel beginning 10 mi (8.7 nmi; 16 km) south of Miami's Government Cut and 3 mi (2.6 nmi; 4.8 km) south of the southern tip of Key Biscayne, with the crossover between and Biscayne Bay averaging about 4.5 ft (1.4 m) in mean low water (mlw). Most non-commercial vessels may avoid Hawk Channel due to effects of local currents and considerable commercial traffic in the Gulf Stream. Roughly 53 mi (85 km) south of Fowey Rocks, the channel cuts through John Pennekamp State Park, the adjacent federal sanctuary, and Hens and Chickens reef passed the 33 mi (53 km) length of Key Largo before continuing next 30 mi (26 nmi; 48 km) to Key West. Hawk Channel provides comparatively smooth waters protected from Gulf Stream powered winds except when passing through the substantial openings in the fringing reefs found 61 mi (98 km) between Alligator Reef Light and American Shoal Light. According to marine reports, the local current predominately sets fair with the channel except alongside the opening between Hawk Channel and Biscayne Bay where fairly strong crosscurrents exist most notably during an ebb tide.

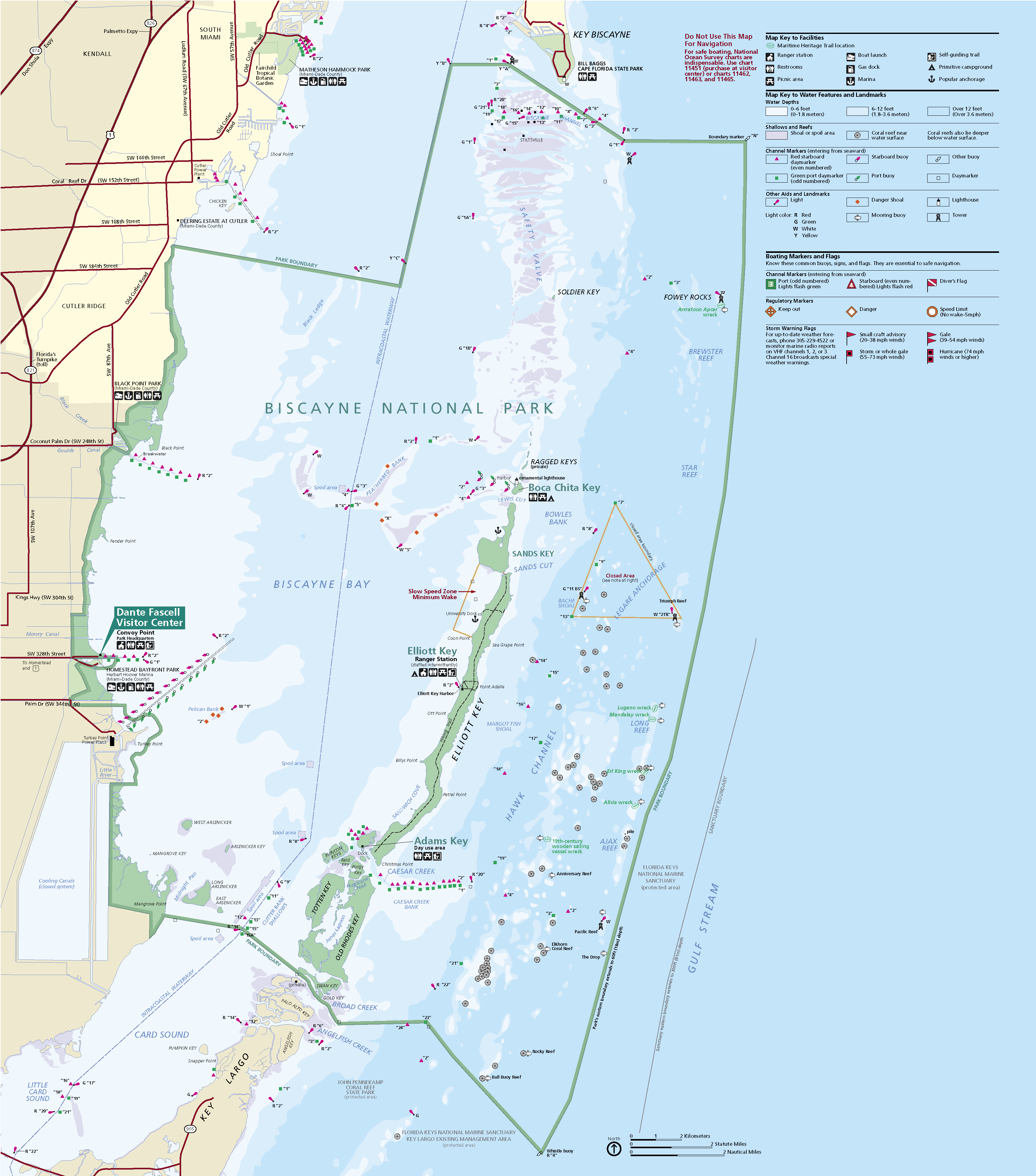
Map of the southern portion of Biscayne Bay; The northern entrance to Hawk Channel can be seen directly east of Elliot Key within the Florida Keys National Marine Sanctuary

The channel runs systemically with the Florida Current pushing water northward from the Atlantic with a velocity of 1.8 m/s (3.5 kn) and a mean transport of 30 Sv. Hawk Channel's ocean floor also makes up the eastern escarpment of the Florida Platform where the Florida Peninsula lies 3 to 4 mi (4.8 to 6.4 km) from the platform's edge. Sand Key Light, the marker indicating the southernmost portion of the channel, is located 6 nmi (11 km; 6.9 mi) southwest of Key West, between Sand Key Channel and Rock Key Channel, two of the channels into Key West, on a small sand covered reef. Hawk Channel contains an estimated 1,000 or more shipwrecks in its waters. A popular diving trail consisting of nine notable wrecks along the channel are designated as "Shipwreck Trail" under the Florida Keys National Marine Sanctuary.

== History ==
Although the exact origins of the name remain largely uncertain, Hawk Channel has been a prominent site for birdwatching; the prolonged bird migration in the fall season goes on from early July until late November where large flights of broad-winged hawks, as well as merlins, and peregrine falcons, are predominant during the September–October migration.

Prior to the Spanish occupation of Florida, the Florida Keys and its surrounding waters, including Hawk Channel, were inhabited by the Calusa and Tequesta tribes. On 15 May 1513, the Spanish explorer, Juan Ponce de León, and his fleet sailed south from Biscayne Bay along Hawk Channel through the Florida Keys. While charting the surrounding waters, he named the islands Los Martires ("The Martyrs"), as they reminded him of suffering men from a distance.

Beginning as early as the 16th century, numerous merchant ships wrecked off of the shallow reefs of Hawk Channel while sailing along notable shipping lanes within the Gulf Stream, expanding the prosperous wrecking industry off of the Southern coast of the Keys. Increasing revenues brought the islands' first settlements in 1822, bringing the fishing industry's use of the passage with it. In 1733, a hurricane wrecked 19 ships of the Spanish treasure fleet on Florida Reef along Hawk Channel. The remaining survivors camped on the nearby Indian Key until they were rescued.

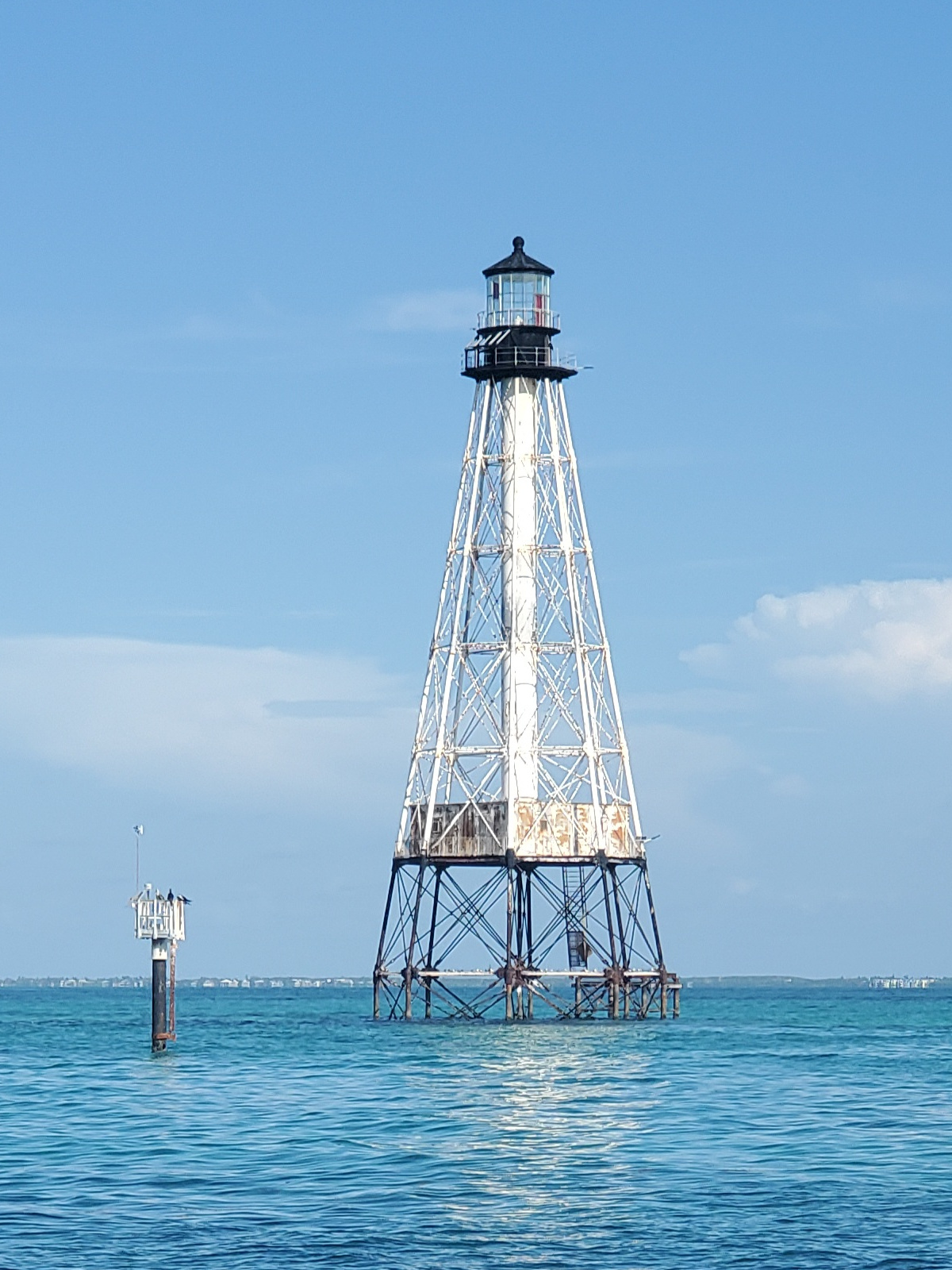
Alligator Reef Light in 2023

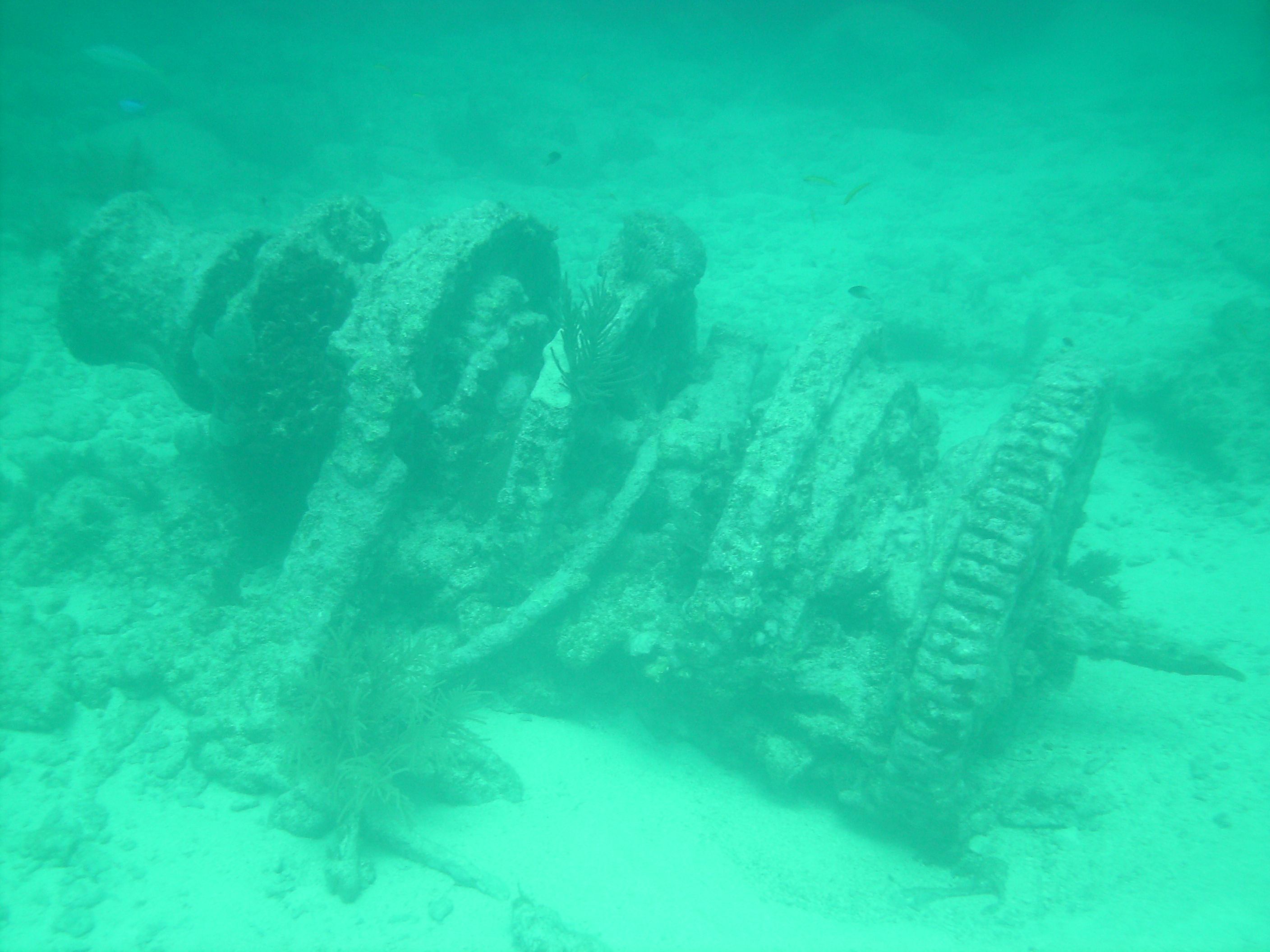
Mechanical winch from the Slobadana, a 170-foot wooden hulled schooner, located at Molasses Reef off of Hawk Channel in the Florida Keys

With the construction of Henry Flagler's Overseas Railroad in 1905, four predominant channel passages were dredged perpendicular to the Keys and the railroad's various bridge extensions, including Moser Channel through the Seven Mile Bridge. These channels allowed the passage of boats and tidal exchanges from the Florida Bay and the Intercostal Waterway into Hawk Channel. Additional channels include Long Key Channel, Channel 5, and Channel 2.

=== Notable sites and wrecks ===
In November 1822, the USS Alligator ran aground on a shallow reef off of Hawk Channel while escorting a convoy of merchant vessels. The United States later sank her in order to prevent its remains from being salvaged by pirates. The wreck lies 4 nautical miles (7.4 km; 4.6 mi) east of Indian Key, near the Matecumbe Keys, north of Alligator Reef itself, and is marked by the Alligator Reef Lighthouse.

In June 1748, the Royal Navy frigate HMS Fowey struck a reef off of Hawk Channel. She sank on 26 June. A few miles south of Cape Florida, the Fowey Rocks Lighthouse, named after the frigate, was constructed in 1878. While construction was still underway, the SS Arratoon Apcar ran aground on the reef.

In 1858, the Sombrero Key Light, the tallest lighthouse in the Florida Keys, was put in service located on a mostly submerged reef that had been referenced in old Spanish charts but had eroded away during the 19th century. The lighthouse now lies near the Sombrero Key Reef.

Between 1921 and 1935, the unmanned reef lights of Molasses Reef Light, Pacific Reef Light, Hen and Chickens Shoal Light, Smith Shoal Light, and Tennessee Reef Light were erected as navigational aids and Daymarks along Hawk Channel to mark shallow hazards.

On 4 August 1984, the motor vessel Wellwood ran aground on the upper fore-reef on Molasses Reef southeast off of Key Largo in 6 metres of water, resulting in the destruction of 5,805 square meters of living corals. The wreck remained grounded for 12 days before it was removed by the U.S. Coast Guard.

== See also ==
- Florida Reef; lies between Hawk Channel and the mainland Keys.
- Florida Keys National Marine Sanctuary
