= Unmanned reef lights of the Florida Keys =

Lighthouses in Florida, United States

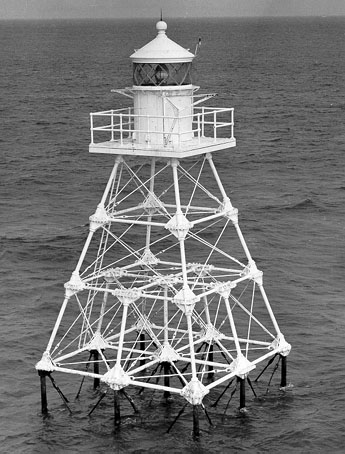
Pacific Reef Light, built to the 1921 design

The unmanned reef lights of the Florida Keys were navigational aids erected near the Florida Keys between 1921 and 1935.

== Overview ==
The unmanned reef lights were intended to mark local hazards and did not need to be visible for as far as the reef lights that were erected near the Keys during the 19th century. (Note: "Reef lights" refers to the skeletal towers erected in the second half of the 19th century in open water along the Florida Reef near the Florida Keys, including Alligator Reef Light, American Shoal Light, Carysfort Reef Light, Fowey Rocks Light, Sand Key Light, and Sombrero Key Light.) By the time the lights in this list were erected, older lighthouses were being automated, and these new lights were designed to be automated from the start. The lights resembled the older reef lights in having a wrought iron skeletal pyramidal structure on a screw-pile foundation. They all originally had lanterns on their peaks, so that they looked like smaller versions of the older reef lights, but had no keeper's quarters.

The first two unmanned lights in the Florida Keys, the Molasses Reef Light and the Pacific Reef Light, were built as square pyramidal towers to the same plan in 1921. The Hen and Chickens Shoal Light was the smallest of these lights, and the only one built as a triangular pyramidal tower. It still exists, serving as a daymark. The lantern has been removed. A design for a standardized hexagonal pyramidal tower was developed in 1932 and used for the Smith Shoal and Tennessee Reef lights erected in 1933, and for the Cosgrove Shoal and Pulaski Shoal lights erected in 1935.

== List of lights ==
Name	Tower shape	Height above water	Image	Original lens	Location	Year first lit	Original characteristic	Tower color	Water depth	Notes
Molasses Reef Light	Square pyramid	45 feet (14 m)		fourth order Fresnel lens	about 8 miles (13 km) southeast of Key Largo; 25°22′N 80°09′W	1921	Flashing white	brown	9 feet (2.7 m)	(Note: The light on the Molasses Reef tower has been replaced by a NOAA automatic weather station.)
Pacific Reef Light	Square pyramid	45 feet (14 m)		fourth order Fresnel lens	about 3 miles (4.8 km) southeast of Elliott Key; 25°22′N 80°09′W	1921	Flashing white, 0.4 seconds	white	7 feet (2.1 m)	(Note: The Pacific Reef Light lantern was moved to a park in Islamorada, Florida. The light tower remains in use as a navigational aid.)
Hen and Chickens Shoal Light	Triangular pyramid	35 feet (11 m)		range lens (300 mm)	2 miles (3.2 km) southeast of Plantation Key; 24°56′N 80°33′W	1929	Flashing red, 3 seconds	red	19 feet (5.8 m)	(Note: The United States Lighthouse Society reports that a red, square, rectangular daymark with a "Lens Lantern" on top of a house existed at Hen and Chickens Shoal from 1899 until at least 1908.)
Smith Shoal Light	Hexagonal pyramid	49 feet (15 m)		fourth order Fresnel lens	about 11 miles (18 km) north-northwest of Key West; 24°43′N 81°55′W	1933	Flashing white, once a second	white	20 feet (6.1 m)	(Note: The original Smith Shoal tower has been replaced by a columnar tower holding a NOAA tide gauge.)
Tennessee Reef Light	Hexagonal pyramid	49 feet (15 m)		fourth order Fresnel lens	south of Long Key; 24°45′N 80°47′W	1933	Flashing white, 0.3 seconds	black	15 feet (4.6 m)	(Note: The Tennessee Reef Light still has its original lantern.)
Cosgrove Shoal Light	Hexagonal pyramid	49 feet (15 m)		200 mm	about 10 miles (16 km) west-southwest of Key West, south of the Marquesas Keys; 24°27′28″N 82°11′06″W	1935	Flashing white: 4 flashes 0.4 seconds each, 3 eclipses 1.6 seconds each, 1 eclipse 5.6 seconds	red	14 feet (4.3 m)	
Pulaski Shoal Light	Hexagonal pyramid	49 feet (15 m)		500 mm	about 30 miles (48 km) northwest of Key West, north of the Dry Tortugas	1935	Flashing white, flash 0.4 seconds eclipse 2.6 seconds	black	15 feet (4.6 m)	(Note: The original Pulaski Shoal tower has been replaced by a columnar tower holding a NOAA automatic weather station.)
