= Wrecking (shipwreck) =

Community salvage of shipwrecks

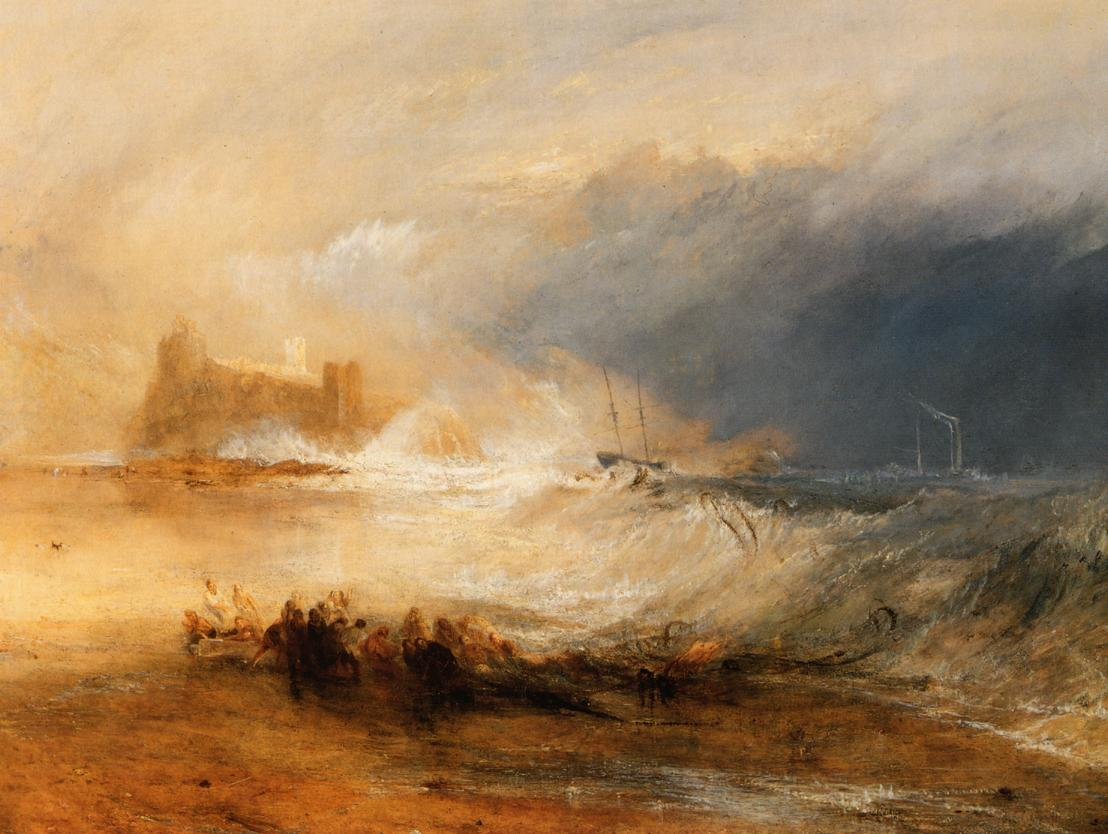
Wreckers, Coast of Northumberland by J.M.W. Turner, 1834

Wrecking is the practice of taking valuables from a shipwreck which has foundered or run aground close to shore. Often an unregulated activity of opportunity in coastal communities, wrecking has been subjected to increasing regulation and evolved into what is now known as marine salvage.

Wrecking is no longer economically significant. However, as recently as the 19th century in some parts of the world, it was the mainstay of otherwise economically marginal coastal communities.

A traditional legendary trope is that of wreckers deliberately decoying ships on to coasts using tricks, especially false lights, so that they run ashore for easy plundering. While this has been depicted in many stories and legends, there is no clear evidence that this has ever happened.

== Luring ships to wreck with false lights ==
There are legends that some ships were deliberately lured into danger by a display of false lights. John Viele, retired U.S. Navy officer and author of a history of wrecking in the Florida Keys, states that such tricks simply would not work. He points out that mariners interpret a light as indicating land, and so avoid them if they cannot identify them. Moreover, oil lanterns cannot be seen very far over water at night, unless they are large, fitted with mirrors or lenses, and mounted at a great height (i.e., in a lighthouse). In hundreds of admiralty court cases heard in Key West, Florida, no captain of a wrecked ship ever charged that he had been led astray by a false light.

A Bahamian wrecker, when asked if he and his crewmates made beacons on shore or showed their lights to warn ships away from the land at night, is reported to have said, "No, no [laughing]; we always put them out for a better chance by night".

Legend maintains that the town of Nags Head, North Carolina takes its name from wreckers or "bankers" deploying false lights. The toponymic legend states that in the 18th century, wreckers would hang lanterns from the necks of mules (colloquially called "nags" at the time) and walk the animals very slowly up and down the beach. The alleged intent was to fool mariners into believing that the slow-moving lights were ships drifting at rest or at anchor, prompting the ships to change course and subsequently run aground.

In 1860, a writer for Harper’s New Monthly Magazine corroborated the story of the "bankers" who gave Nags Head its name.

== Wrecking in the Americas ==
=== Spanish America ===
As soon as the Spanish began sending home the treasures they found in the New World, some of the treasure was lost in shipwrecks. By the 1540s Indians along the coast of Florida, where many of the Spanish treasure ships wrecked, were diving on the wrecks and recovering significant amounts of gold and silver. By that time the Spanish had been using first Indians (the Lucayans from the Bahamas were particularly prized for the task) and then Africans to dive for pearls around the islands near present-day Venezuela. The Spanish began using these divers to recover treasure from shipwrecks. The Spanish kept salvage ships with crews of African divers on-call in major ports around the Caribbean, ready to sail as soon as word of a wreck was received. In the course of the 16th through the 18th centuries the Spanish recovered more than 100,000,000 pesos worth of treasure by such means. Spanish salvage efforts had varying success. Although the Spanish carried out salvage operations on the wrecks of the 1715 Treasure Fleet for four years, they recovered less than half of the treasure recorded as sent on the fleet. On the other hand, the Spanish recovered more treasure from the 1733 treasure fleet than had been officially registered on it.

=== Bermuda and Jamaica ===
In the 16th and 17th centuries, Spanish ships returning to Spain from the Caribbean rode the Gulf Stream to Cape Canaveral and then aimed for Bermuda. Raising Bermuda was essential to Spanish ships for verifying their position before setting course for the Azores. As a result, some Spanish ships wrecked on Bermuda. After the English settled on Bermuda in the early 17th century, they quickly took up "wracking" on Bermuda, and then extended their search for wrecks to all of the Caribbean. Later in the 17th century the center for English "wracking" in the Caribbean shifted to Port Royal in Jamaica. William Phips went there to recruit the divers he used to salvage treasure from a Spanish wreck on the north shore of Hispaniola, where he recovered the largest amount of treasure from a single wreck before the 20th century.

=== The Bahamas ===
Wrecking (or "wracking") was an important activity in the Bahamas from its first settlement in 1648. A company of religious dissidents from Bermuda, the Eleutheran Adventurers, established a colony on Eleutheria. Their governing document, the Articles and Orders, included regulations of wrecking, providing that any salvaged ordnance would be held in common for the defense of the colony, and all other salvaged goods would be delivered to designated agents, "made fit for sale" and then sold, with one-third of the proceeds going to the wreckers.

While the Eleutheran Adventurers were primarily farmers, seamen from Bermuda began settling on New Providence in the 1660s, attracted by ambergris, wrecks and salt. There were vessels dedicated to wrecking from this time, but wrecking was a secondary occupation for most men. These seamen, who called themselves "wrackers" or "wreckers", pursued wrecking aggressively, regarding all salvage as their property. They were rumored to have killed people who had inconveniently survived a shipwreck. They drove Spanish salvors away from Spanish wrecks, and even took goods that the Spanish had already salvaged. Spain regarded the Bahamian wreckers as pirates, and retaliated by attacking the wreckers' ships, kidnapping farmers from New Providence, and burning the capital, Charles Town.

The Bahamian government eventually exerted control over the wreckers. The wreckers were required to carry salvaged goods to Nassau, where they were auctioned. However, goods useful on a ship or in a wrecker's home were often diverted with a blind eye turned by government officials. Increased shipping after the end of the Napoleonic Wars in 1815 led to more wrecks. Vessels specifically designed for wrecking were built in the Bahamas. A U.S law of 1825 required that all goods salvaged from wrecks in U.S. waters be taken to an American port of entry (which, for the Bahamians, meant Key West, Florida). Many Bahamian wreckers eventually moved to Key West and became U.S. citizens.

Wrecking was a mainstay of the Bahamian economy through most of the 19th century. In 1856, there were 302 ships and 2,679 men (out of a total population of 27,000) licensed as wreckers in the Bahamas. In that year salvaged wreck cargo brought to Nassau was valued at £96,304, more than half of all imports to the Bahamas. More than two-thirds of exports from the Bahamas were salvaged goods. The government normally took 15% customs duty on salvaged goods. If the salvaged cargo was not claimed, the Vice Admiralty Court took 30%, and the Governor took another 10%. Shore workers (warehouse workers, agents and laborers) usually received around 14% of the value. The wreckers themselves usually received 40% to 60% of the value of the salvaged goods. Even so, the average annual income of an ordinary seaman on a wrecker was about £20.

The American Civil War sharply cut the volume of shipping around the Bahamas, and the wreckers suffered with far fewer wrecks to salvage. The end of the Civil War brought back increased shipping and wrecks. In 1865, the last year of the Civil War, £28,000 worth of salvaged goods were taken to Nassau. In 1866, that rose to £108,000, and peaked at £154,000 in 1870. Wrecking then entered a decline, and was nearly gone by the end of the 19th century. More lighthouses (eventually numbering 37 in the Bahamas), better charts, more ships powered by steam, better qualified ship's officers, and more seaworthy ships all contributed to fewer wrecks.

=== The Florida Keys ===
For several centuries, wrecking was an important economic activity in the Florida Keys. During the 19th century, wrecking in the Keys became a highly organized and regulated industry, with dozens of vessels and hundreds of men active in the trade at any given time. The Florida Keys form a long arc of islands extending from the southern end of the east coast of Florida to the Dry Tortugas. A line of shallow coral reefs, the Florida Reef, runs parallel to the Keys from east of Key Biscayne to southwest of Key West, with dangerous shoals stretching west from Key West to the Dry Tortugas. This chain of reefs and shoals is approximately 200 miles (320 km) long, separated from the Keys by the narrow and relatively shallow Hawk Channel. The Gulf Stream passes close to the Florida Reef through the Straits of Florida, which is the major route for shipping between the eastern coast of the United States and ports in the Gulf of Mexico and the western Caribbean Sea. The combination of heavy shipping and a powerful current flowing close to dangerous reefs made the Florida Keys the site of a great many wrecks, especially during the 19th century. Ships were wrecking on the Florida Reef at the rate of almost once a week in the middle of the 19th century (the collector of customs in Key West reported a rate of 48 wrecks a year in 1848). For a period of almost 100 years, wrecking captains and wrecking vessels in the Keys had to hold a license issued by the Federal court. In 1858, there were 47 boats and ships licensed as wreckers.

==== Early history ====
Ships began wrecking along the Florida Reef almost as soon as Europeans reached the New World. From early in the 16th century, Spanish ships returning from the New World to Spain sailed from Havana to catch the Gulf Stream, which meant they passed close to the Florida Reef, with some wrecking. The first wreckers in the Keys were Indians; when Hernando de Escalante Fontaneda's ship was wrecked in 1549, he was taken prisoner by Indians who were experienced in plundering wrecked ships. In 1622, six ships of the Spanish treasure fleet wrecked during a hurricane in the lower Keys. Spanish operations to recover the gold and silver from the lost ships continued intermittently for 21 years, but the Spanish lost track of the Nuestra Señora de Atocha, which was finally found and excavated in the 20th century. In 1733, 19 ships of the Spanish treasure fleet wrecked during a hurricane in the middle and upper keys, and salvage operations lasted four years. The Spanish used dragged chains, grapnels, free divers and even an early diving bell to find and recover goods from the wrecked ships.

Starting in the 18th century, ships from The Bahamas began frequenting the Florida Keys. The Bahamians were opportunists, fishing, turtling, logging tropical hardwoods on the Keys, and salvaging wrecks as the opportunity arose. When the Spanish were salvaging the wrecks of the 1733 treasure fleet, the Spanish commander of the operation expressed concern that the Bahamians would try to salvage some of the treasure on their own. By 1775, George Gauld, who produced a chart of the Keys that was still being used 75 years later, advised mariners to stay with their ships if they wrecked, so that the Bahamian wreckers could assist them. Although the Keys were at various times part of Spanish Florida, the British colony of East Florida and the U.S. Florida Territory, the Bahamians took goods salvaged from ships wrecked in the Keys to Nassau for adjudication, rather than to the Florida port of entry, St. Augustine. After the end of the Napoleonic Wars and the War of 1812 in 1815, increased shipping through the Straits of Florida resulted in an increase in wrecks on the Keys, and the Crown's share from the auction of salvaged goods became the major support of the economy of Nassau.

==== Under United States jurisdiction ====
After 1815, fishing boats from New England began visiting the Florida Keys in the winter to fish for the Havana market. These fishermen engaged in wrecking when the opportunity arose. With the acquisition of Florida by the United States in 1821 and the settlement of Key West in 1822, the New England fishermen-wreckers began moving their homes to Key West. Conflicts quickly developed with the Bahamian wreckers. U.S. Navy ships stopped and boarded Bahamian wreckers to check papers, and arrested two Bahamian captains on suspicion of smuggling slaves. American wreckers became increasingly hostile to Bahamian wreckers, and in 1825 the U.S. Congress passed a law requiring all goods salvaged in U.S. waters to be taken to an American port of entry. This measure created a great inconvenience for the Bahamian wreckers, as they had to take salvaged goods and ships to Key West before they could return home to the Bahamas. Some of them soon moved to Key West and acquired U.S. citizenship.

Key West had become a port of entry in 1822. In the same year, the U.S. Navy chose Key West as its base for suppressing piracy in the West Indies. The city quickly developed into Florida's most important port. By the 1830s, Key West accounted for 60% to 90% of imports and exports for the Territory. Most of this traffic was due to the activities of the wreckers. Warehouses for storing salvaged goods, shipyards for repairing damaged ships that had been removed from the reefs and for building vessels to be used in wrecking, and ship chandlers for refitting ships all contributed to the city's prosperity.

In the 1820s and 1830s, Indian Key functioned as a secondary center for the wrecking industry in the Keys. Closer to most of the reefs off the keys than Key West, Indian Key enjoyed a brief prosperity before being destroyed in a raid by Seminoles in 1840.

==== Wrecking operations ====
Wrecking in the Florida Keys was conducted from sailing vessels. Numerous vessels would patrol along the Florida Reef looking for wrecks. The wreckers would normally anchor at night in protected anchorages along the Keys, and then sail out in the morning to see if any ships had wrecked during the night. As a result, a ship that ran on the reef during the night might attract a dozen wreckers by the afternoon of the next day. The first wrecking captain to reach a stranded ship became the wreck master, determining how many wreckers he needed to help salvage the ship, and directing the operation. Wreckers had an obligation to save passengers and crew of the wrecked ship (for which they received no compensation), and to salvage as much of the cargo as possible, and the ship, as well. If the judge in Federal court decided that a wrecking crew had not done everything possible to salvage cargo and ship, he would reduce the award.

The salvaged cargo and the ship, if it could be saved, were taken to Key West where they were appraised or auctioned. The wrecking vessels and crews that participated in the operations would then be awarded a share of the salvage value. Half of the salvage award went to the owners of the wrecking vessels, divided among the boats on a tonnage basis. The other half went to the wrecker crews, proportional to the number of crewmen on each vessel. Ordinary crewmen received one share, "boys" a half-share, cooks, one-and-a-quarter shares, and captains one to three shares, depending on the size of the vessel. Divers, who dived into the flooded holds of ships to retrieve cargo, received extra shares. By the time a salvage award was divided this way, individual shares were often quite small. Contemporary observers estimated that wrecking crews on average made no more than an ordinary seaman.

In the first few years after Florida was acquired by the United States, salvage awards were determined either by prior agreement between the wreck master and the captain of the wrecked ship, or by arbitration. As the persons available to serve as arbitrators usually had ties to the wrecking industry, if not a direct business relationship with the wreck master and/or the owners of the wrecking vessels, the process was often abused, with awards as high as 90% of the salvaged value. In 1829, a United States District Court was established in Key West with admiralty jurisdiction, after which most salvage cases were decided in court. Court awards for a wrecking operation averaged about 25% of the salvage value. Private agreements and arbitration remained an option, however, particularly when the judge was not available. A visitor to Key West in the 1880s reported that the United States District Court was in session almost every week, and had heard more than 700 Admiralty law cases during the preceding year.

Wreckers were required by the Federal law to carry equipment that might be needed to save cargo and ships. Such equipment included heavy anchors for kedging (hauling) ships off reefs, heavy hawsers and chain, fenders and blocks and tackle. Wreckers also had to be prepared to make emergency repairs to ships to refloat them or keep them afloat while they were sailed or towed back to Key West. By the middle of the 19th century, windmill-powered pumps, and later a steam-powered pump, were kept in Key West. If the wreckers were not able to pump out a ship fast enough to float it using the ship's own pumps, they could rent one of the large pumps from Key West. As the wrecking vessels could not always directly approach wrecked ships, they had to carry sturdy boats.

Cargoes saved by wreckers varied tremendously. Cotton was perhaps the most valuable bulk cargo. A bale of cotton might be worth US$50 or $60 in Charleston, South Carolina, but a bale pulled from a flooded hold would be saturated with water, and weigh as much as half a ton. Unusual cargoes salvaged by wreckers included the fossilized "Hydrarchos" skeleton collected in Alabama by Albert Koch, and a locomotive. In 1827, Guerrero, a Spanish slave-runner carrying 500 African captives, and the Royal Navy warship HMS Nimble ran onto the Florida Reef during a running gun battle. Wreckers went to the aid of both ships. After most of the Africans and the Spanish crewmen had been transferred to wrecker vessels, the Spanish crewmen commandeered two of the ships and sailed to Cuba with most of the Africans. The remaining 120 Africans were taken to Key West, and then to St. Augustine. After Congress passed a special law the next year, 96 surviving Africans were sent to Liberia.

==== Decline ====
In an effort to reduce the number of wrecks along the Florida Reef, the United States government funded the construction of lighthouses. Lighthouses were built in the 1820s at Cape Florida, Key West (both on the island itself and on nearby Sand Key), and on Garden Key in the Dry Tortugas. A lightship was stationed at Carysfort Reef. Mariners complained that the lights were not visible enough. There were also long interruptions. The Cape Florida lighthouse was burned by Seminoles in 1836 and remained dark for ten years. It was also dark while the tower was made higher in 1855. It was put out of commission again in 1860 by Confederate sympathizers and remained dark until the end of the American Civil War in 1865. The Key West and Sand Key lighthouses were destroyed by a hurricane in 1846. A lightship was placed at Sand Key until the lighthouses could be rebuilt. Beginning in 1852 lighthouses were built directly on the Florida Reef, but it was 1880 before mariners could rely on having a lighthouse in sight at all times while sailing along the Florida Reef.

The wreckers were unhappy about the lights, expecting them to reduce the number of wrecks and their livelihood. Initially, however, the lights did not greatly reduce the number of wrecks. Some ships wrecked when their captains became confused about which lights they were seeing, mistaking lights on the Florida Reef for lights on the Bahama Banks. Some wrecks may have been deliberate, as well. On a few occasions wreckers trying to refloat flooded ships discovered that holes had been bored through the hull below the water line. The captain of a ship that had wrecked stated that the wreck was not to be greatly regretted, as there were too many ships in the freight business. Judge Marvin of the Federal court in Key West told a navy officer in 1860 there was "a great deal of wrecking by design."

Shipping through the Straits of Florida, and therefore the number of wrecks on the Florida Reef, declined sharply during the Civil War. Following the Civil War, the number of wrecks did not increase as fast as the ship traffic through the Straits. More lighthouses were in place, better charts were available, and more ships were powered by steam and thus less vulnerable to being pushed onto reefs by unfavorable winds. Steam-powered vessels began to enter the wrecking trade. Eventually ocean-going tugboats took over what became known as marine salvage operations. By the end of the 19th century, wrecks were infrequent. The last major wrecking operation was in 1905, when 77 small vessels and 500 men salvaged cargo from the steamer Alicia. Salvage work was abandoned when divers refused to continue, as contaminated water in the hold was causing them to become blind for 24 hours after a dive. The salvage award was US$17,690. The last local wrecker was bought out by a New York company in 1920. The Federal court closed the book of wrecking licenses the next year.

=== British North America and Canada ===
Residents of the isolated communities along the outer banks of North Carolina and the Islands of Hatteras, Ocracoke, and Portsmouth and in Newfoundland and the islands and coastline of the Gulf of Saint Lawrence and engaged in wrecking for many years. In Nova Scotia, Seal Island and especially Sable Island were known for wrecking. Reports of violent wreckers on Sable helped spur efforts by the colony of Nova Scotia to establish a rescue station in Sable Island in 1801.

== Wrecking in Europe ==
=== Britain ===
Wrecks were frequent in Devon and Cornwall where the rocky coastline, and strong prevailing onshore winds helped wreck many merchant ships and warships.

In 1735 a law was passed to make it an offence to make false lights, but no one was prosecuted as a result. In 1753 the co-called Wreck Act made unauthorized wrecking a felony punishable by death. In 1769 William Pearse was hanged at Launceston in Cornwall for stealing from a wreck. It was not until after a case in the Court of Appeal in 1870 that rewards were made for rescuing people.

Wrecking was a major industry in the 19th century, and as far back as the 16th century, especially of ships returning from the New World using the Gulf Stream, which passes by the south west of England. This would help to speed these ships on their way to France and Spain and put them out of position. Wreckers would attempt to frighten off the curious, suspicious or unwanted visitors, by spreading wild rumours concerning supernatural activity, ghosts and cannibals near their wrecking sites.

Wrecking was a major activity of the inhabitants of Stroma Island in the Pentland Firth off the north of Scotland. It was also well known on the Goodwin Sands off the south east of England where over 2000 wrecks have occurred. The boatmen of Deal, who took supplies to ships at anchor off the coast, would plunder any wrecked vessel. Another area where wrecking was prevalent was the Wirral Peninsula, near Liverpool, where wrecking continued to be reported into the early twentieth century.

A 2005 BBC documentary, Coast, successfully replicated the conditions of false light wrecking in an experiment which suggested that a single-candle lantern onshore would be insufficient to lure a boat into dangerous water on a dark night. The boat crew did not see the light until they got within 150m of it.

In 2007 the container ship MSC Napoli went aground off Branscombe beach in Devon. Some of its cargo was washed ashore and many wreckers plundered the cargo in spite of attempts to prevent this. People came long distances to retrieve such things as BMW motorcycles. Goods from wrecks are supposed by law (Merchant Shipping Act 1995) to be reported to the "Receiver of Wreck" and finders may then be given a reward, the penalty for failing to report recovered goods or material within 28 days is £2,500. Wrecks in UK territorial waters are also offered protection under the Protection of Wrecks Act 1973.

In September 2025, Historic England produced new national guidance for authorities dealing with crime associated with shipwrecks.

=== Denmark ===
Wrecking has been practised a long way back in Denmark. The long shorelines, the heavy international marine traffic in combination with some difficult and often harsh waters, has produced many wrecks here. It was only recently, that the light signalling was fully developed and deep sea-bed canals were dug in the often very shallow waters here, making seafaring relatively safe. Skagen's Vippefyr was constructed in 1627, along with several other rudimentary lighting signals in the following years, after complaints. Sea floor canals came centuries later. It was and still is common practice to hire skilled Danish pilots to help navigate in and out of the Baltic Sea.

So-called wreck masters used to be employed in the Danish coastal communities, in order to oversee, report on and collect valuables from new wrecks. A former wreck masters home can be experienced at the Wreck Master's Farm near Rubjerg Knude on the North Atlantic coast for example. The last wreck master here left in 1992. A few wreck masters are still appointed in Denmark, but nowadays the job also includes observations and reporting on oil spills, pollutions, vandalism, etc., and they work in close cooperation with the police.

== Fictional accounts ==
Wreckers have been featured in a number of works of fiction, including references in The Shipping News by E. Annie Proulx, Jamaica Inn by Daphne du Maurier, Shipwrecks by Akira Yoshimura, the film The Light at the Edge of the World based on the novel Le Phare du bout du monde by Jules Verne, and also in the opening chapter of Verne's The Archipelago on Fire.

The plot of Compton Mackenzie's novel Whisky Galore revolves around the inhabitants of a small Scottish island recovering as-yet-untaxed whisky from a shipwreck and their subsequent efforts at evading government officials.

Dame Ethel Smyth's opera, The Wreckers, is set in Cornwall—the plot revolves around deliberate wrecking.

In 1942, the Technicolor Movie Reap The Wild Wind by Cecil B. DeMille depicted life in the wrecking business in the Nineteenth Century around Key West, Florida. It garnered an Academy Award for underwater Special Effects.

In 1962, the Walt Disney's Wonderful World of Color TV series aired a two-episode live action adventure film entitled The Mooncussers about the investigation and exposure of a gang of wreckers.

Enid Blyton, specifically in the Famous Five books, writes often about the treasures of the wreckers.

The Wreckers, by Iain Lawrence, is a book for younger readers about The Isle of Skye (a London vessel) being shipwrecked along the shores of Pendennis, Cornwall.

Canadian progressive rock band Rush included a song on their 2012 album Clockwork Angels titled "The Wreckers", the lyrics of which were inspired by historical tales of wreckers luring ships to their demise.

Crimson Shore is part of the Agent Pendergast series by Douglas Preston and Lincoln Child. The main story involves a ship, the Pembroke Castle, being purposefully wrecked on the rocks off the coast of Massachusetts.

Coot Club, the fifth of Arthur Ransome's Swallows and Amazons series of books, features wreckers on the Norfolk Broads.

The Wreck of the Zanzibar is a Whitbread Award-winning children's novel by Michael Morpurgo, set on the Isles of Scilly.

Canadian folk singer Stan Rogers would sing of wrecking in the song "The Wreck of the Athens Queen", whose subjects "eat a lot of chicken and sit on a couch of green".

== See also ==
- Beachcombing
- Jus naufragii
- Shipwreck
- Ship breaking
