= Indian Key =

Island and state park in Florida, United States

Indian Key, Florida
- Unincorporated community
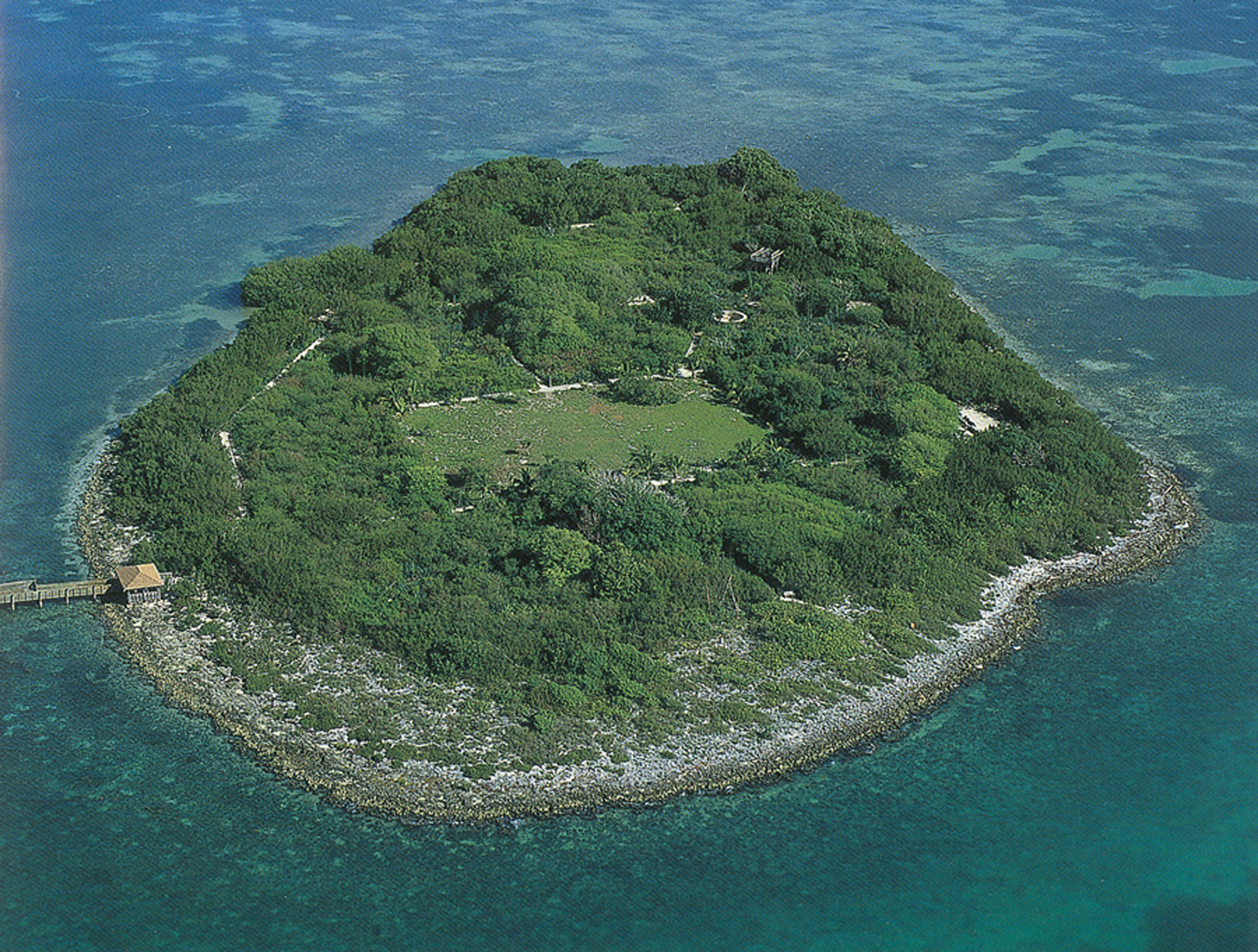
- The island of Indian Key where the settlement was located
- Interactive map of Indian Key, Florida
- Coordinates: 24°52′41″N 80°40′37″W
- Country: United States
- State: Florida
- County: Monroe

Area
  - Total: 0.017 sq mi (0.045 km^{2})

Population (2025)
  - Total: 0
- Time zone: UTC−5 (Eastern (EST))
  - Summer (DST): UTC−4 (EDT)

- Indian Key Historic State Park
- U.S. National Register of Historic Places
- Location within Florida Location within the United States
- Interactive map of Indian Key Historic State Park
- Nearest city: Lower Matecumbe Key, Florida
- Built: 1825
- NRHP reference No.: 72000342
- Added to NRHP: June 19, 1972

Indian Key is an island in the upper Florida Keys off the Hawk Channel passage, in Monroe County, Florida, which was previously part of Miami-Dade County, Florida. In the 19th century, it was an unincorporated community, which later became an uninhabited ghost town. It is currently part of the Florida State Park system, located just a few hundred yards southeast of U.S. 1. It is frequently visited by tourists and is the subject of an archaeological project to uncover the historic building foundations.

The park was listed on the National Register of Historic Places in 1972.

== Early history ==
In 1733, 19 ships of the Spanish treasure fleet were wrecked on the nearby Florida Reef off of Hawk Channel by a hurricane; some of the survivors camped on Indian Key until they were rescued. Beginning in the 18th century, Bahamians and Cubans used Indian Key as a base for fishing, turtling, logging, and wrecking. Crews might stay on the island for months at a time, but there were no permanent settlers.

== Settlement and growth ==
In 1821, Florida was transferred from Spain to the United States; and in 1824, two Key West men, Joshua Appleby and Solomon Snyder, sent an employee, Silas Fletcher, to open a store on Indian Key. The store was to serve wreckers, settlers, and Indians in the upper Keys, and a settlement of primarily Bahamian wreckers and turtlers grew up on the island. By 1829, the settlement was large enough to include a dozen women.

Jacob Housman (or Houseman), a wrecker who had a reputation for operating in a "high-handed and often illegal manner", was at odds with the established wreckers in Key West. He moved to Indian Key in 1830, began buying property on the island, and soon became the leader of the community and its chief landlord. He made numerous improvements to the island, spending close to $40,000 on it in four years. His store, the only one on the island, grossed $30,000 a year. As a result of lobbying by Housman, Indian Key acquired an Inspector of Customs in 1832 and a post office in 1834. In 1836, Houseman persuaded the Territorial Legislative Council to split Dade County off from Monroe County, with the upper and middle Keys in the new county and Indian Key as the temporary county seat. Housman also campaigned to have Indian Key made a port of entry, so that salvage from wrecks could be landed there, rather than in Key West, but without success.

The Second Seminole War began late in 1835. After the New River Massacre in early 1836, most of the Keys were abandoned, except for Key West, Key Vaca, and Indian Key. Despite fears of attack and sightings of Indians in the area, the inhabitants of Indian Key stayed to protect their property and to be close to any wrecks in the upper Keys. The islanders had six cannons and their own small militia company for their defense. (The militia company initially included six slaves; by August 1836 half of the 20-man company were blacks.) The revenue cutter Dexter was based at Indian Key for part of 1838, and after it was withdrawn ships of the Navy Florida Squadron called at Indian Key and established a supply depot there. In 1840, the Navy supply depot was moved to nearby Tea Table Key.

== Indian raid and subsequent decline ==
Early in the morning of August 7, 1840, a large party of "Spanish Indians", (Note: The ethnic composition of the "Spanish Indians" is unclear. Sturtevant states that the "Spanish Indians" may have been a group of Mikasuki-speakers who had entered southern Florida earlier than other groups who became known as "Seminoles", and had close relations with the Spanish.) led by Chakaika, snuck onto Indian Key. The group was spotted and an alarm was raised. Most of the 50 to 70 people living on the island were able to escape, but 13 were killed. The dead included Dr. Henry Perrine, former United States Consul in Campeche, Mexico, who was waiting at Indian Key until it was safe to take up a 36 sq mi (93 km^{2}) grant on the mainland that Congress had awarded to him.

The naval base on Tea Table Key had been stripped of personnel for an operation on the southwest coast of the mainland, leaving only the doctor, his patients, and five sailors under a midshipman to look after them. This small contingent mounted a couple of cannons on barges and tried to attack the Indians on Indian Key. The Indians fired back at the sailors with musket balls loaded in one of the cannons on shore. The cannons' recoil on the barges broke them loose, sending them into the water, and the sailors had to retreat. The Indians burned the buildings on Indian Key after thoroughly looting them. Abandoned by almost all of its civilian population, Indian Key was taken over by the Navy for the duration of the Second Seminole War.

Indian Key continued to be occupied for a while after the Second Seminole War ended in 1842. The county seat for Dade County was moved to Miami in 1844, and the upper Keys, including Indian Key, were returned to Monroe County. The 1850 Census found a few families living there, while only two families were left on the island in 1860. In 1856, during the Third Seminole War, the U.S. Army stationed a few men on the island to protect the two remaining families from possible attack by Seminoles. The Keys lost most of their population again during the Civil War, but William Bethel, a wrecker, continued to live on the island from the 1850s until sometime after 1880.

== Fishing camp and Florida state park ==
Following its abandonment as a permanent settlement in the nineteenth century, Indian Key saw only intermittent use as a fishing camp and excursion destination during the twentieth century. By the early 1900s, a handful of seasonal cabins had been erected, while visitors stopped at the island for picnics or while traveling to the nearby Alligator Reef Light. Botanist John Kunkel Small, visiting the island in 1921, found only masonry foundations, cultivated tropical plants (including descendants of the sisal introduced by Henry Perrine) and abandoned fishing cabins, noting that the original grave markers had disappeared. Two operators of the Indian Key Fishing Camp were killed in the 1935 Labor Day hurricane, and subsequent visitors, including archaeologist John M. Goggin in 1944, described the island as overgrown, with ruined cisterns and a few remaining structures. The last cabins were destroyed by Hurricane Donna in 1960, leaving the island uninhabited.

In 1971, the State of Florida acquired Indian Key and established Indian Key Historic State Park to preserve its archaeological remains and historical significance. The park was listed on the National Register of Historic Places on June 19, 1972. The park is managed jointly with the Lignumvitae Key Botanical State Park, the Shell Key Preserve State Park, and the San Pedro Underwater Archaeological Preserve State Park. The island has since been managed as a state historic site, with interpretive programs and, beginning in 1976, periodic heritage festivals celebrating its role in the history of the Florida Keys.

== Sources ==
- Buker, George E. (1975). Swamp Sailors: Riverine Warfare in the Everglades 1835–1842. Gainesville, Florida: The University Presses of Florida. ISBN 0-8130-1514-6.
- Dodd, Dorothy (1948). "Jacob Housman of Indian Key" (PDF). Tequesta. 8: 3–20. Archived from the original (PDF) on June 23, 2010 – via Digital Collections Florida International University.
- Knetsch, Joe (2003). Florida's Seminole Wars 1817–1858. Charleston, South Carolina: Arcadia Publishing. ISBN 0-7385-2424-7.
- Viele, John (1996). The Florida Keys: A History of the Pioneers. Sarasota, Florida: Pineapple Press, Inc. ISBN 1-56164-101-4.
- Viele, John (2001). The Florida Keys: The Wreckers. Sarasota, Florida: Pineapple Press, Inc. ISBN 1-56164-219-3.
