= Eli Ayers =

American physician

Eli Ayers (May 9, 1778 – April 25, 1822) was a medical doctor and the first colonial agent of the American Colonization Society in what later became Liberia. He was born in 1778 in Shiloh, New Jersey, and married Elizabeth West in 1812. He practiced medicine in Woodbury, New Jersey. On August 7, 1821, he left New York for West Africa on USS Shark. Together with Robert F. Stockton of USS Alligator he extorted a treaty under duress with six tribal kings on the purchase of land at Cape Mesurado. He served as the colonial agent of the American Colonization Society from December 15, 1821, until his death on April 25, 1822.
