= Ajax Reef =

Coral reef in the Florida Keys, US

- Location within Florida Location within the Caribbean

Location
- Location: Caribbean
- Coordinates: 25°24′00″N 80°08′00″W
- Country: United States

Geology
- Type: reef

Ajax Reef is a natural coral reef located within the Florida Keys National Marine Sanctuary and also within Biscayne National Park. Unlike many reefs within the National Marine Sanctuary, this reef is not within a Sanctuary Preservation Area (SPA). It is north of Pacific Reef.
