= Alligator Reef Light =

Lighthouse in Florida, US

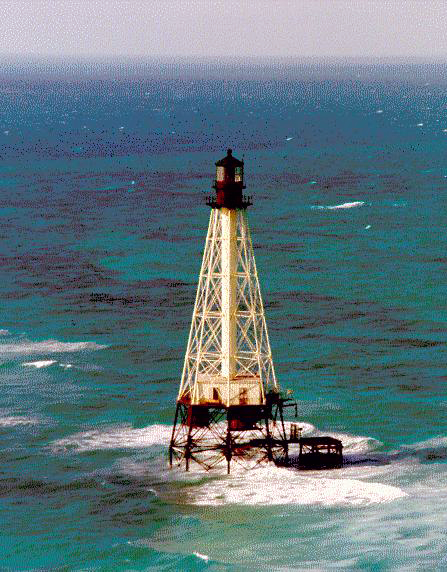
- Alligator Reef lighthouse, date unknown
- Location: 3.5 nautical miles; 6.4 kilometres (4 mi) east of Indian Key near the Matecumbe Keys; Florida; United States
- Coordinates: 24°51′6.43″N 80°37′7.86″W

Tower
- Foundation: Iron piles with platform
- Construction: Wrought iron skeleton framework tower
- Automated: 1963
- Height: 136 feet (41 m)
- Shape: Octagonal pyramidal tower enclosing stair cylinder, keeper's dwelling on a platform, balcony and lantern
- Markings: White tower and keeper's dwelling, black lantern and pile foundations
- Power source: solar power
- Operator: United States Coast Guard
- Heritage: National Register of Historic Places listed place
- Racon: "G" (Golf)

Light
- First lit: 1873
- Deactivated: 2015
- Focal height: 136 feet (41 m)
- Lens: First order bivalve Fresnel lens (1873) (original), VRB-25 aerobeacon (1997) (current)
- Range: White: 16 nautical miles (30 km; 18 mi) red: 13 nautical miles (24 km; 15 mi)
- Characteristic: Fl (4) W 60s. (2 red sectors) 0.2s fl 9.8s ec. 0.2s fl 9.8s ec. 0.2s fl 9.8s ec. 0.2s fl 29.8s ec. Red from 23° to 249° and 047° to 068°.
- Alligator Reef Light
- U.S. National Register of Historic Places
- NRHP reference No.: 11000860
- Added to NRHP: December 1, 2011

Alligator Reef Light is located 4 nautical miles (7.4 km; 4.6 mi) east of Indian Key, near the Matecumbe Keys of Florida in the United States, north of Alligator Reef itself. The station was established in 1873. It was automated in 1963 and was last operational in July, 2014, and is being replaced by a 16' steel structure with a less powerful light located adjacent to it. The structure is an iron pile skeleton with a platform. The light is 136 feet (41 m) above the water. It is a white octagonal pyramid skeleton framework on black pile foundation, enclosing a square dwelling and a stair-cylinder. The lantern is black. The original lens was a first order bivalve Fresnel lens. The light characteristic of the original light was: flashing white and red, every third flash red, from SW by W 1/2 W through southward to NE 1/8 E, and from NE by E 3/4 E through northward to SW 3/8 S; flashing red throughout the intervening sectors; interval between flashes 5 seconds. It had a nominal range of 14 nautical miles (26 km; 16 mi) in the white sectors and 11 nautical miles (20 km; 13 mi) in the red sectors. The new light has a range of approximately 7 nautical miles (13 km; 8.1 mi).

It is listed as number 980 in the USCG light lists.

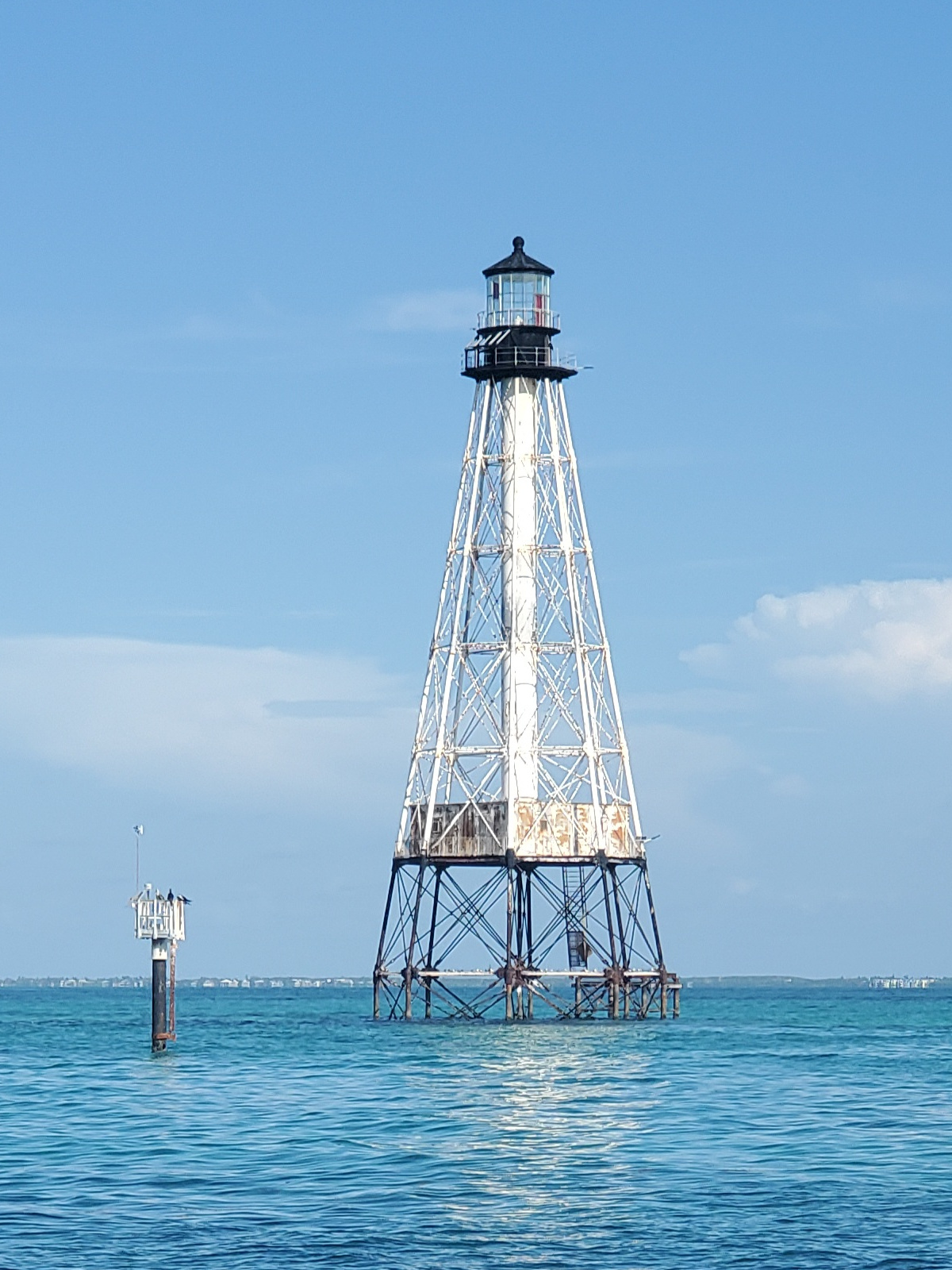
Alligator Reef Light in 2023

== Historical information ==
The name honors the U.S. Navy schooner Alligator, part of the U. S. Navy Anti-Piracy Squadron that had recently been established in Key West, which went aground at this location in 1822. The Alligator was blown up after removing as much as possible from it to prevent it from being used by pirates. Countless vessels have also sunk here on the reef's jagged coral. This lighthouse cost $185,000 to build at that time. To support the tower, a 2,000 lb (900 kg) hammer was used to drive the 12 inches (300 mm) iron pilings ten feet (3.0 m) into the coral.

== Current situation ==
On February 1, 2019, it was announced that the lighthouse would be given away freely to any government agencies, educational agencies, non-profit corporations, or any community development organizations who wanted to use it for "educational, park, recreational, cultural or historic preservation purposes." This is in accordance with the National Historic Lighthouse Preservation Act.

Friends of the Pool, a community organization based in Islamorada, was granted title to the lighthouse in 2021. The group changed its name to Save Alligator Lighthouse and raised $6 million to restore the lighthouse. Solar-powered lights were installed and illuminated in October 2023.

== See also ==
- List of lighthouses in Florida
- List of lighthouses in the United States

== Bibliography ==
- "Historic Light Station Information and Photography: Florida". United States Coast Guard Historian's Office. Archived from the original on May 1, 2017.
- Dean, Love (1982). Reef Lights: Sea swept Lighthouses of the Florida Keys. Key West, Florida: The Historic Key West Preservation Board. ISBN 0-943528-03-8.
