= Hen and Chickens (reef) =

Coral reef in the Florida Keys, US

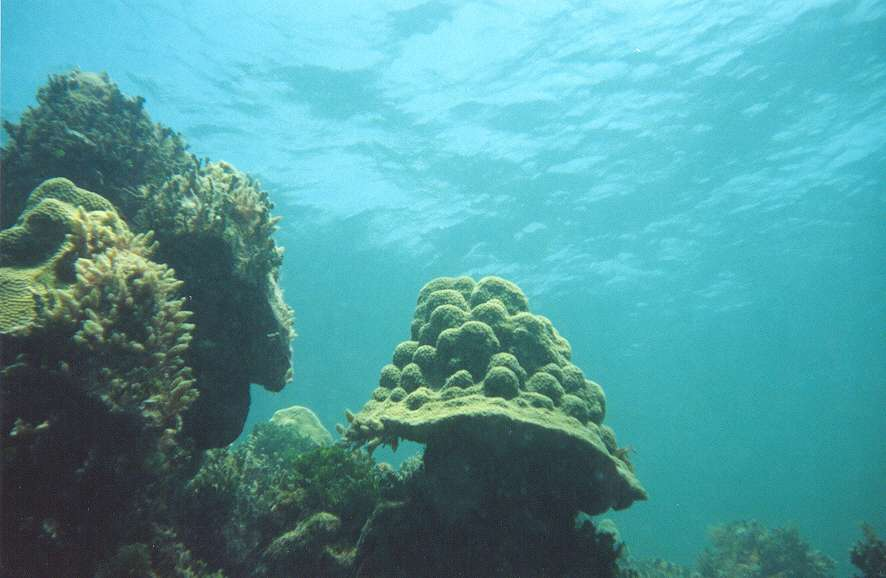
- A Montastraea coral at Hen and Chickens reef in 1999.

- Location within Florida Location within the Caribbean

Location
- Location: Caribbean
- Coordinates: 24°56′07″N 080°32′55″W
- Country: United States

Geology
- Type: reef

Hen and Chickens is a shallow coral reef located within the Florida Keys National Marine Sanctuary. For a while in the 20th century it was marked by the Hen and Chickens Shoal Light. It lies to the southeast of Plantation Key. This reef lies within a Sanctuary Preservation Area (SPA).
