= Alligator Reef =

Coral reef in Florida, United States

- Location within Florida Location within the Caribbean

Location
- Location: Caribbean
- Coordinates: 24°50′50″N 080°37′11″W
- Country: United States

Geology
- Type: reef

Alligator Reef is a coral reef located within the Florida Keys National Marine Sanctuary. It lies to the southeast of Upper Matecumbe Key. This reef lies within a Sanctuary Preservation Area (SPA).

== Name ==
Alligator Reef is named for the USS Alligator, a ship assigned to suppress the trade of slaves coming from the African coast in the 1820s. In November 1822, the Alligator was escorting a convoy of merchant ships when she ran aground on the shallow reef. Despite efforts to save the damaged ship, the United States sank her to prevent pirates from pillaging the remains of the boat. The Alligator Reef Light sits on Alligator Reef. A wreck traditionally considered as the remains of USS Alligator is located 200 feet southwest of the lighthouse and can be seen by snorkelers and divers year-round; however a 1996 expedition has challenged this identification, and the wreck is probably that of another 19th c. ship.

== Protection ==
The protected reef is located four nautical miles offshore and is trademarked by the black and white lighthouse present within the reef. Four yellow buoys designate the perimeter of the reef; as anchoring in the SPA is forbidden, there are several buoys in the SPA for mooring boats. Anchoring on the reef is not allowed unless the anchor is fixed to the sandy bottom, as an anchor placed on the reef itself can damage and kill the coral. Tourists venture to the reef daily to relax in the serenity the reef provides. With a variety of aquatic species present, this reef is ideal for beginning snorkelers and divers; some parts of the reef lie at a depth of only eight feet. Many local dive and snorkel boats venture to the reef to provide guided instruction for beginners.

The status of a protected reef restricts any removal of aquatic life. Fishing of any kind is not permitted within the reef and the removal of any coral, sand, shells, or any form of life is prohibited.

== Gallery ==
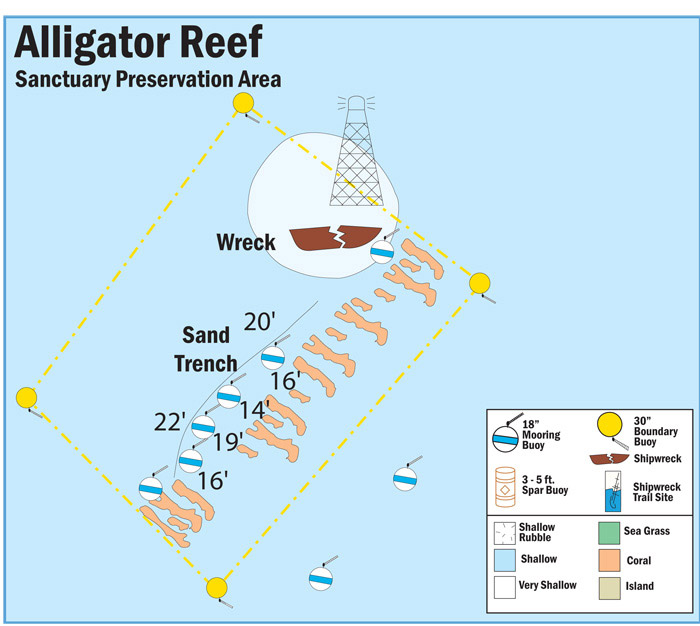
NOAA map of Alligator Reef

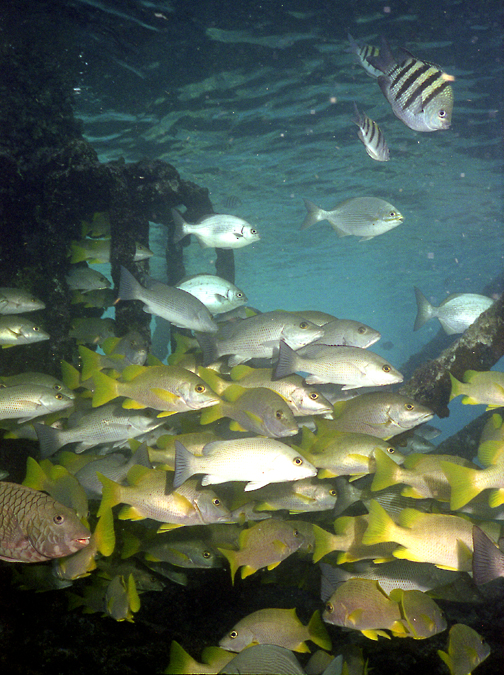
Fish beneath the Alligator Reef Light in 2006

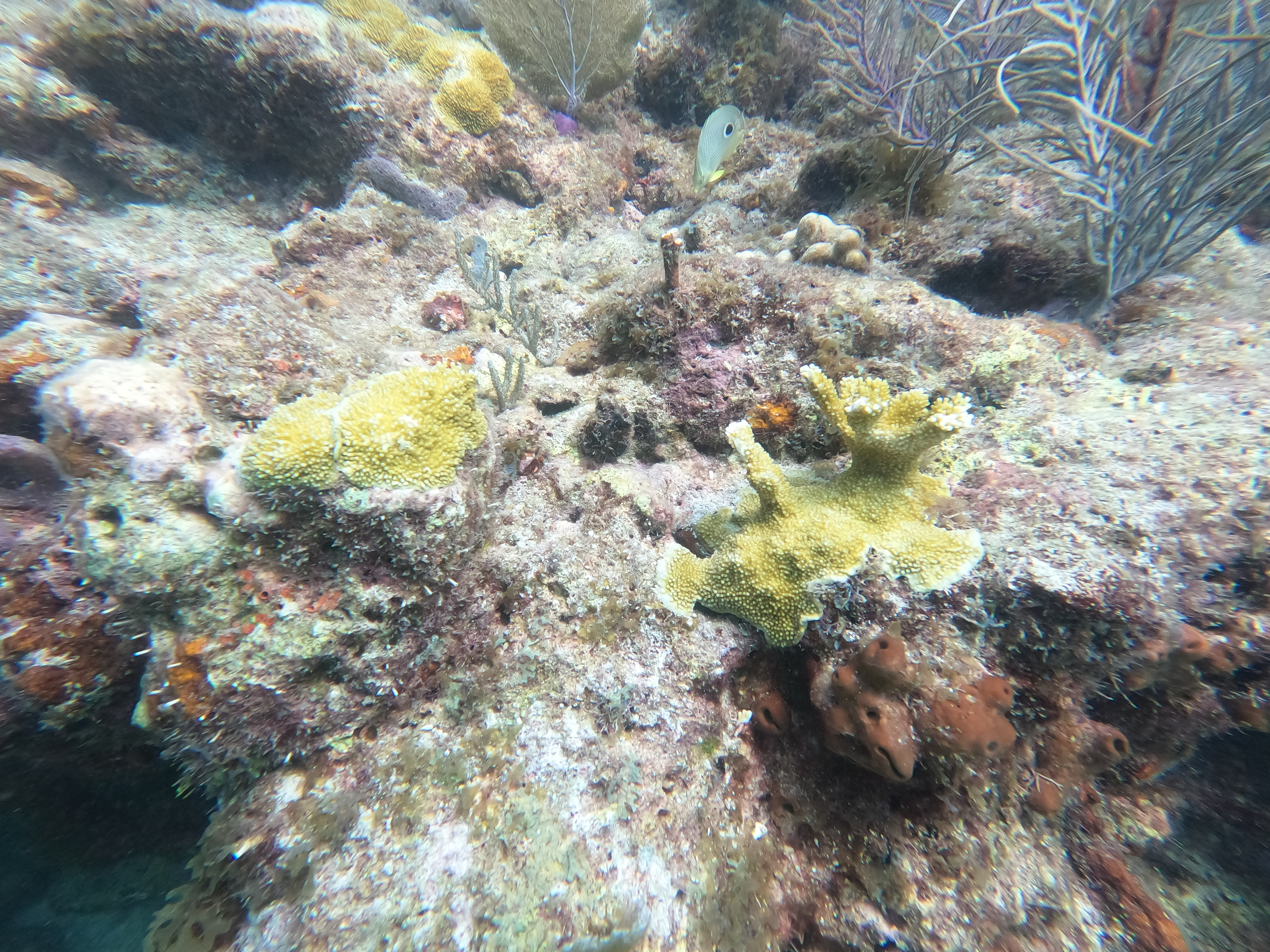
Reintroduced Elkhorn coral at Alligator Reef in 2023

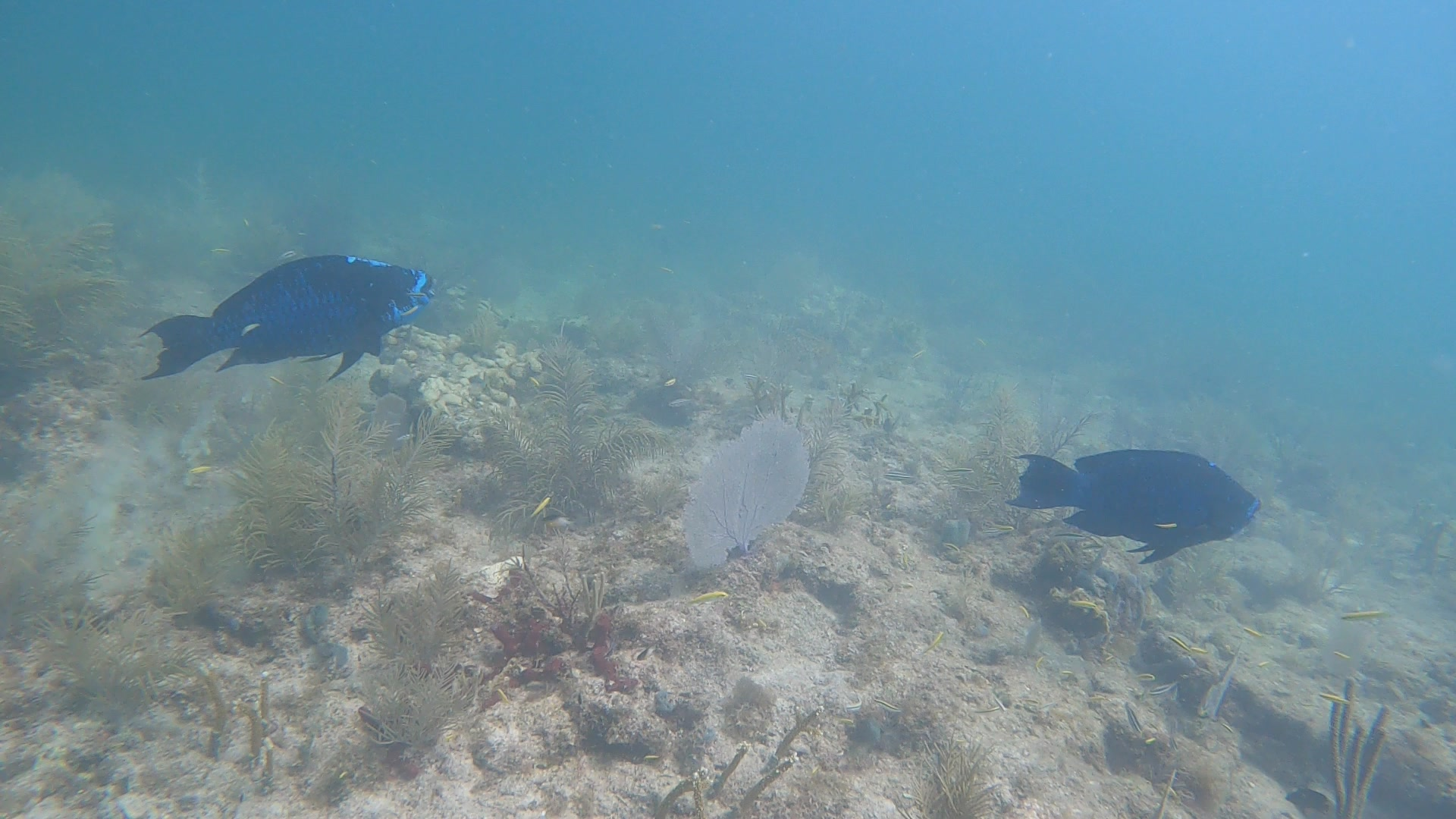
Two Midnight parrotfish in 2023

== See also ==
- Action of 9 November 1822
