= Tennessee Reef =

Coral reef in the Florida Keys, US

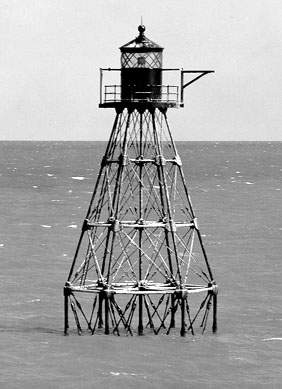
- Tennessee Reef Light in 1966

- Location within Florida Location within the Caribbean

Location
- Location: Caribbean
- Coordinates: 24°46′N 80°45′W
- Country: United States

Geology
- Type: reef

Tennessee Reef is a coral reef located within the Florida Keys National Marine Sanctuary. It lies to the southeast of Long Key. It consists of drowned (deep) spur-and-groove reef. Much of the reef is within a designated "Research Only" zone.

An unmanned reef light is located near the reef.
