= Pacific Reef =

Coral reef in the Florida Keys, US

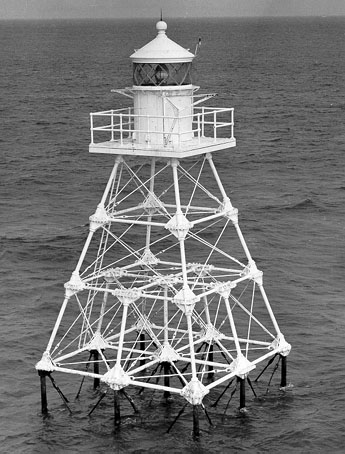
- Pacific Reef Light

- Location within Florida Location within the Caribbean

Location
- Location: Caribbean
- Coordinates: 25°22′15″N 80°08′30″W
- Country: United States

Geology
- Type: reef

Pacific Reef is a coral reef located within the Florida Keys National Marine Sanctuary and also within Biscayne National Park. Unlike many reefs within the National Marine Sanctuary, this reef is not within a Sanctuary Preservation Area (SPA). It is south of Ajax Reef.

The Pacific Reef Light is still operational at Pacific Reef.
