= Sombrero Key Light =

Lighthouse in Marathon, Florida, United States

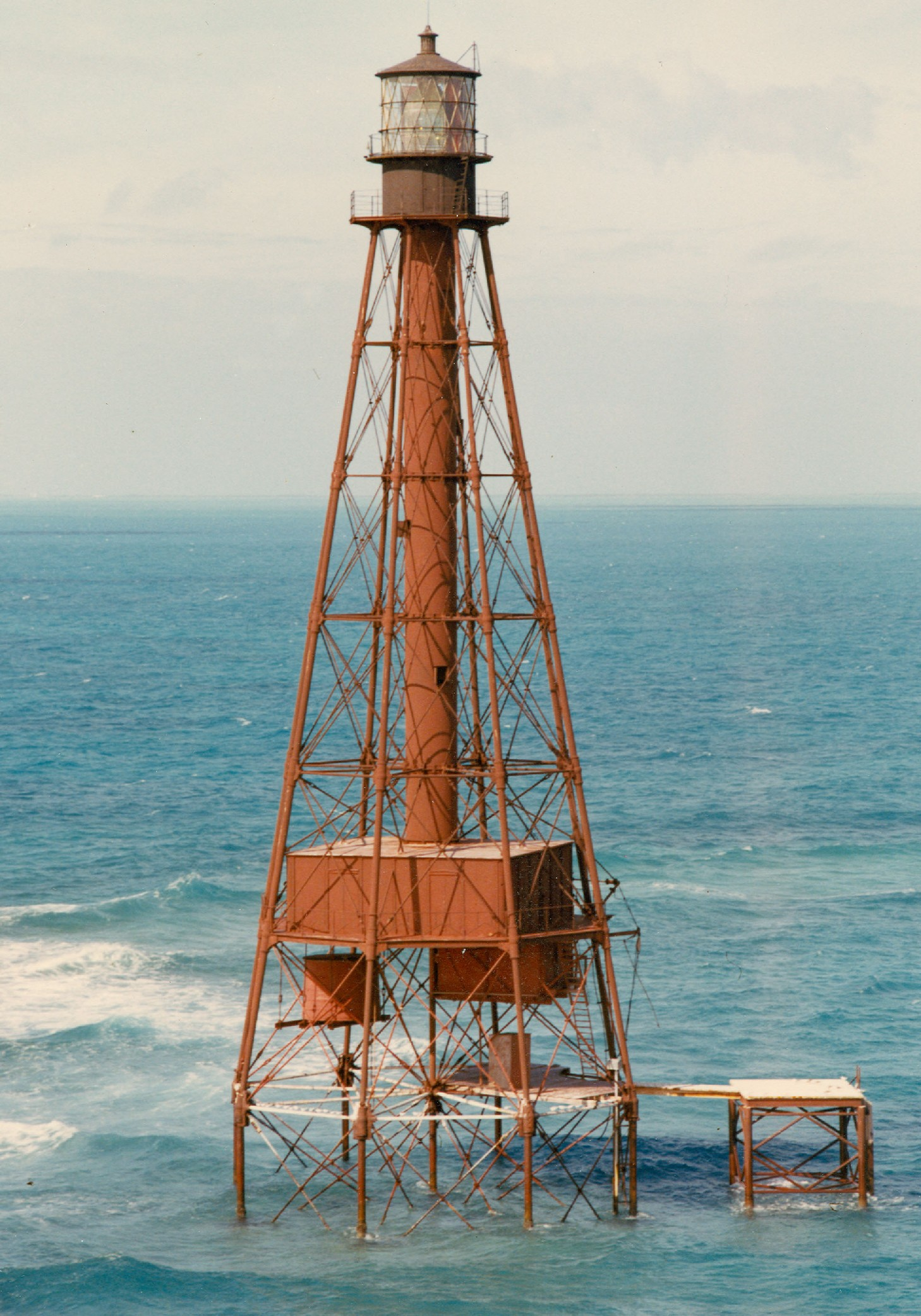
- Sombrero Key Light (from U.S. Coast Guard archives)
- Location: near Key Vaca in Marathon, Florida
- Coordinates: 24°37′40.46″N 81°06′41.78″W

Tower
- Foundation: iron pilings with disks
- Construction: cast iron
- Automated: 1960
- Height: 142 feet (43 m)
- Shape: skeletal octagonal pyramid
- Heritage: National Register of Historic Places listed place
- Racon: "M" (— —)

Light
- First lit: 1858
- Deactivated: 2015
- Lens: first-order Fresnel lens
- Range: White 15 nautical miles (28 km; 17 mi), Red 20 nautical miles (37 km; 23 mi)
- Characteristic: Fl(5) W 60s
- Sombrero Key Light
- U.S. National Register of Historic Places
- Location within Florida
- Location: Offshore approx. 5.5 mi. SSW. of Marathon
- Nearest city: Marathon, Florida
- Coordinates: 24°37′40.46″N 81°06′41.78″W
- MPS: Light Stations of the United States MPS
- NRHP reference No.: 12000092
- Added to NRHP: March 9, 2012

Sombrero Key Light is located offshore of Vaca Key in Marathon, Florida. The lighthouse is located on a mostly submerged reef. The name Sombrero Key goes back to the Spanish, and old charts show a small island at the spot, but by the later 19th Century the island had eroded, with some parts of the reef exposed at low tide. As a result, the reef and the lighthouse have also been called Dry Banks.

The lighthouse was put in service in 1858, automated in 1960, and was deactivated in 2015. The foundation is iron pilings with disks, and the tower is a skeletal octagonal pyramid of cast iron. It is a 142-foot (43 m) tall red painted tower. It has two platforms. The lower one, 15 feet (4.6 m) above the water, held water and fuel tanks, the generator (after the light was electrified), boat hoists and a workshop. The upper platform, 40 feet (12 m) above the water, held the quarters for the staff. The original lens, a first-order Fresnel lens, is now on display in the Key West Lighthouse Museum. The Sombrero Key Light is the tallest lighthouse in the Florida Keys, and was the last lighthouse constructed under the supervision of Lieutenant George Meade of the Bureau of Topographical Engineers.

== Keepers ==
- Joseph Bethel 1858 – 1859
- Joseph F. Papy 1859 – 1860
- Anthony Davis 1860 – 1862
- James Bryson 1862 – 1864
- John H. Singleton 1864 – 1866
- John Carroll 1866 – 1870
- Peter Crocker 1870 – 1872
- Adolphus A. Seymour 1872 – 1873
- Jeremiah Buckley 1873 – 1881
- Thomas J. Pinder 1881 – 1884
- Melville Evans Spencer 1884 – 1889
- Rudolph Rieke 1889 – 1904
- John Watkins 1904 – 1913
- Miguel Fabal 1913 – 1919
- William H. Pierce 1919 – at least 1933
- Edward P. Johnson 1936 – 1941
- Furman C. Williamson 1958 –1960

== Availability ==
On February 1, 2019 it was announced that the lighthouse would be given away freely to any government agencies, educational agencies, non-profit corporations, or any community development organizations who wanted to use it for "educational, park, recreational, cultural or historic preservation purposes." This is in accordance with the National Historic Lighthouse Preservation Act. If none request it, then it will be auctioned off to anyone else who does.

On February 13, 2022 the lighthouse was listed for auction on GSAAuctions.gov with an opening bid of $15,000. On May 16, 2022 the lighthouse was sold for $575,000.
