= Turtling (hunting) =

Hunting of turtles

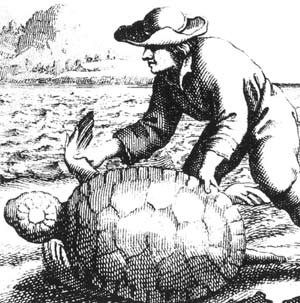

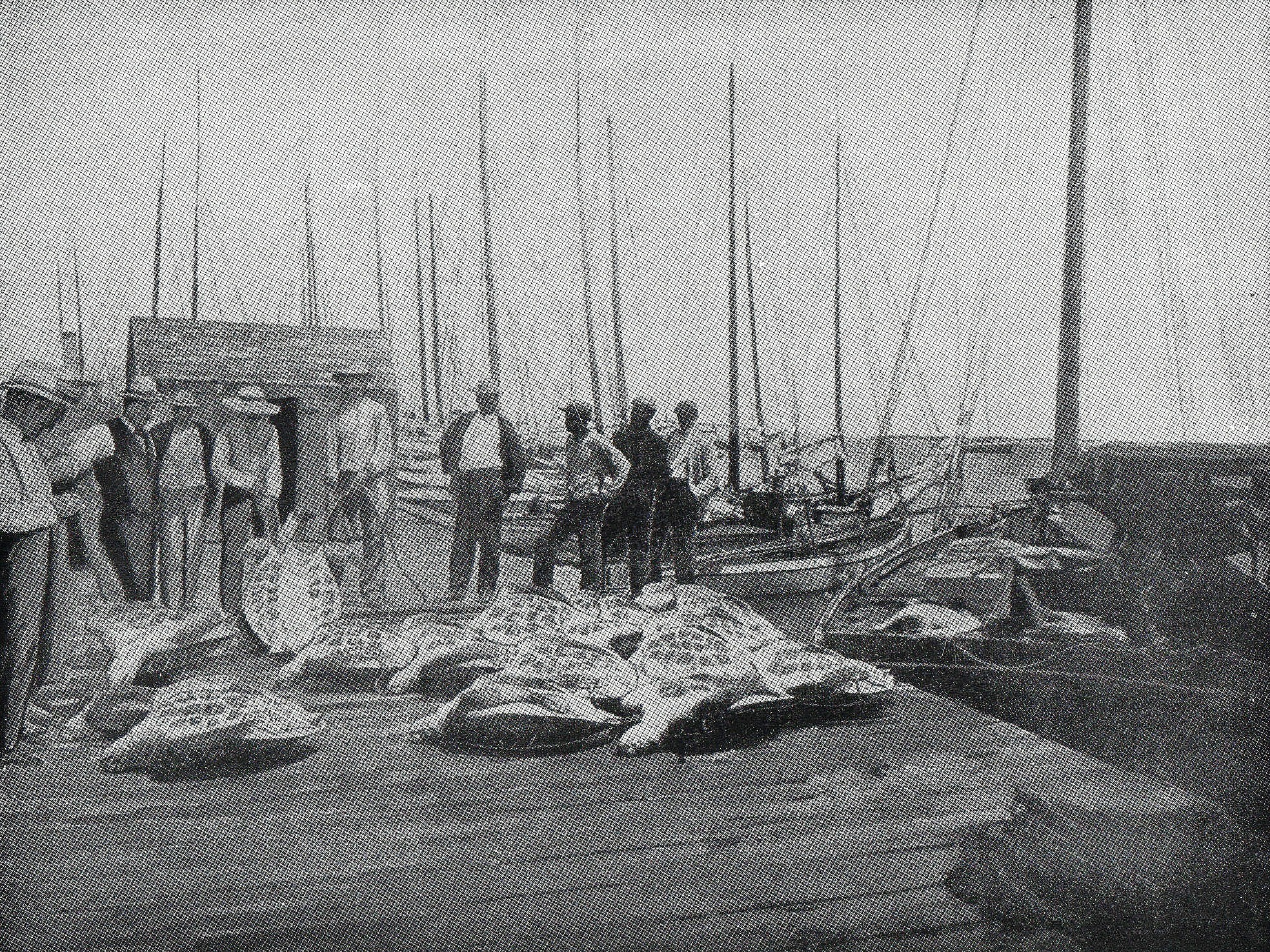

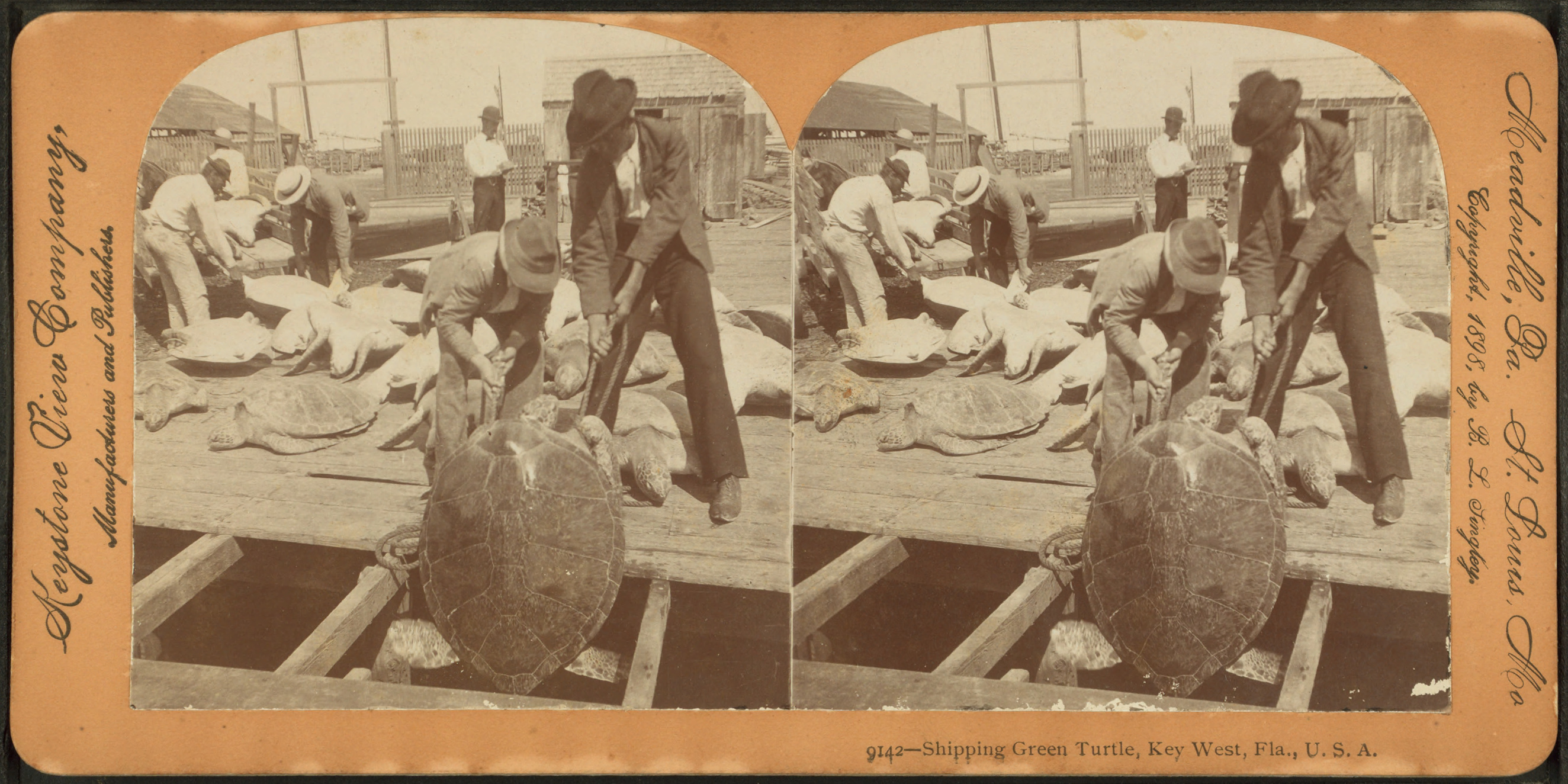

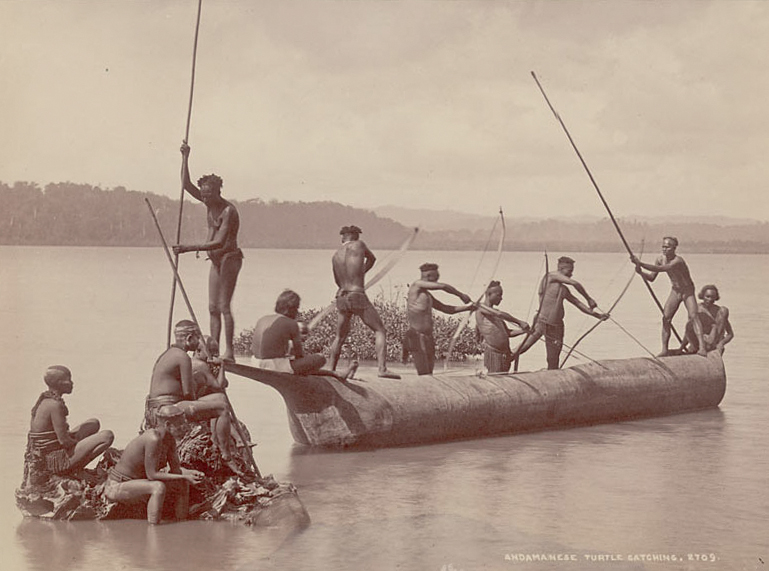
Group of Andamanese people hunting turtles with bows and arrows.

Turtling is the hunting of turtles. Turtling has been a part of human culture since as far back as the middle of the first millennium BC, where sea turtles such as the hawksbill sea turtle (Eretmochelys imbricata) were eaten as delicacies in countries such as China. While consumption and hunting of turtles is less common than it was in the past, this practice is still a part of communities throughout the globe, whether done legally or illegally.

== History ==
In Melanesian societies, it was common during funeral ceremonies, for locals to partake in a feast of turtle meat and other delicacies. The deceased were sealed into a tomb, and several years later it was tradition to reopen the tomb and to indulge once more on turtle meat. Because turtle meat was relatively rare, hunting the turtle for others during this time was considered to be a display of public generosity. While turtle hunting within this culture is not as common as it was decades ago, locals on Murray Island, Australia, continue to hunt green sea turtles (Chelonia mydas) during the turtle mating season. The turtles are pursued by groups of 3-6 hunters, where a leader, around one decade older than the other members of the group, uses a harpoon to kill the 100–150 kg turtle.

Ecological research shows that turtle numbers decline with proximity to human settlements. This can be explained directly due to the hunting of turtles, or also indirectly with the ecology of fear principle, predation.

== Species at risk ==
While there are several turtle species at risk, the loggerhead sea turtle (Caretta caretta), which made the IUCU endangered animals list in 1996, and the leatherback sea turtle (Dermochelys coriacea) which has been experiencing a decline in numbers, are both still being hunted or killed due to human impact. Another turtle species that can be hunted (not commercially) while considered as special concern at the Canadian and Ontarian level is the snapping turtle (Chelydra serpentin). Hawksbill sea turtles have been hunted for their shells primarily to make jewelry. Tourists will often buy items without being informed of the source of the material. Green sea turtles eggs are poached and eaten in many countries; this is also a tourist attraction and taking sea turtle shots, consuming raw turtle egg with whiskey or beer is popular in places like Costa Rica.

== Fishing bycatch ==
Capturing turtles as a byproduct of fishing has been recognized as a severe threat to turtle populations. It has been acknowledged that fishing nets are the most devastating of fishing equipment to turtles, whether turtles are hunted intentionally or not.

== By region ==
=== Australia ===
In Australia it is estimated that 326 turtles from 6 different species, including the flatback sea turtle (Narator depressa) accounting for 59% of captures, and the hawksbill sea turtle accounting for 5%, were captured between 1989 and 1990.

=== Africa ===
With a coast line of approximately 30,000 km, it is evident that Africa relies greatly on the fishing industry to feed the people and also as a trade product between other countries. It is estimated that in Africa, an average of 180 turtles are caught per year using fishing hooks alone. Capture rate of turtles using a standard fishing hook is approximately 16 in 100,000. A sixteenth of the captured turtles are leatherback sea turtles, a species of turtle in which population numbers are declining. Conservation ecologists have estimated that should fishing efforts increase and fishing distribution remain the same, these numbers will increase to 770 turtles per year, threatening risked species of turtle.

=== Madagascar ===
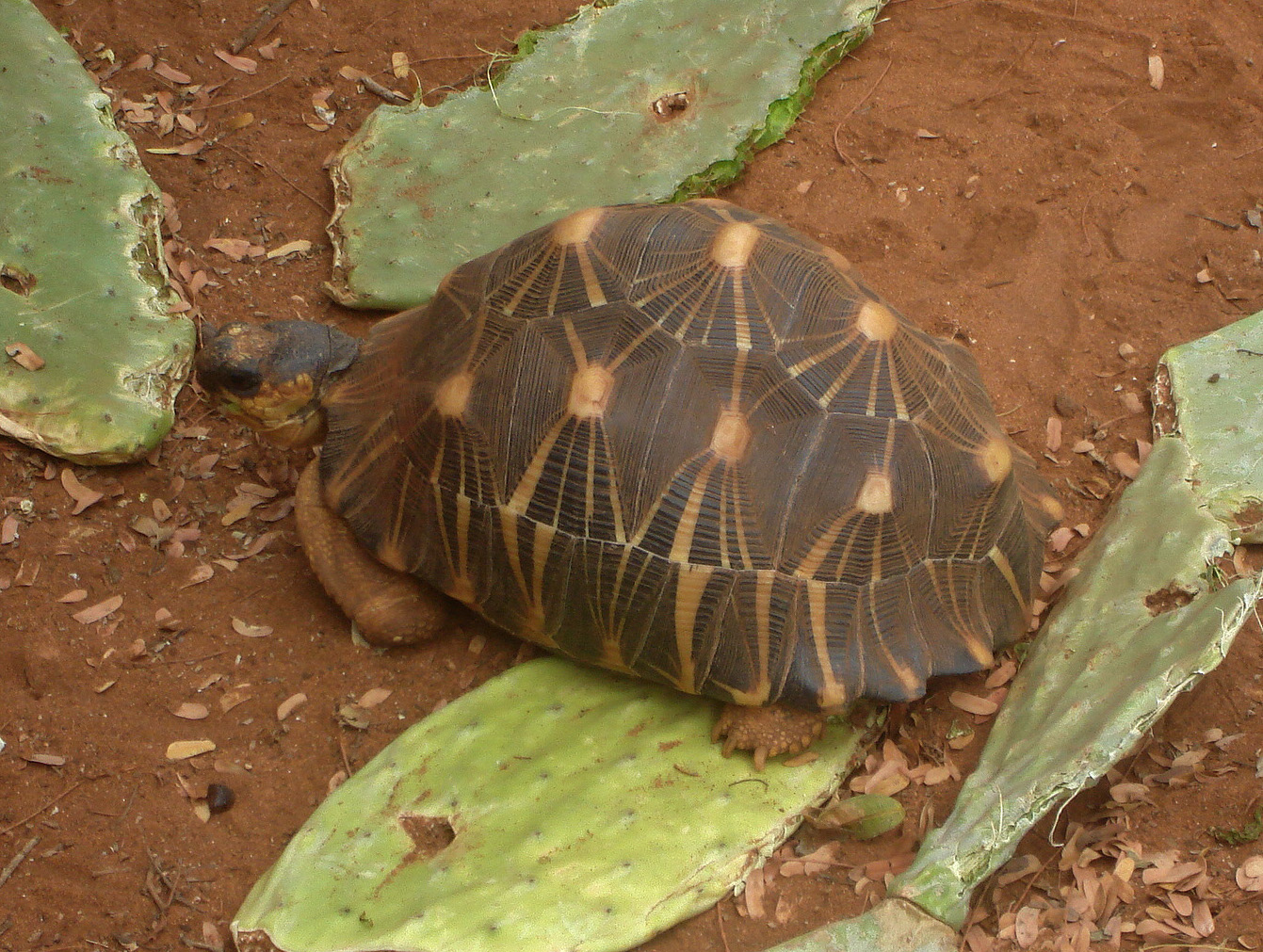
The radiated tortoise is in decline in Madagascar.

The radiated tortoise (Geochelone radiata) in Madagascar is in serious decline due to over-exploitation. The tortoise is protected under Malagasy law and is part of CITES, however enforcement is low and hunting persists. Guards that are meant to protect the tortoise and prevent hunting are often paid off by the hunters.

=== Mexico ===
In Mexico sea turtles have been used for medicine, food and decoration since the 13th century. While hunting turtles is strictly forbidden in Mexico, approximately 35,000 turtles have been poached per year within the last decade around Baja California Sur. An estimated 65% of captured turtles are thought to be green sea turtles, while 10% consist of the endangered loggerhead sea turtle. The most common way poachers capture turtles is using a net designed specifically for turtles, which costs around $660. The majority of the poachers are local fisherman, who earn approximately US$78 per week. The turtles are sold locally, or reach the international black market where they fetch a profit of US$58 per turtle.

The maximum punishment in Mexico for the poaching of turtles is nine years in jail and a fine of US$11,000. Poachers told researchers that the most efficient way of avoiding being caught is to either physically avoid patrols by driving away from them, or by paying a bribe.

=== North American regulations on turtle hunting ===
Both the American and Canadian governments regulate the consumption, hunting and destruction of turtles and their eggs.

In Canada, it is illegal to hunt or kill turtles in most provinces. Ontario allowed snapping turtle hunting as recently as 2016, but that was discontinued in 2017.

In the US, some states have imposed bans on collecting turtles from the wild, including for their meat.

Turtle hunting in New York State regulates two species of turtles, the diamondback terrapin and the snapping turtle. Snapping turtles are allowed to be hunted only between July 15 and September 30. A small game hunting license is required to hunt the turtle, and it is mandated that the turtle shell must be 12 inches long, or longer in a straight line. Turtles must be killed with a bow or firearm, and there is a limit of 30 turtles per year. Because of risk of food-borne contaminants, health advisories have been implemented with specific cooking instructions for public health.

Similarly to regulation of snapping turtles, diamondback terrapin turtles are only allowed to be hunted during specific months of the year. The hunting season for diamondback terrapin turtles is from August 1 to April 30. In order to hunt diamondback terrapins, individuals must possess a hunting license specific to the species of turtle. Shells must be between 4 and 7 inches long, and must be released if the shell size is any different. Diamondback terrapin turtles must be captured by dip nets, seine nets, by hand or with a trap that must be checked on a daily basis.

== Regulating poaching ==
One of the most difficult obstacles to overcome with the hunting and poaching of sea turtles is the cultural aspect. Many countries, such as Costa Rica, have been hunting and eating sea turtles and sea turtle eggs for a very long time and consider it to be part of their culture. When scientists and conservationists try to explain to native poachers the detrimental impact their actions have on sea turtle populations, or when walking nightly patrols on the beach, they are met with hostility and sometimes violence. Continuous education and outreach is important to mitigating the issue, in addition to beach patrols to prevent poachers from taking eggs or nesting female turtles. Implementing laws that protect animals, such as the radiated tortoise in Madagascar, can help population levels if proper enforcement is in place.

== See also ==
- Animal welfare
- Dolphin safe label
