= Sand Key Light =

Lighthouse southwest of Key West, Florida, United States

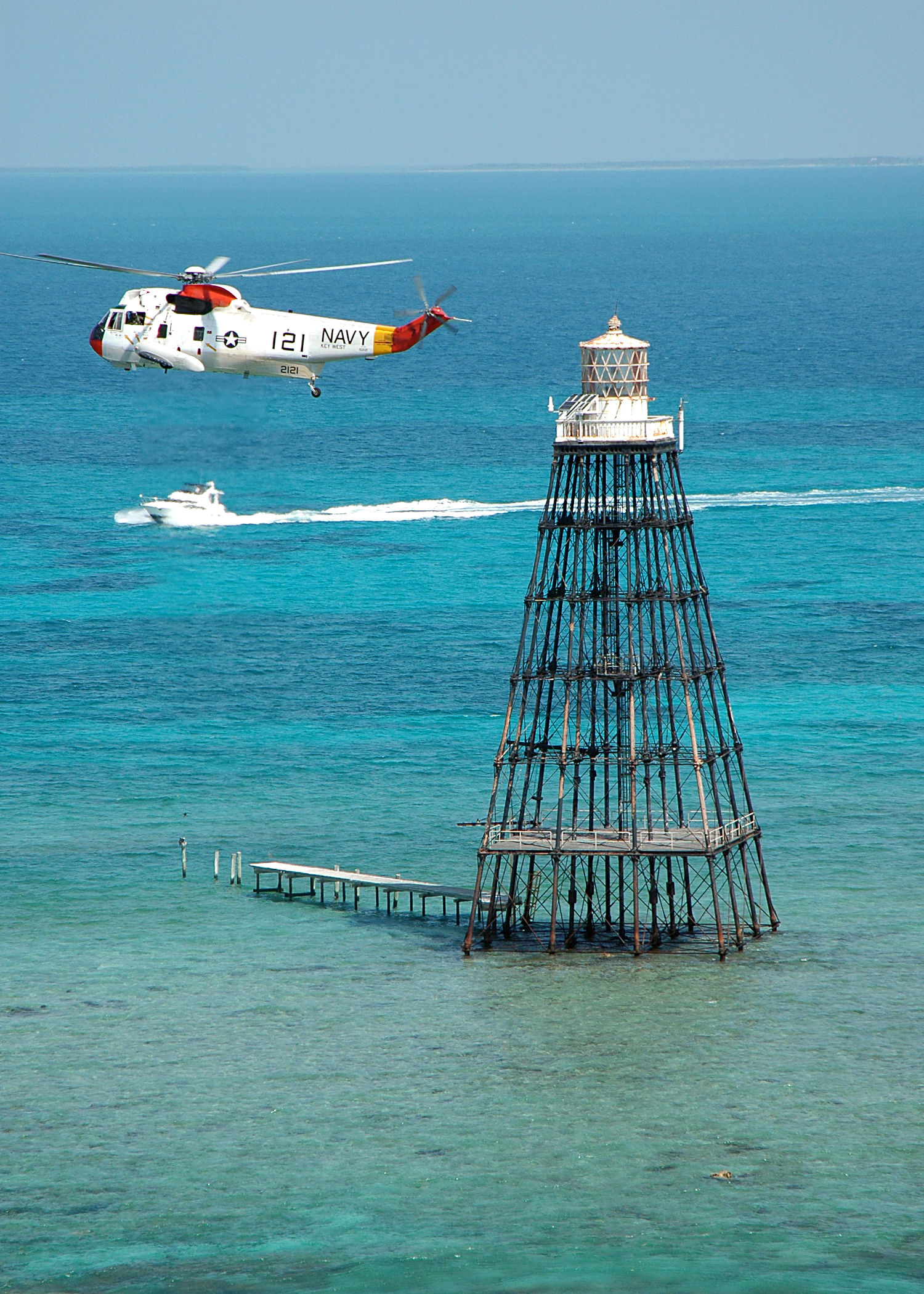
- Sand Key Light, 2005
- Location: southwest of Key West, Florida
- Coordinates: 24°27′14″N 81°52′39″W

Tower
- Constructed: 1827
- Foundation: cast iron screw piling
- Construction: cast iron
- Automated: 1938
- Shape: square pyramidal skeletal tower
- Heritage: National Register of Historic Places listed place
- Racon: "N" (— ∘)

Light
- First lit: 1853
- Deactivated: 2015
- Focal height: 109 feet (33 m)
- Lens: first order Fresnel lens
- Range: White 14 nautical miles (26 km; 16 mi), Red 11 nautical miles (20 km; 13 mi)
- Characteristic: Flashing (2) white 15s with red sectors
- Sand Key Lighthouse
- U.S. National Register of Historic Places
- Area: less than one acre
- Architect: J.W.P. Lewis, John F. Riley Ironworks
- Architectural style: Iron Screw Pile Lighthouse
- NRHP reference No.: 73000589
- Added to NRHP: April 11, 1973

Sand Key Light is a lighthouse 6 nautical miles (11 km; 6.9 mi) southwest of Key West, Florida, between Sand Key Channel and Rock Key Channel, two of the channels into Key West, on a reef intermittently covered by sand. At times the key has been substantial enough to have trees, and in 1900 nine to twelve thousand terns nested on the island. At other times the island has been washed away completely. The light marks the southernmost point of the Hawk Channel passage along the Florida Keys.

== Early history ==
The first navigational light on Sand Key was a 60-foot (18 m) brick tower built in 1827. After the first keeper, John Flaherty, died in 1830, his widow Rebecca took over the job. In 1844 a hurricane eroded part of the island, destroyed the keeper's house, and damaged the seawall. The 1846 Havana hurricane toppled the tower, killing the light keeper and five others. (Note: Sources contradict. The United States Coast Guard Historian's Office says that "Rebecca Flaherty was keeper for 16 years following the death of her husband in 1830. The Great Havana Hurricane in 1846 eroded the sand ... killing Rebecca Flaherty and five others", a story which is repeated in several sources, e.g., Dean and McCarthy. On the other hand, the Historian's Office lists the keepers as "Rebecca Flaherty (1830-?), Captain Frederick Neill (? – 1836), Captain Francis Watlington (1836-1837), Captain Joshua Appleby (1837-1846 – killed)" suggesting Flaherty was long gone by 1846. This is supported by Taylor which puts Captain Frederick Neill as Flaherty's second husband, and them leaving Sand Key in 1836.)

== Reconstructions and renovations ==
As the Key West Light had also been destroyed in the same storm, a ship, the Honey, was acquired and outfitted as a lightship to serve as the Sand Key Light until new lighthouses could be built. Due to efforts to reorganize the Lighthouse Board, Congress was slow to appropriate funds for the new lighthouses.

A screw-pile foundation for a new light on Sand Key was begun in 1852. Funds ran out before the foundation was complete, and the contractor had to wait seven years for final payment. Later that year Lieutenant George Meade, who had completed construction of the Carysfort Reef Light, was placed in charge of construction of the Sand Key Light. The light tower was completed in 1853. This light was the first to use the hydraulic lamp designed by George Meade.

The screw-pile foundation and open framework tower allowed the lighthouse to survive later hurricanes, including one in 1856 that completely washed away all of the island above water. The light was automated in 1938. In 1967 the first order Fresnel lens was removed and replaced by a fourth order lens. That in turn was removed in 1982 and replaced with a flash tube array. The tower was severely damaged in a fire in 1989, and the light was moved to a nearby temporary structure. An attempt was made to restore the structure of the tower in 1995, but the keeper's quarters were demolished in 1996. The light was returned to the tower in 1998. The light was deactivated in 2015, and was auctioned by GSA Auctions in 2020 for US$83,000.

== Gallery ==
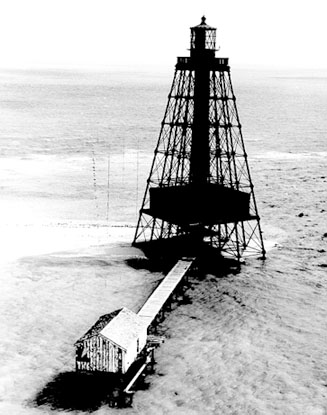
U.S. Coast Guard Archive

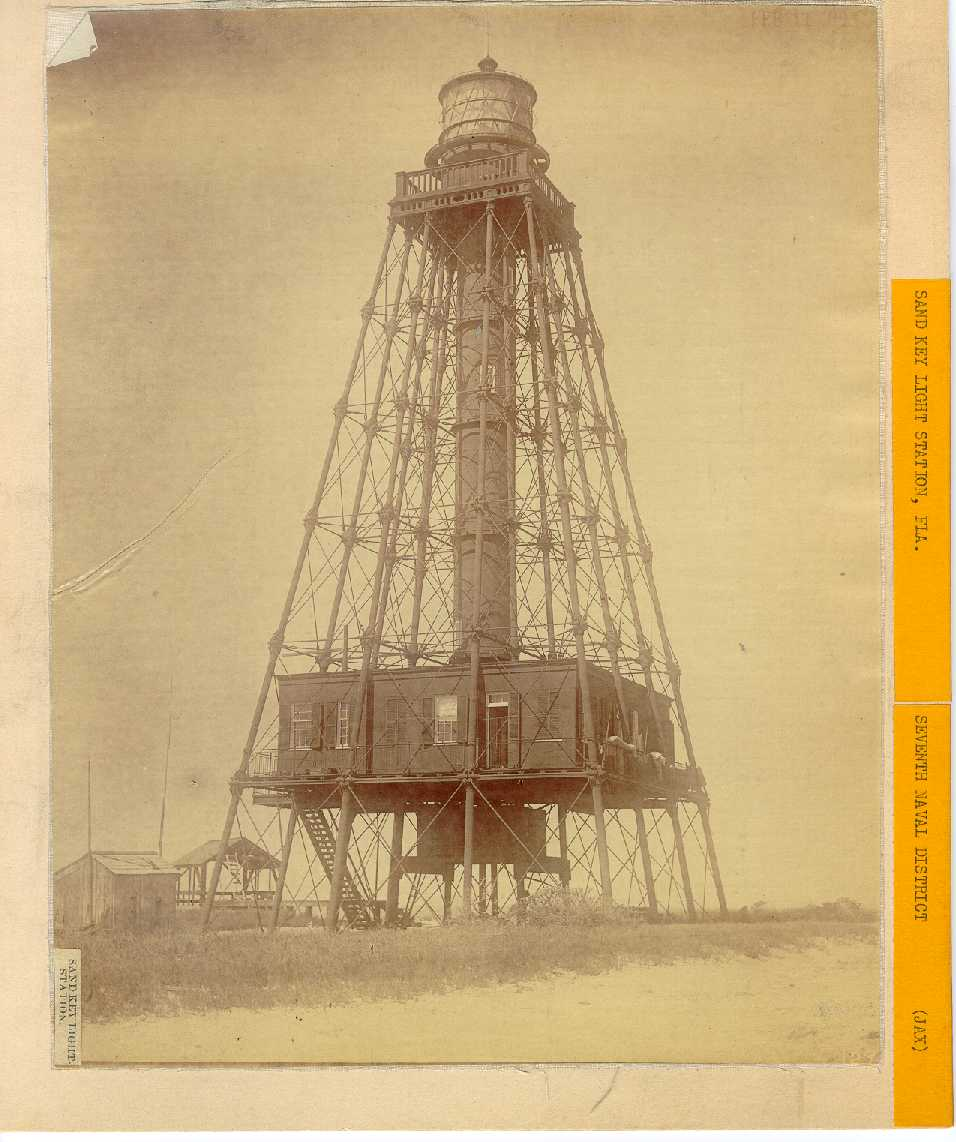
Keeper's quarters intact

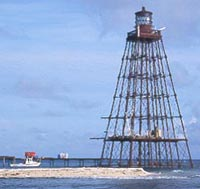
In 1996 after the keeper's quarters were demolished

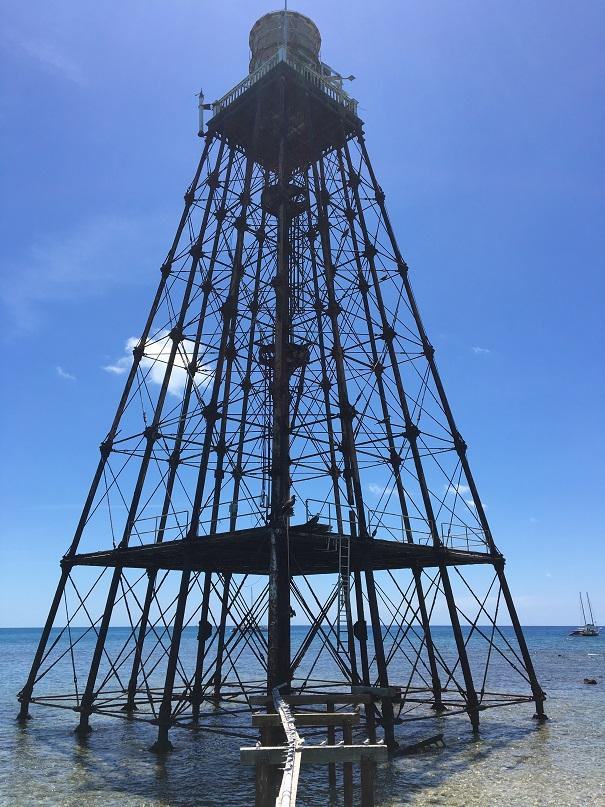
In 2019, Photo used for the auction
