= West Indies anti-piracy operations of the United States =

- Part of Piracy in the Caribbean
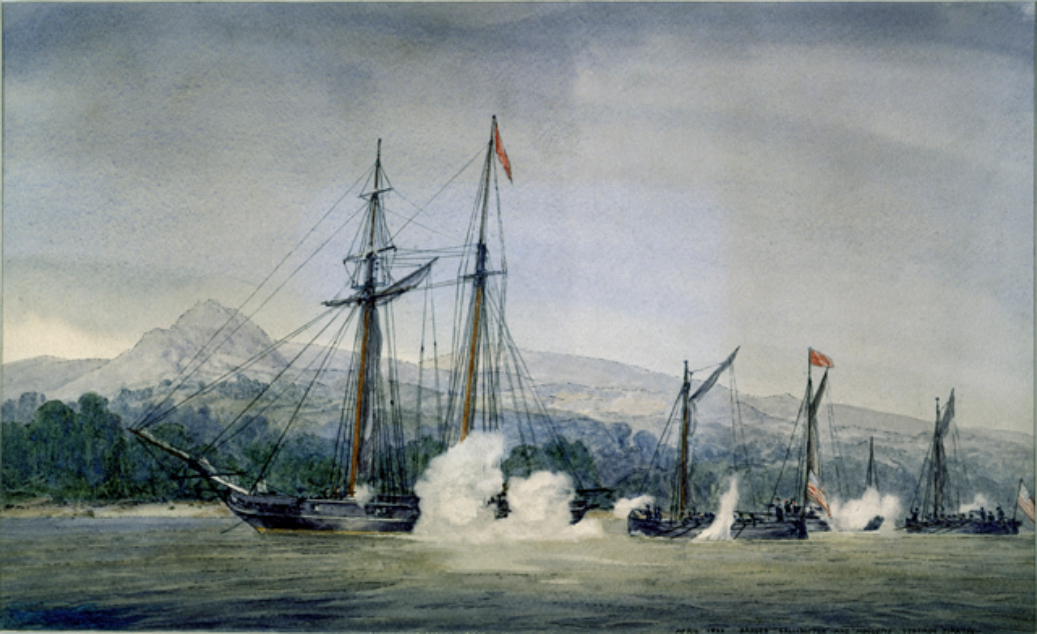
- American barges USS Gallinipper and USS Mosquito attacking a pirate ship off Cuba, April 1823
Date	1814–1825
Location	West Indies, Caribbean Sea, Gulf of Mexico
Result	Allied victory

Belligerents
United States; United Kingdom; Denmark; Spain	Caribbean pirates

Commanders and leaders
(United States) James Biddle; (United States) William H. Crawford; (United States) David Porter; (United States) Jairus Loomis	Renato Beluche; Roberto Cofresi (executed); Diabolito (executed); Jean La Farges (executed); Charles Gibbs (executed); Jean Lafitte †; Pierre Lafitte #; Louis-Michel Aury †; Dominique Youx

Strength
2 frigates 2 corvettes 2 sloops of war 2 brigs 4 schooners 2 cutters 2 gunboats 1,346 sailors and marine infantry	Unknown

The United States naval forces undertook a series of military campaigns and engagements to combat piracy in and around the Antilles from 1814 to 1825. During that time, the U.S. West Indies Squadron pursued pirates on both sea and land, focusing primarily on key regions such as The Bahamas, Cuba, and Puerto Rico. A range of privateers, hailing from the United States to Denmark, also participated in the conflict.

== Operations ==
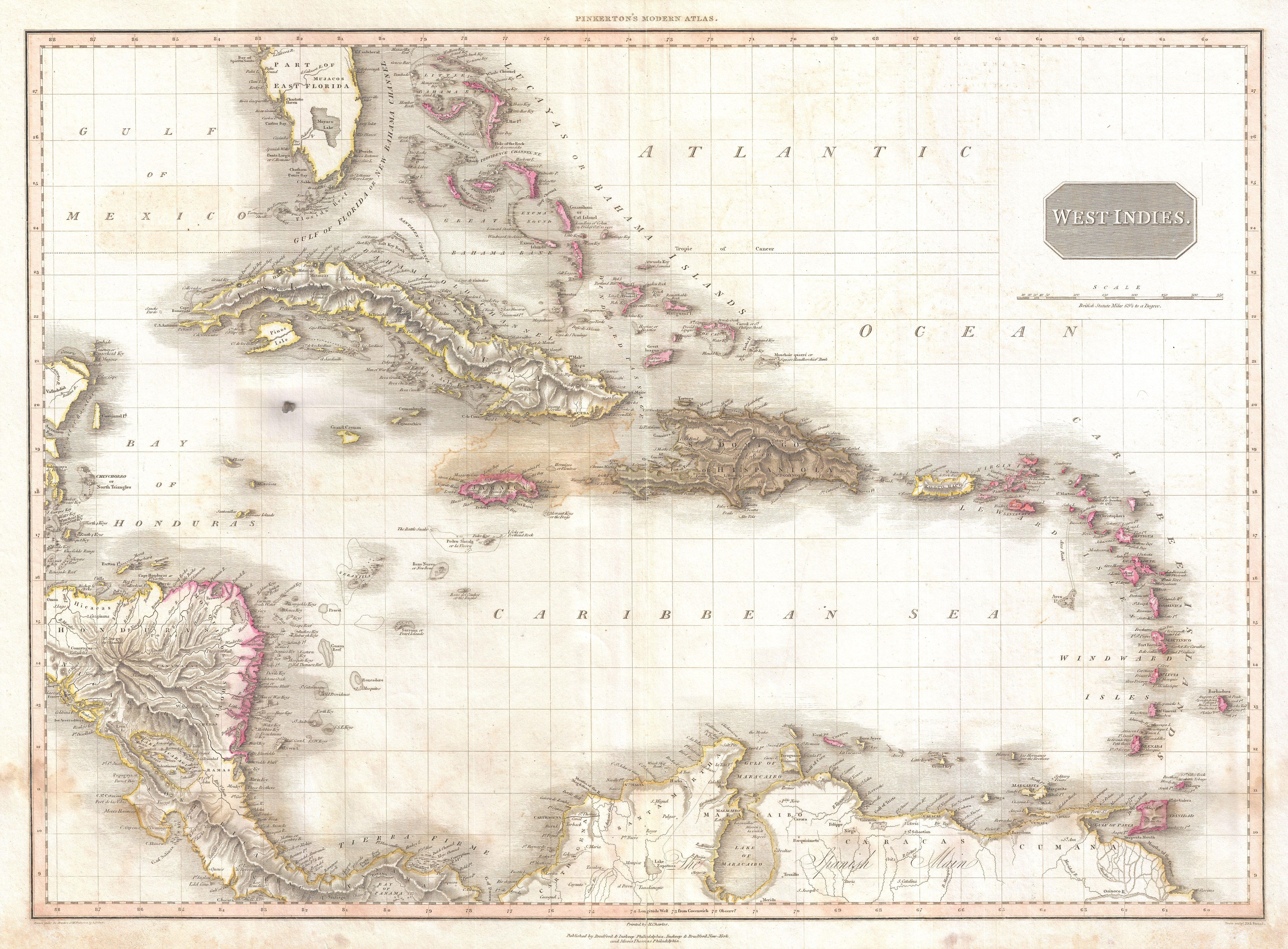
Map of early 1800s West Indies

United States Navy and U.S. Revenue Marine cutter ships had operated against piracy and the slave trade in the Caribbean and Gulf of Mexico for several years prior to 1822 when a permanent squadron was formed. After a September 1821 attack by pirates, in which three American merchant ships were captured, Congress authorized Commodore James Biddle to deploy a fleet to the Caribbean. This force consisted of two frigates, USS Macedonian and USS Congress, two corvettes, USS Cyane and USS John Adams, two sloops-of-war, USS Hornet and USS Peacock, two brigs, USS Spark and USS Enterprise, the schooners USS Grampus, USS Alligator, USS Shark and USS Porpoise. Gun schooners from the revenue marine USRC Alabama and USRC Louisiana, as well as two other revenue marine gunboats, No. 158 and No. 168, also participated with a total of over 1,500 personnel. Before the fleet was sent, only single ship operations had been undertaken. Over the course of a few decades the American West Indies Squadron continually engaged Spanish, Venezuelan, Cuban and Puerto Rican pirates. Many of the actions ended with the sinking or capturing of pirate vessels though often the outlaws escaped to shore. After the capture of Roberto Cofresi and his sloop Anne in 1825, acts of piracy became rare, and the operation was considered a success, although limited occurrences went on until slightly after the start of the 20th century.

=== 1817–1821 ===
During and after the Spanish American wars of independence, Spanish naval power in the Caribbean Sea and Gulf of Mexico weakened, allowing for a resurgence of piracy along the Gulf Coast. Many of the pirates in the period were Latin Americans and doubled as privateers. Revolution against Spain was widespread and both the rebel governments and the Spanish issued letters of marque. Often the privateers captured American merchantmen and attacked their crews which resulted in them being branded as pirates.

=== Revenue Marine Service ===
Revenue cutters were dispatched to fight the pirates early on. The first anti-piracy action from the Revenue Marine Service occurred back in 1793 when the cutter Diligence ran a pirate vessel ashore in the Chesapeake Bay. After the success, revenue cutters were charged with suppressing piracy and protecting the shores of America. In 1819, the cutter ships USRC Alabama and USRC Louisiana as well as two gunboats joined the first established anti-piracy U.S. Naval fleet. The ships fought major engagements with pirates, on the open sea, and a notable Battle of Breton Island. On 1818 June 22, boarding parties from the Revenue cutter Dallas seized the privateer Young Spartan, her crew, and the privateer's prize, the Pastora, off Savannah, Georgia. The crew of the Pastora had been set adrift, and their fate remained unknown. The New York Evening Post noted that the crew of the privateer had committed offenses "that can only be expiated by making their exits on the gallows."

The Revenue cutter Active captured the pirate vessel India Libre in the Chesapeake Bay on July 18, 1818. On August 31, 1819, the Bravo led by pirate captain Jean Le Farges' vessel engaged cutters Louisiana and Alabama off the coast of Florida. The cutters' crews boarded the enemy and took the ship in a hand-to-hand struggle. Le Farges, a lieutenant of Jean Lafitte, was later hanged from Louisiana's yardarm.

On 19 July 1820, Alabama and Louisiana captured four pirate ships off La Balize. USRC Louisiana and USS Peacock manned with several cutter men would engage HMS Speedwell, Alabama engaged pirates again, which resulted in the taking of five more pirate ships. This campaign was the beginning of the anti-piracy, coastal defense, and maritime law enforcement mission which is still practiced in the modern U.S. Coast Guard today.

=== Navy engagements ===
The first American Navy vessels to serve against West Indies piracy were the schooners USS Enterprise, USS Nonsuch and USS Lynx were among the vessels deployed between 1817 and 1822. All of these ships operated independently and there was no commander of the squadron until its official establishment. In 1819 President James Monroe sent Commodore Oliver Hazard Perry to Venezuela with the frigate USS Constellation, the corvette USS John Adams and USS Nonsuch. The commodore's orders were to demand restitution for the capture of American merchant ships by Venezuelan privateers and to receive an assurance that the privateers would be restrained from attacking again. Perry was successful in completing his mission initially and a treaty was signed on August 11, though on his cruise back to the United States, he died of yellow fever at Trinidad which caused the agreement to fail. On December 22, 1817, USS John Adams forced the filibuster Louis-Michel Aury to evacuate his base at Amelia Island, Florida. Later, John Adams was flagship of Commodore Biddle's squadron.

By 1820, hostilities with the pirates and privateers started to increase, United States warships engaged in several naval actions that year and a total of twenty-seven American merchant ships were captured. In Between 1818 and 1821, USS Enterprise captured thirteen pirate and slave ships while serving with the New Orleans station (US Navy) and later in the West Indies. On October 24, 1819, while under command of Lieutenant J. R. Madison, USS Lynx captured two pirate schooners and two boats in the Gulf of Mexico and on November 9, she captured another pirate boat in Galveston Bay. Lynx disappeared in January 1820 while sailing to Jamaica, she likely sank due to a storm, none of her crew were ever seen or heard from again. In October 1821, while sailing off Cape Antonio, Cuba, USS Enterprise came to the assistance of three merchantmen which had been seized by four pirate craft. Boats were launched and attacked the brigands, in the end, over forty pirates were killed or captured and two of their vessels taken. A month later, Enterprise attacked a pirate base near Cape Antonio and cleared the area criminals. In September 1821, three American merchant ships were massacred off Matanzas, Cuba. The crew of one ship was tortured and the vessel was set on fire, survivors were able to escape to shore in a boat. Three men were killed on the second American ship and everyone on the third vessel which was also burned. This incident was one of the main reasons why the anti-piracy operation was continued. USS Hornet captured a privateer schooner named Moscow on October 29, 1821, and on December 21, she captured a pirate ship apparently without a fight and the crew escaped to shore.

On December 16, 1821, Lieutenant James Ramage in USS Porpoise was sailing off Cape Antonio and found five enemy vessels, including the merchant brig Bolina. Forty sailors were lowered into five boats and Ramage led the advance. Though some of the pirates fled to shore, many resisted and the five American boats destroyed the five pirate ships by burning them. They also freed the Bolina. Three pirates were captured and several killed according to reports. In autumn of 1821, USS Spark, under Lieutenant John Elton, departed Boston and joined the list of vessels assigned to counter piracy. In January 1822, Elton captured a Dutch flagged pirate sloop. Seven prisoners were taken to Charleston for trial, Spark then returned to the Caribbean and remained on station for the next three years by which time the official West Indies Squadron was formed.

=== 1822–1823 ===
Three significant engagements occurred between the pirates and British ships in 1822 and 1823. In March, boat crews from USS Enterprise captured two launches and four boats in a creek near Cape Antonio and on March 6, they seized eight more craft and over 150 pirates. A British merchantman under Captain William Smith was captured by Spanish pirates from the schooner Emanuel in July 1822. The pirates made Smith walk the plank and when he attempted to swim away they shot him in the back. Also on the ship was Smith's fourteen-year-old son, whose head was crushed by the pirate captain when he could no longer stand to hear him crying. USS Grampus encountered the brig Palyrma flying Spanish colors on August 15, 1822. Commanding Lieutenant Gregory suspected the ship to be a pirate so he approached to board but as Grampus drew near, Palyrma opened fire and a brief three and a half minute battle was fought. After boarding the wrecked vessel, the pirates were found to be from Puerto Rico and had a letter of marque that was intended to get the outlaws out of a situation like this. The letter was found to be fake so the pirates were detained and handed over to the Spanish in Cuba. At this time the usual procedure for dealing with captured pirates was turning them over to Spain because the United States didn't have the authority to imprison them.

The United States Navy could not pursue the pirates on Spanish soil either so in April 1822, Commodore David Porter, in USS Macedonian, assumed command of the station and one of his first missions was to consult with Governor Captain General Don Nicholas Mahy of Cuba and the governor of Puerto Rico. Both governors denied Porter's request to allow American shore parties to land but at the same time the United States government permitted the West Indies Squadron to do so but only in remote areas. Commodore Porter then attacked and destroyed a pirate force at Funda Bay, Cuba between September 28 and 30, 1822. Also on September 28, Peacock captured a boat filled with pirates about sixty miles (97 km) from Havana, and later that afternoon, USS Peacock encountered the merchant vessel Speedwell which had been attacked by pirates two hours before. In response, Captain Stephen Cassin launched a boat expedition which captured four schooners but again most of the pirates escaped. On September 30, 1822, the twenty-six gun HMS Tyne was escorting a one-gun merchant sloop Eliza when attacked by a five-gun pirate felucca named Firme Union. During the ensuing engagement, the British boarded and captured the pirate ship. Ten pirates were killed and the rest abandoned ship and escaped. On November 2, 1822, USRC Louisiana along with USS Peacock and the Royal Navy schooner HMS Speedwell captured five pirate vessels off Havana. On November 8, 1822, Lieutenant William Howard Allen of USS Alligator was killed in battle while leading an attack against three enemy schooners which were holding five merchantmen hostage. In the action, two of the schooners were captured and at least fourteen pirates were killed. Due to Lieutenant Allen's death, Secretary of the Navy Smith Thompson authorized Commodore Porter to procure new vessels for the squadron.

Porter acquired eight new shallow draft schooners, five large barges, a steam powered riverboat and a storeship schooner. The schooners were each armed with three guns and became the USS Beagle, USS Ferret, USS Fox, USS Greyhound, USS Jackal, USS Terrier, USS Weasel, and the USS Wild Cat. The storeship was USS Decoy and the steamer became USS Sea Gull. The new squadron left the United States for Cuba on February 15, 1823. Commodore Biddle also received new orders of conduct: he was now able to land shore parties in populated areas as long as he informed the locals first. Biddle was also ordered to cooperate with any other sovereign naval forces operating against pirates. HMS Grecian of six guns captured the eight-gun schooner La Cata on March 1, 1823, south of Cuba. Thirty brigands were killed in action and only three were taken prisoner out of a force of over 100 men. USS Fox was sent to San Juan, Puerto Rico, in March 1823 to obtain a list of all legally commissioned privateers and a details of their instructions. When the American schooner entered San Juan Harbor on March 3, an artillery battery fired on the ship. A few shots hit the Fox which mortally wounded her commander, Lieutenant William H. Cocke. Commodore Porter later accepted an apology for the incident from Puerto Rico's governor. The British warships Tyne and HMS Thracian of eighteen guns defeated the pirate Cayatano Aragonez's thirteen-gun ship Zaragozana on March 31, in a running battle, the two British ships chased Captain Aragonez into Mata Harbor where boats were lowered and captured the vessel. Ten pirates were killed and twenty eight were captured while the Royal Navy sustained only slight casualties. Two barges, USS Gallinipper and USS Mosquito, liberated an American merchant vessel on April 8. The navy sailors killed two of the pirates and arrested one other though most got away.

On April 16, Mosquito, Gallinipper and USS Peacock, spotted a felucca off Colorados, Cuba. Peacock managed to capture the felucca though its crew fled to shore before scuttling three of their schooners.

Grampus rescued the crew of the American schooner Shiboleth after it was taken by pirates in June 1823. The brigands had boarded the merchantman silently, killed the guards, and then cornered the remainder of the crew within the ship. The pirates robbed the ship and set her on fire, Grampus arrived when Shiboleth was still burning and took off her surviving crew. A few days later, pirates attacked another merchant before being detected by the Spanish Army and captured. USS Ferret's crew skirmished with the brigands in June. During one incident, Ferret found a few pirate craft in shallow water off Matanzas. First Ferret attacked using her broadside guns and sank two of the boats which were fleeing along the coast. Due to the low depth, a boat was used to attack the remaining craft but when the Americans came within range, the pirates opened fire and shot a hole through their boat which returned to Ferret and sank. With their only boat destroyed, the Americans were forced to continue their patrol and the brigands got to shore. Later that day, Ferret commandeered a small vessel with a shallow draft and returned to where their boat was sunk, hoping to engage the pirates again but bad weather stopped the operation. The following morning the Americans encountered a British merchantman which gave them a boat. Again Ferret returned to Matanzas Bay but all that was there was the two sunken boats that she destroyed earlier.

On July 5, 1823, USS Sea Gull, under the command of Lieutenant William H. Watson, with the barges Gallinipper and Mosquito, fought pirates off Matanzas, near where Lieutenant Allen was killed a year earlier. The three American vessels encountered a heavily armed schooner, with a crew of about seventy-five, near a Cuban village. The United States Navy attacked with their cannon and the schooner was hit so her captain began a retreat. When further hits struck the schooner, the pirates panicked and began to abandon ship by jumping into the water. The barges maneuvered in close to the schooner and the sailors and marines on board fired volleys into their fleeing enemy, shouting "Allen, Allen" in the process. Fifteen pirates made it ashore but were attacked by an American landing party. Eleven more were killed and the last four were captured by the Cuban villagers. In total about seventy pirates were killed while only five survived. On July 21, the commanders of Beagle and Greyhound were investigating Cape Cruz, Cuba in a boat when it was fired upon from the shore. The Americans withdrew to their ship and on the next morning they landed sailors and marines who attacked and destroyed a makeshift fort. The pirates evaded the American shore party but their base was dismantled and a few heavy artillery pieces were removed. USS Sea Gull, with Ralph Voorhees in command, recaptured the merchant schooner Pacification from pirates on March 30.

=== 1824–1825 ===
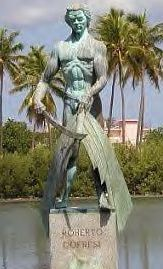
A monument of Roberto Cofresi in Cabo Rojo, Puerto Rico.

Throughout the history of the West Indies Squadron, tropical disease was common among the American warships which had to sail back to the United States when outbreaks occurred. By January 1824, most of the West Indies Squadron ships had been recalled, mainly because of illness though in February, the squadron under Commodore Porter, sailing in flagship USS Firefly, returned to operate for a few months before sailing north again in July. During this time, piracy in Puerto Rican waters began to briefly rise until mid-1825: between July and August, ten attacks on American merchant vessels were reported and only a few warships remained on station. By October the majority were back in home waters. Commodore Porter was relieved of duty in February 1825 and joined the Mexican Navy; this was after the Spanish authorities in Puerto Rico detained USS Peacock's commander Lieutenant Platt in October 1824. That month pirates raided Saint Thomas in the Danish Virgin Islands and returned to Fajardo with $5,000 worth of stolen merchandise from an American owned business. The stores owner requested that Lieutenant Platt help him recover his goods. Platt landed men in Fajardo on October 27. In order to not alert the pirates, the shore party wore civilian clothes and as a result, they were arrested by the Spanish Army and charged with piracy. Platt explained why he was out of uniform and later the Spanish allowed for one of his men to retrieve the lieutenant's uniform and commission. Upon seeing this, the Americans were released. When Commodore Porter heard of this he sailed to Fajardo with USS John Adams, Beagle and Grampus. There he landed a shore party on November 14 and demanded an apology from the Spanish. Eventually the Spaniards agreed to make a public apology so the expedition boarded their ships and sailed away. The United States government was not happy with Commodore Porter's actions and he was court martialed before resigning his commission. The American operation against West Indies pirates was declared a victory in 1825 though occasional outbreaks of piracy continued.

In March 1825, Gallinipper was accompanied by the frigate HMS Dartmouth and the schooners HMS Lion and HMS Union in an operation against Cuban pirates. United States Navy Lieutenant Isaac McKeever commanded and led an attack against a hostile schooner at the mouth of the Sagua la Grande. American and British forces took the ship, killed eight enemies and captured nineteen others, incurring only one man wounded. On the following day, another schooner was captured but the pirates escaped and the vessel was taken without bloodshed. El Mosquito, the ship of famed pirate Roberto Cofresí was disabled on March 5, by USS Grampus and two Spanish sloops off Boca del Infierno. With his crew scattered, the pirate captain fled inland, where a local by the name of Juan Garay recognized and ambushed him allowing the authorities to capture him. Cofresí was considered the last Caribbean pirate to be successful. After he was executed on March 29, 1825, piracy declined in the region for good. United States naval operations in the West Indies were eventually turned over to the Home Squadron and the Brazil Squadron by 1842.

== See also ==
- Africa Squadron
- Barbary Pirates
- Blockade of Africa
- Golden Age of Piracy
- Jean Lafitte
- North America and West Indies Station
- Piracy in the Caribbean

== Bibliography ==
- Farragut, Loyall (1879). The Life of David Glasgow Farragut, First Admiral of the United States Navy: Embodying His Journal and Letters. New York: D. Appleton and Company. p. 586. Another copy. ISBN 9781376944440 (reprint).
- Konstam, Angus (2007). Predators of the Seas. Skyhorse Publishing. p. 240. ISBN 9781602390355. Another copy.
- Wombwell, A. James (2010). The Long War Against Piracy: Historical Trends. Fort Leavenworth, Kansas: Combat Studies Institute Press. p. 204. ISBN 978-0-9823283-6-1.
