= West Indies Squadron (United States) =

Military unit of the United States Navy

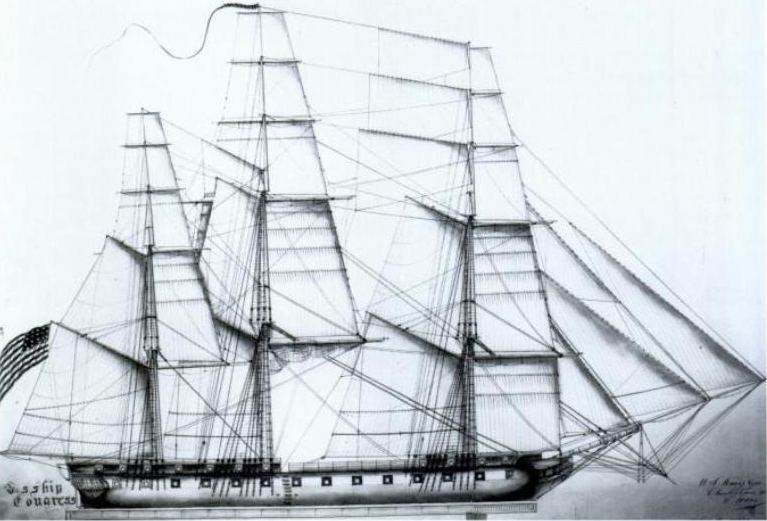
- The frigate USS Congress was a flagship of the squadron.
- Active: 1822–1842
- Country: United States of America
- Branch: United States Navy; United States Revenue-Marine
- Type: Naval squadron
- Garrison/HQ: Saint Thomas Island; Pensacola Naval Yard, Florida

The West Indies Squadron, or the West Indies Station, was a United States Navy squadron that operated in the West Indies in the early nineteenth century. It was formed due to the need to suppress piracy in the Caribbean Sea, the Antilles and the Gulf of Mexico region of the Atlantic Ocean. This unit later engaged in the Second Seminole War until being combined with the Home Squadron in 1842. From 1822 to 1826 the squadron was based out of Saint Thomas Island until the Pensacola Naval Yard was constructed.

== Formation ==
United States Navy ships had for years operated against piracy and the slave trade in the Caribbean and Gulf of Mexico but it was not until 1822 that a permanent squadron was formed. American warships were assigned to anti-piracy operations in the West Indies as early as 1817 but after a September 1821 attack by pirates, in which three American merchant ships were captured, the United States Congress authorized Commodore James Biddle to dispatch a fleet to the Caribbean. This force consisted of two frigates, USS Macedonian, and USS Congress, two corvettes, USS Cyane and USS John Adams, two sloops-of-war, USS Hornet and USS Peacock, two brigs, USS Spark and USS Enterprise, and the schooners USS Grampus, USS Alligator, USS Shark and USS Porpoise. The Revenue-Marine operated two cutters, USRC Alabama and USRC Louisiana, along with two gunboats, No. 158 and No. 168. A total of over 1,500 sailors and marine personnel served in the squadron. Before only single-ship operations had been undertaken. Over the course of a few decades these vessels continually engaged Spanish, Venezuelan, Cuban and Puerto Rican pirates. Many of the actions ended with the sinking or capturing of pirate vessels though often the outlaws escaped to shore.

== Anti-piracy operations ==
=== Legal and political background ===
Caribbean pirates of the era were Latin Americans who (usually) doubled as privateers. Revolution against Spain was widespread and both the Spanish and the rebel governments issued letters of marque. The privateers often captured American merchantmen and attacked their crews. Since the United States was not at war with Spain or any of the rebel Latin American governments, the letters of marque did not apply to U.S. vessels and the Americans branded all persons attacking U.S. flagged vessels as pirates.

In 1819 President James Monroe sent Commodore Perry to Venezuela with the frigate USS Constellation, the corvette USS John Adams, and USS Nonsuch. The commodore's orders were to demand restitution for attacks on United States' merchant ships by Venezuelan privateers, and to receive an assurance that the privateers would be restrained from capturing American vessels. Perry was initially successful in completing his mission, and a treaty was signed on 11 August 1819. However, on his cruise back to the United States he died of yellow fever at Trinidad, which led to failure of the agreement.

=== The informal squadron 1817–1822 ===
The first American vessels to serve against West Indies piracy were part of an unofficial squadron which became the founding warships of the prolonged operation. The schooners USS Enterprise, USS Nonsuch, and USS Lynx with the gunboats No. 158 and No. 168 were among the vessels deployed between 1817 and 1822. All of these ships operated independently and there was no one commander of the squadron until its official establishment.

On 22 December 1817, USS John Adams forced the pirate Luis Aury to evacuate his base at Amelia Island, Florida. Later, John Adams was flagship of Commodore Biddle's squadron. By 1820, conflict with the pirates and privateers started to increase: United States warships engaged in several naval actions that year, and a total of 27 American merchant ships were captured. Between 1818 and 1821 the USS Enterprise captured 13 pirate and slave ships while serving with the New Orleans Squadron – later in the West Indies. On 24 October 1819, while under command of Lieutenant J.R. Madison, USS Lynx captured two pirate schooners and two boats in the Gulf of Mexico, and on 9 November she captured another pirate boat in Galveston Bay. Lynx disappeared in January 1820 while sailing to Jamaica, she likely sank due to a storm; none of her crew were ever seen or heard from again.

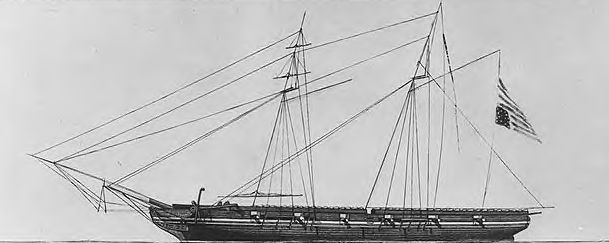
The schooner USS Grampus defeated 2 pirate ships during her service with the West Indies Squadron

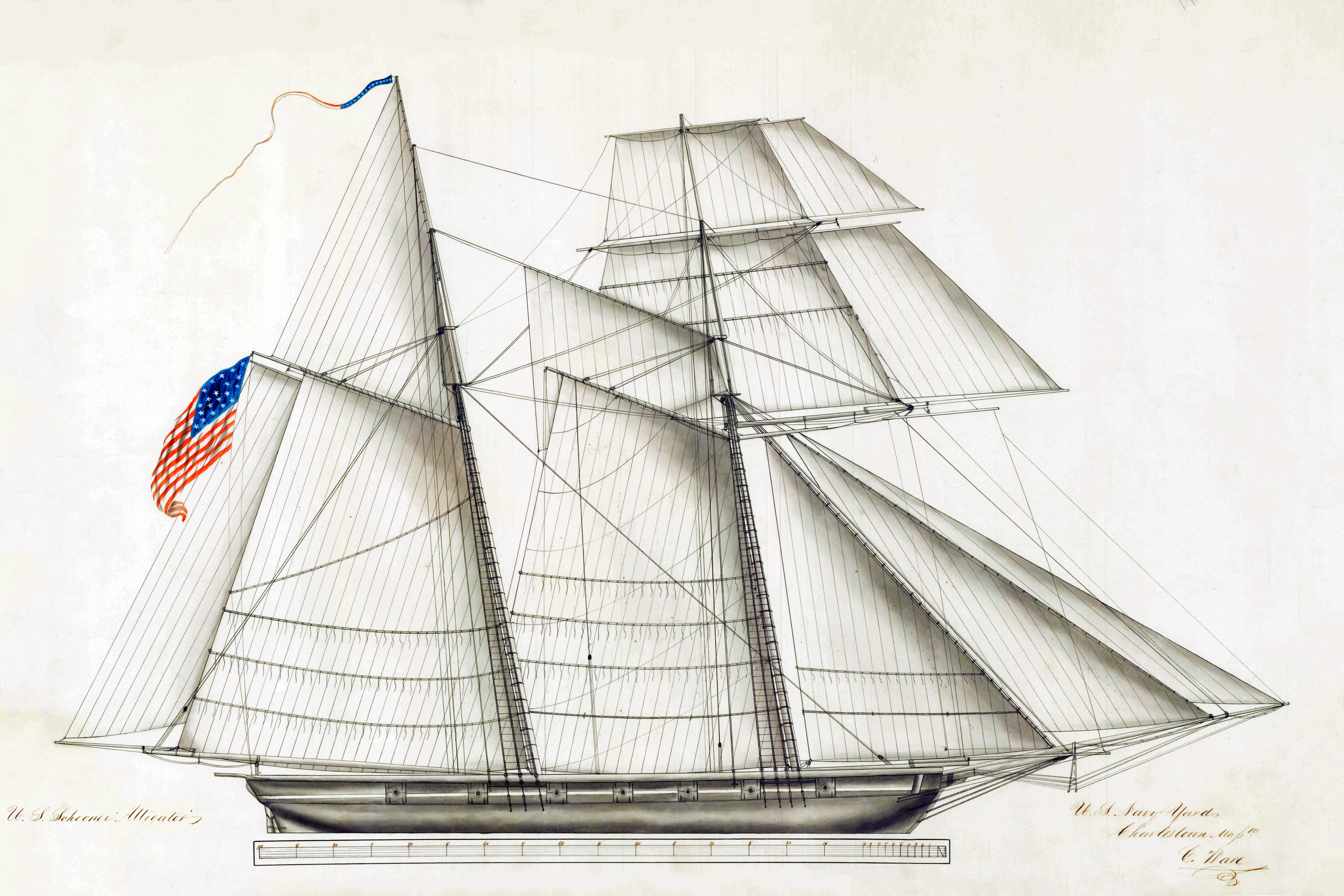
USS Alligator, a schooner and veteran pirate fighter

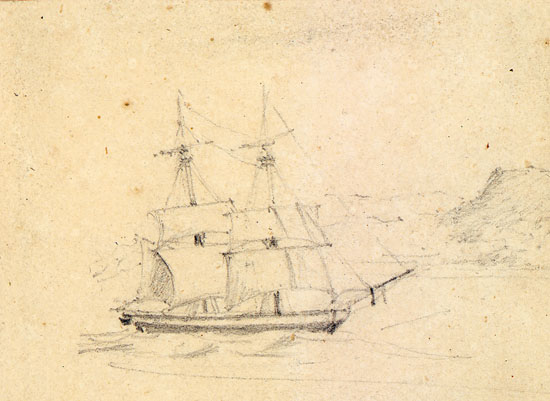
USS Peacock 1813

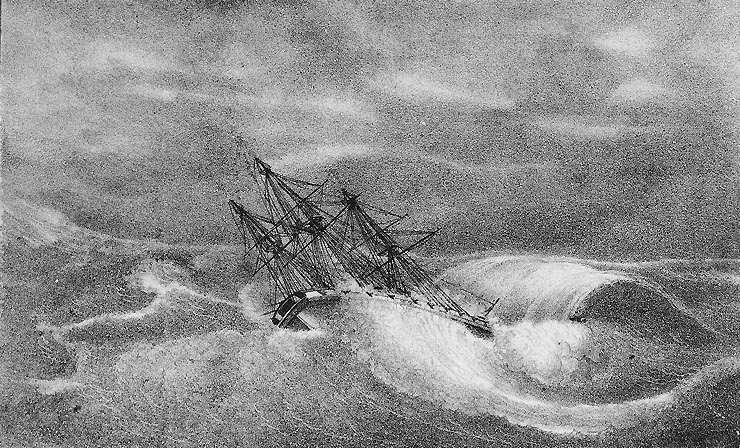
USS Hornet foundering off Tampico, Mexico, 29 September 1829

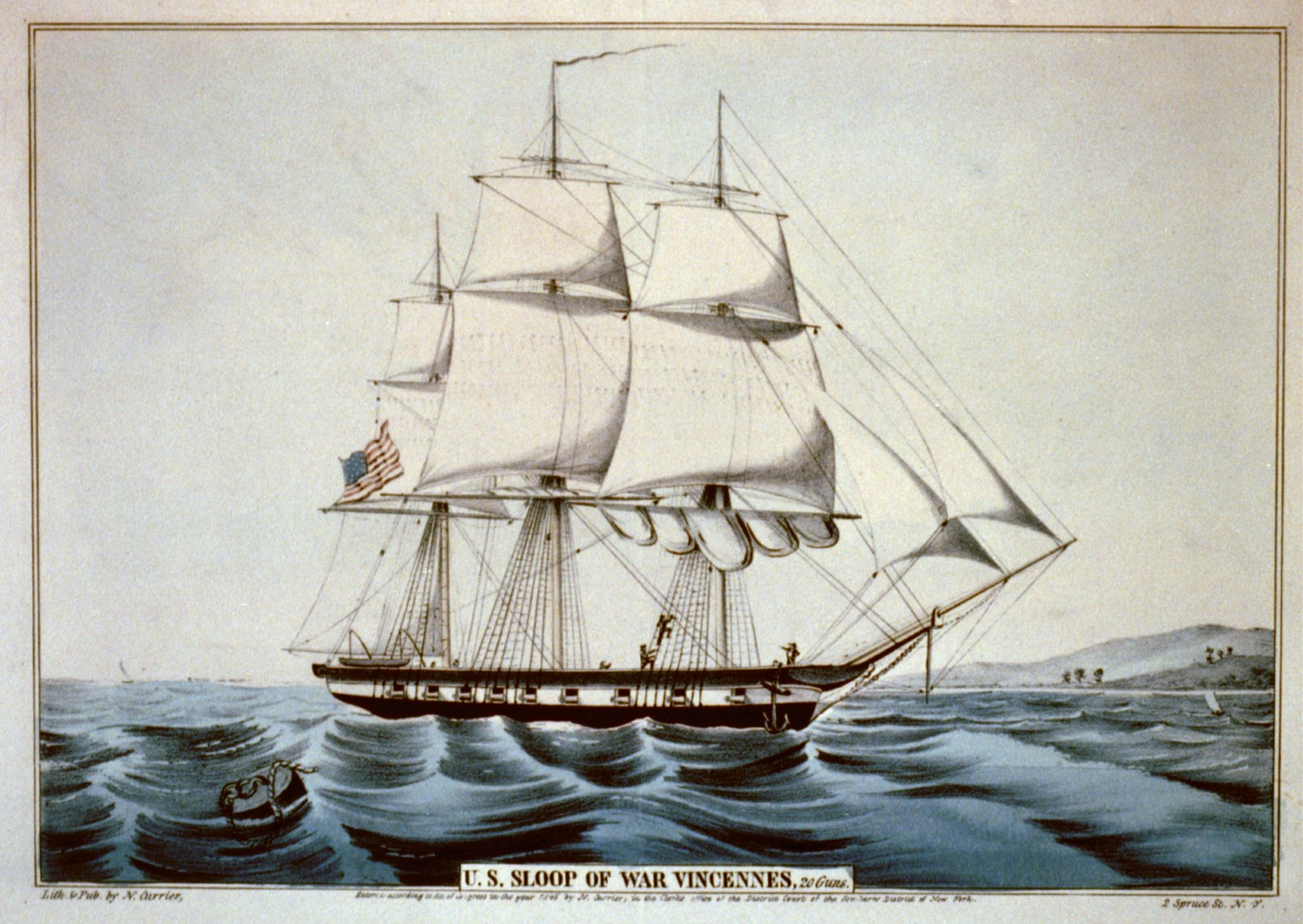
USS Vincennes

In October 1821, while sailing off Cape San Antonio, Cuba, USS Enterprise came to the assistance of three merchant vessels that had been seized by four pirate vessels. Boats were launched and attacked the brigands; in the end, over 40 pirates were killed or captured and two of their vessels taken. A month later, the Enterprise attacked a pirate base near Cape San Antonio and cleared the area of criminals. In September 1821, brigands captured three American merchant vessels off Matanzas, Cuba. The pirates tortured the crew of one vessel and set her on fire; survivors were able to escape to shore in a boat. The pirates killed three men on the second American vessel and everyone on the third vessel; the pirates also burned both vessels. This incident was one of the main reasons why an anti-piracy operation was launched.

USS Hornet captured a privateer schooner named Moscow on 29 October 1821 and on 21 December she captured a pirate ship apparently without a fight; the pirates escaped to shore. On 16 December 1821, the USS Porpoise, Lieutenant James Ramage commanding, was sailing off Cape San Antonio and found five enemy vessels, including the merchant brig Bolina. Forty sailors were lowered into five boats and Ramage's command.

Though some of the pirates fled to shore, many resisted, and the five American boats destroyed the five pirate ships by burning them, and freed Bolina. Three pirates were captured and several killed according to reports.

=== Early West Indies Squadron 1821–1822 ===
In autumn of 1821, USS Spark, under Lieutenant John Elton, departed Boston and joined the list of vessels assigned to counter piracy. In January 1822, Elton captured a Dutch-flagged pirate sloop. Seven prisoners were taken to Charleston for trial. Spark then returned to the Caribbean and remained on station for the next three years, by which time the official West Indies Squadron was formed. When the United States Navy began campaigning against the pirates, the Royal Navy was quick to follow suit and created their own West Indies Squadron.

In March 1822, boat crews from the USS Enterprise captured two launches and four boats in a creek near Cape San Antonio, and on 6 March she seized eight more craft and over 150 pirates.

USS Grampus encountered the brig Palyrma [sic?] flying Spanish colors on 15 August 1822. Commanding Lieutenant Gregory suspected the ship to be a pirate so he approached to board but as the Grampus drew near, Palyrma opened fire and fought a brief 3½ minute battle. After the Americans boarded Palmyra, they found that pirates were from Puerto Rico and had a letter of marque. However, the letter was found to be fake, so the Americans detained the pirates and handed them over to the Spanish in Cuba. At this time the usual procedure for dealing with captured pirates was turning them over to Spain because the United States didn't have the authority to imprison them. Neither could the United States Navy pursue the pirates on Spanish soil. When, in April 1822, Commodore David Porter, in USS Macedonian, assumed command of the station, one of his first missions was to consult with Cuban Governor Captain General Don Nicholas Mahy of Cuba, and the governor of Puerto Rico. Both governors denied Porter's request to allow American shore parties to land; at the time the United States government did permit the West Indies Squadron to do so, but only in remote areas.

Commodore Porter then attacked and destroyed a pirate force at Funda Bay, Cuba, between 28 and 30 September 1822. Also on 28 September Peacock captured a boat filled with pirates about 60 miles from Havana. Later that afternoon Peacock met the merchant vessel Speedwell which was attacked by pirates two hours before. In response, Captain Stephen Cassin launched a boat expedition that captured four schooners, though again most of the pirates escaped.

On 2 November 1822, USRC Louisiana, along with USS Peacock and the Royal Navy schooner HMS Speedwell, captured five pirate vessels off Havana. On 8 November 1822, Lieutenant Allen of USS Alligator was killed in battle, while leading an attack against three enemy schooners that were holding five merchantmen hostage. In the action, two of the schooners were captured and at least 14 pirates were killed.

=== Newly re-enforced squadron 1822–1825 ===
Due to fall-out over Lieutenant Allen's death, Secretary of the Navy Thompson authorized Commodore Porter to procure new vessels for the squadron. Porter acquired eight shallow-draft schooners, five large barges, a steam powered riverboat, and a storeship schooner. All commissioned in 1822, the schooners were each armed with three guns and became the USS Beagle, USS Ferret, USS Fox, USS Greyhound, USS Weasel, and the USS Wild Cat. The storeship was USS Decoy, and the steamer became USS Sea Gull.

The new squadron left the United States for Cuba on 15 February 1823. Commodore Biddle also received new orders of conduct: he was now permitted to land shore parties in populated areas, as long as he informed the locals first. Biddle was also ordered to cooperate with any other sovereign naval forces operating against pirates.

USS Fox was sent to San Juan, Puerto Rico, in March 1823 to obtain a list of all legally commissioned privateers and a details of their instructions. When the American schooner entered San Juan Harbor on 3 March an artillery battery fired on the ship. A few shots hit the Fox which mortally wounded Lieutenant W.H. Cocke, her commander. Commodore Porter later accepted an apology for the incident from Puerto Rico's governor.

Two barges, USS Gallinipper and USS Mosquito, liberated an American merchant vessel on 8 April. The navy sailors killed two pirates and arrested another, though most got away. On 16 April Mosquito, Gallinipper, and USS Peacock, spotted a felucca off Cuba's Colorados islands. Peacock managed to capture the felucca; the pirate crew scuttled their three schooners and fled to shore.

Grampus rescued the crew of the American schooner Shiboleth after it had been taken by pirates in June 1823. The brigands boarded the merchantman silently, killed the guards, and then cornered the remainder of the crew within the ship. The pirates robbed the ship and set her on fire. Grampus arrived when the Shiboleth was still burning and took off her surviving crew. The same pirates attacked another merchant ship a few days later before being detected by the Spanish Army and jailed.

In June 1823, the USS Ferret's crew skirmished with the brigands. During one incident, Ferret found a few pirate craft in shallow water off Matanzas. First Ferret attacked using her broadside guns and sank two boats among those fleeing along the coast. Due to the low depth, a boat was used to attack the remaining craft but when the Americans came within range, the pirates opened fire and shot a hole through the boat, which returned to Ferret and sank. With their only boat sunk, the Americans were forced to continue their patrol and the brigands got to shore. Later that day, Ferret commandeered a small vessel with a shallow draft and returned to where their boat was sunk, hoping to engage the pirates again, but bad weather stopped the operation. The following morning the Americans encountered a British merchantman that gave them a boat. Ferret returned to the waters off Matanzas, but only found the two sunken boats that she had destroyed earlier.

On 5 July 1823, USS Sea Gull, under the command of Lieutenant Watson, with the barges Gallinipper and Mosquito, fought pirates off Matanzas, near where Lieutenant Allen was killed in 1822. The three American vessels encountered a heavily armed schooner with a crew of about 75 near a Cuban village. The United States Navy attacked with their cannon and the schooner was hit, so her captain began a retreat. When further hits struck the schooner, the pirates panicked and began to abandon ship by jumping into the water. The barges maneuvered in close to the schooner and the sailors and marines on board fired volleys into their fleeing enemy, shouting "Allen, Allen" in the process. An American landing party attacked the 15 pirates who made it ashore; 11 more were killed and the last four were captured by the Cuban villagers. In total about 70 pirates were killed; only five survived.

On 21 July 1823, the commanders of Beagle and Greyhound were investigating Cape Cruz, Cuba, in a boat when it was fired upon from the shore. The Americans withdrew to their ship and on the next morning they landed sailors and marines, who attacked and destroyed a makeshift fort. The pirates evaded the American shore party, but the Americans dismantled the fort and removed its few heavy artillery pieces. USS Sea Gull, under the command of Ralph Voorhees, recaptured the merchant schooner Pacification from pirates on 30 March.

Throughout the history of the West Indies Squadron, tropical disease was common among the American warships which had to sail back to the United States when outbreaks occurred. By January 1824, most of the West Indies Squadron ships had been recalled, mainly because of illness, though in February the squadron under Commodore Porter returned to operate for a few months before sailing north again in July. During this time, piracy in Puerto Rican waters began to briefly rise until mid-1825, between July and August, ten attacks on American merchant vessels were reported and only a few warships remained on station, by October the majority were back in American ports.

In October 1824, pirates raided Saint Thomas in the Danish Virgin Islands and returned to Fajardo with $5,000 worth of merchandise stolen from an American-owned business. The store's owner requested that Lieutenant Platt help him recover his goods. Platt landed men in Fajardo on 27 October 1824; in order to not alert the pirates the shore party wore civilian clothes, and as result they were arrested by the Spanish Army and charged with piracy. Platt explained why he was out of uniform and later on the Spanish allowed one of his men to retrieve the lieutenant's uniform and commission. Upon seeing this, the Spaniards released the Americans. When Commodore Porter heard of this he sailed to Fajardo with USS John Adams, the Beagle, and Grampus. There he landed a shore party on 14 November and demanded an apology from the Spanish. Eventually the Spaniards agreed to make a public apology, so the expedition boarded their ships and sailed away.

The United States government was not pleased by Commodore Porter's actions; he was court martialed before resigning his commission. Commodore Porter was relieved of duty in February 1825, and joined and became head of the Mexican Navy from 1827 to 1829.

The American operation against pirates in the West Indies was declared a victory in 1825.

=== Joint British and U.S. operations 1825–1842 ===
In March 1825, the Gallinipper was accompanied by the frigate HMS Dartmouth and the schooners HMS Lion and HMS Union in an operation against Cuban pirates. U.S. Navy Lieutenant Isaac McKeever, in command, led an attack against a pirate schooner at the mouth of the Sagua la Grande River. American and British forces took the ship, killed eight outlaws and captured 19 others with only one man wounded. On the following day, another schooner was captured but the pirates escaped and the vessel was taken without bloodshed. This mission was one of the first joint operations conducted by British and American forces.

Famed pirate Roberto Cofresí was defeated on 5 March by the USS Grampus and two Spanish sloops off Boca del Infierno. Cofresi was considered the last successful Caribbean pirate and was executed on 29 March 1825. From 1827 to 1830, the West Indies Squadron was commanded by Charles G. Ridgely and engaged in anti-piracy activities. Piracy declined in the region, though isolated incidents involving the squadron and pirates continued into the 1830s.

Whenever the squadron was not searching for criminals on the sea, it operated by convoying merchant ships. United States naval operations in the West Indies were eventually turned over to the Home Squadron and the Brazil Squadron by 1842.

== Second Seminole War ==
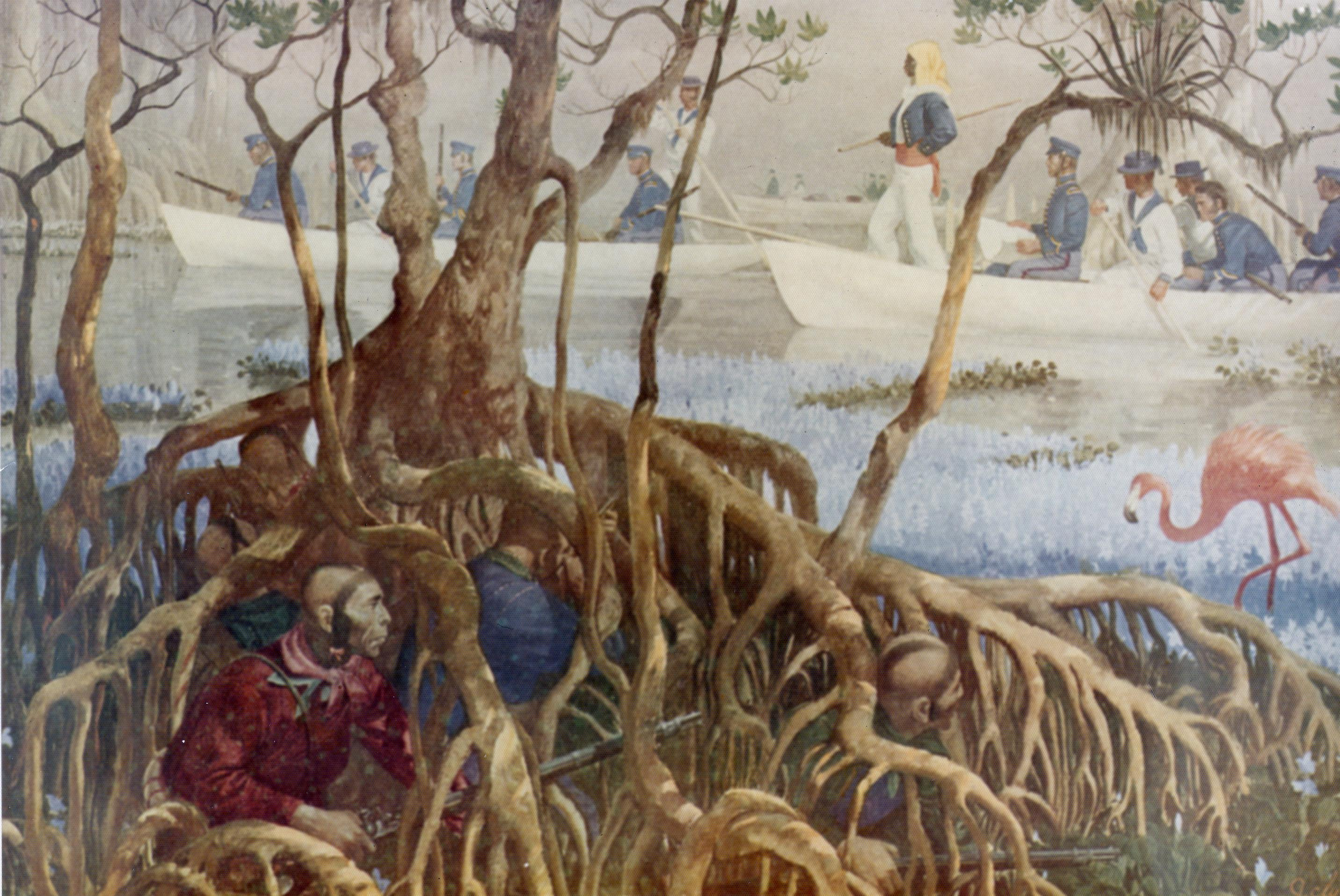
United States sailors and marines during a boat expition of the Second Seminole War

Before it disbanded, the West Indies Squadron engaged in one last Caribbean conflict with the native Americans of Florida. When the conflict with the Seminoles started in 1835, the United States Secretary of the Navy Mahlon Dickerson ordered the West Indies Squadron under Commodore A.J. Dallas to begin campaigning along the Florida coast and swamplands. USS Vandalia was one of the warships assigned to these operations.

In November 1836, marines and sailors in boats from the squadron engaged Seminole warriors in Wahoo Swamp. During the action, Army Major David Moniac was killed while the expedition attempted to cross a stream of unknown depth. Under heavy fire, the American marines and soldiers were forced to retreat.

Men of the West Indies Squadron engaged in another defeat at Jupiter Inlet in January 1838. At this battle, an expedition under Lieutenant Levin M. Powell landed 80 sailors and marines near a Seminole camp and in the ensuing action, the Seminoles ambushed the Navy expedition. Five men were killed and another 22 wounded. The sailors and marines then returned to their boats and paddled back to their ship.

Other operations were undertaken by the squadron until it was disbanded and its ships became part of the Home Squadron.

== Commanders ==
- Commodore James Biddle Oct 1821 - 3 Mar 1823
- Commodore David Porter 3 Mar 1823 – Feb 1825
- Commodore Lewis Warrington Feb 1825 - 1827
- Commodore Charles G. Ridgely 1827 – 1829
- Commodore Jesse D. Elliott 1829 – 1832
- Commodore John D. Henley 16 Aug 1832 – 23 May 1835
- Commodore Alexander J. Dallas 16 Jul 1835 – 1837
- Commodore Foxhall A. Parker 1837 - 1839
- Commodore William B. Shubrick 1838 – 1840
- Commodore Jesse Wilkinson 1840 - 1842
