= Capture of the schooner Bravo =

1819 naval battle off the coast of Florida

- Part of West Indies Anti-Piracy Operations, Piracy in the Caribbean
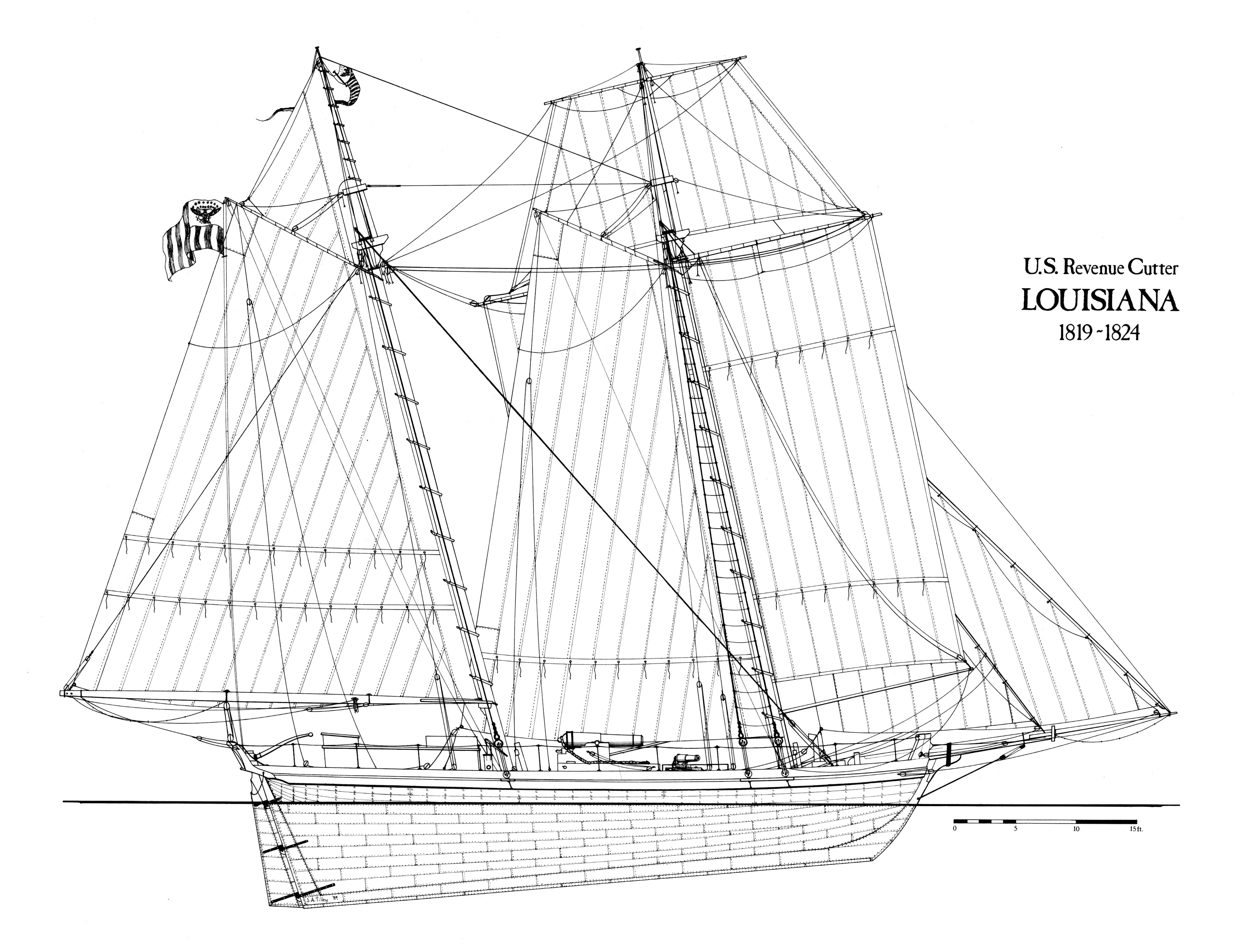
- A picture of USRC Louisiana
Date	August 31, 1819
Location	off Florida, United States, Gulf of Mexico
Result	American victory

Belligerents
United States	Caribbean pirates

Commanders and leaders
(United States) William H. Crawford (United States) Jairus Loomis	Jean La Farges (executed)

Strength
2 schooners	1 schooner

Casualties and losses
Unknown	1 schooner captured

The capture of the schooner Bravo was a naval battle fought in 1819 between United States Revenue Cutter Service cutters and one of Jean Lafitte's pirate ships.

In early 1819, the two U.S. Revenue Cutters USRC Alabama and USRC Louisiana had just been constructed in New York City at a cost of $4,500 each. The two sister ships, each equipped with a single pivot gun in the 9- to 18-pounder range, were dispatched to the Gulf of Mexico to conduct counter-piracy patrols.

In August 1819, Alabama was temporarily assigned to New Orleans to help thwart the pirate incidents in those waters with Louisiana. On 31 August, the two ships were sailing the Gulf off southern Florida when they sighted the schooner Bravo. U.S. Revenue-Marine Captain Jairus Loomis crew gave chase and eventually came within firing range. Bravo resisted and a brief gunnery duel occurred, in which the first officer and three crew members of Louisiana were wounded. Several pirates were killed in action. The Americans then boarded Bravo and the pirates were captured. Jean La Farges, who commanded the suspected privateer, was a lieutenant of French pirate Jean Lafitte. Apparently no letter of marque was presented to the Americans, which explained why the pirates fled at the sight of the Revenue Cutter schooners. Jean La Farges was subsequently hanged in Louisiana on May 25, 1820.

In the following years, more battles occurred between United States naval forces and pirates in the Gulf of Mexico and the Caribbean. On 19 April 1819, Alabama and Louisiana destroyed a pirate base at the Patterson's Town Raid on Breton Island, Louisiana. Another action was fought on 10 July 1820 when the Captain Louisiana Jairus Loomis captured four pirate ships off Belize. On 2 November 1822, Louisiana along with USS Peacock and the Royal Navy schooner HMS Speedwell captured five pirate vessels off Havana, Cuba.

== Fate ==
Louisiana's career was soon over. In March 1824 she was put up for public auction. Alabama eventually went on to fight the slave trade in the Atlantic until she was sold in Florida on 6 August 1833.

== See also ==
- Barbary Wars
- Operation Enduring Freedom – Horn of Africa
