= Action of 9 November 1822 =

US Navy battle against pirates off Cuba

- Part of West Indies Anti-Piracy Operations, Piracy in the Caribbean
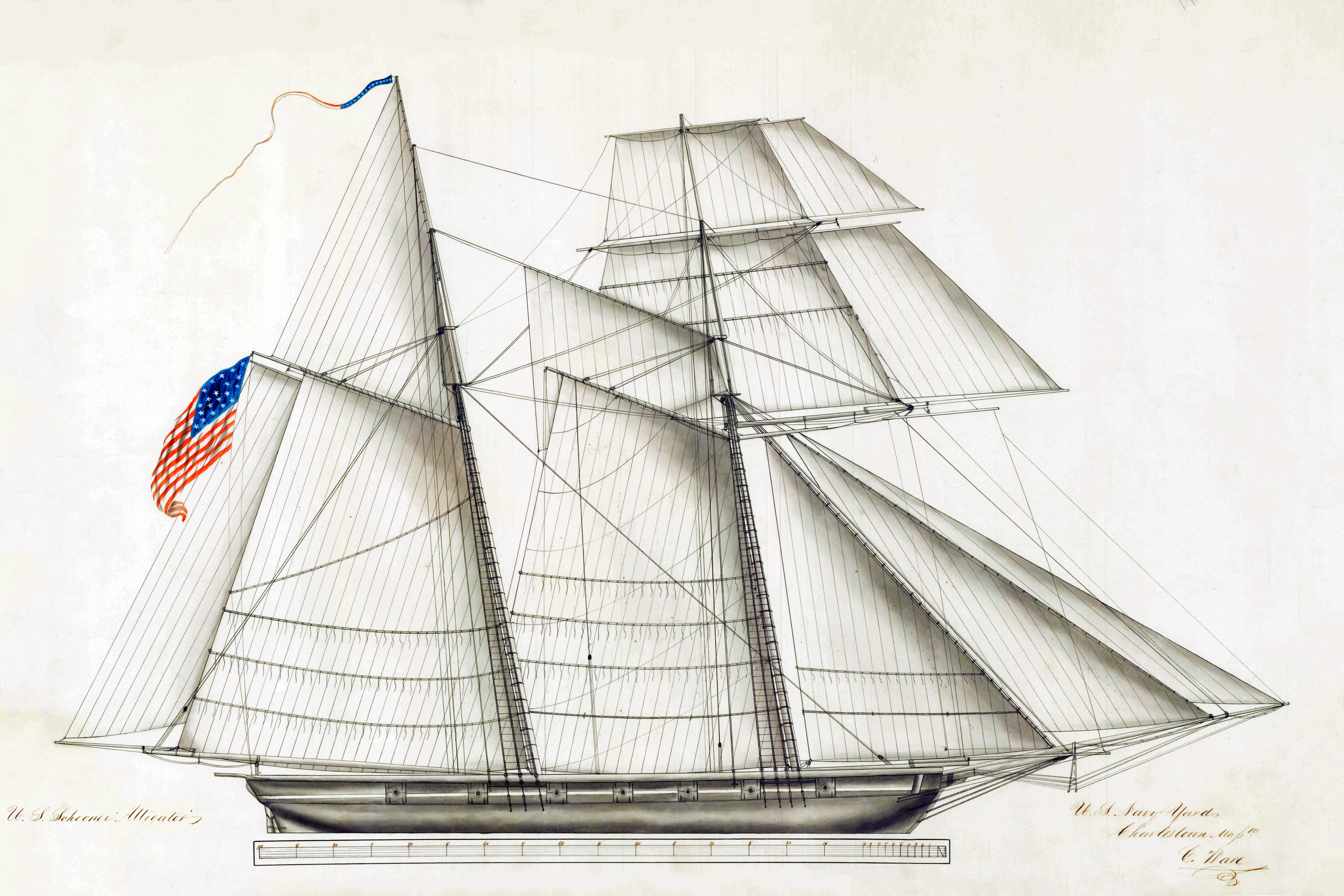
- USS Alligator
| Date | 9 November 1822 |
| Location | Approximately 45 mi (72 km) east of Matanzas, Cuba |
| Result | Indecisive: Prizes recaptured; Pirates escape |

Belligerents
| United States | Pirates |

Commanders and leaders
| William Howard Allen † | unknown |

Strength
| 1 schooner 3 boats | 3 schooners |

Casualties and losses
| 4 killed 3 wounded | 1 schooner captured ~14 killed |
- Five captured merchant ships were liberated by American forces after the action.

The action of 9 November 1822 was a naval battle fought between the United States Navy schooner USS Alligator and a squadron of three pirate schooners off the coast of Cuba during the Navy's West Indies anti-piracy operation. Fifteen leagues from Matanzas, Cuba, a large band of pirates captured several vessels and held them for ransom. Upon hearing of the pirate attacks, Alligator under Lieutenant William Howard Allen rushed to the scene to rescue the vessels and seize the pirates.

Upon arriving at the bay where the pirates were said to be, Alligator dispatched boats to engage the enemy vessels, as the water was too shallow for the warship to engage them directly. With Allen personally commanding one of the boats, the Americans assaulted the schooner Revenge. Although the Navy was able to force the pirates into abandoning Revenge, the buccaneers managed to fight their way out of the bay and inflict seven casualties. With their commander mortally wounded, the boats ceased pursuit of the pirates, but were able to recover the vessels that had been held in the bay.

== Background ==
In early November 1822, the schooner USS Alligator, under the command of Lieutenant Allen, was put into Matanzas, Cuba, intending to patrol the area as part of the United States Navy's West Indian Anti-Piracy Campaign. Upon arriving at the port, Allen discovered two Americans attempting to raise $7,000 in order to pay a ransom to pirates that had captured their vessels. If the ransom was not delivered, the pirates threatened to destroy the ships and assault their crews. Learning from these men that the pirates were located some 15 leagues away, Allen took the civilians aboard, deciding to attempt to recover their ship.

The band of pirates was relatively large, consisting of around 125 men and three armed schooners. One schooner, Revenge, was an 80-ton vessel armed with five cannon and 35 men; a second, 90-ton schooner had six guns and 30 men; a third vessel measured 60 tons, was armed with three cannon and manned by 60 men. The pirates also manned five American prizes. These were the ship rigged vessel William Henry from New York, the brigs Iris and Sarah Morril from Boston, and a pair of merchant schooners, one hailing from Rochester, Massachusetts, and the other from Salem.

Allen's force of 100 was outnumbered and also outgunned, with Alligator mounting only 12 six-pounders, compared to the pirates' 14 cannon. However, Alligator and her crew were experienced, having taken forcibly the Portuguese brig Marianna Flora the year before. Allen was an experienced commander who had taken command of USS Argus during her engagement with HMS Pelican in the War of 1812. Though Alligator's draft was too deep to chase pirate craft inshore, she could send her cutter, gig, and launch out with boarding parties.

== Action ==
As Revenge was the nearest of the three pirate vessels, Allen ordered Alligator's boats lowered to run inshore and attack her. Some 40 men armed with small arms were put into the boats, with Allen personally taking command of the launch, Lieutenant Dale the cutter, and midshipman Henley the gig. Revenge was already underway by the time it was sighted and attempted to escape despite the lack of wind, using its sweeps. After the American boats had rowed about 10 miles (16 km), the pirate schooner made an about-face and raised a red flag. Upon approaching the pirates, the American craft were fired on with both grape and round shot. The American boats returned fire with small arms and moved in to board the vessel. Rather than try to fight off the boarding attempt, the pirates abandoned Revenge while another schooner covered their escape. Alligator's gig, manned by Henley and four men, was sent off to take Revenge as a prize.

Allen then set off with the other two boats in an attempt to seize the schooner which had helped Revenge's crew escape. This second schooner maintained a heavy fire upon the advancing American boats, and Alligator's cutter soon lagged behind as it had taken heavy casualties and had trouble manning its oars. Allen attempted to rally his men by standing up and waving them forward. In so doing, Allen exposed himself and was struck by musket fire, taking a round first in the head and then in the chest. With their commander mortally wounded and their crew taking heavy casualties, the American boats withdrew, thus allowing the second pirate schooner, as well as a third that had not been engaged, to escape. The vessels the pirates had seized were abandoned and recovered after the action had ended.

== Aftermath ==
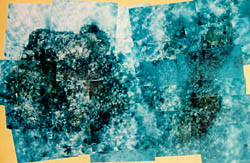
An aerial view of a possible wreck site of Alligator near Islamorada, Florida

By the end of the action, the American boats were all damaged and their crews suffered four killed, including Allen who died some four hours after the battle ended, and three wounded. The pirates suffered heavier casualties, with 14 bodies being counted by the Americans and several further buccaneers presumed drowned. Alligator returned to Matanzas with the recovered prizes; there Allen was buried with an escort provided by the local governor.

Alligator left Matanzas on 18 November, escorting her prizes back to the United States. The following day, she ran hard aground on a coral reef in the Florida Keys, since named Alligator Reef. Her crew failed to refloat the vessel, but managed to salvage her guns, papers, and other valuables. Fearing that she would be salvaged by pirates, they set fire to her and she sank. Though it was previously thought that the location of the wreck was known, a 1996 expedition proved this false, and the location of the Alligator remains unknown. Allen was regarded by the Navy as a hero, and his name was used as a rallying cry the following year when USS Galliniper and USS Mosquito engaged and defeated pirates led by Diabolito near the same area.
