= Diabolito =

Spanish pirate

- Born: Cuba
- Died: 1823 near Matanzas, Cuba
- Piratical career
- Nickname: Little Devil
- Type: Pirate
- Years active: 1810s-1820s
- Rank: Captain
- Base of operations: Cuba

Diabolito or Little Devil (died July 1823) was a 19th-century Cuban pirate. One of the more violent of the era, he engaged the United States Navy and Revenue Marine Service several times, being one of the main fugitives hunted and pursued later by American Naval forces during the West Indies anti-piracy operations of the United States in the Caribbean during the 1820s. He was also known for having a mixed-race crew, which included “English, Frenchmen, Spaniards, Mulattoes, and Negroes.”

== Biography ==
The Cuban-born Diabolito became known as a particularly dangerous pirate operating from his home island during the early 19th century. He among others including Charles Gibbs, and Roberto Cofresí were identified as key figures in piracy when President James Monroe authorized the formation of an anti-piracy squadron to combat attacks on American shipping and naval forces occurring off the Florida coast. Based in Key West under Commodore David Porter, a veteran of the First Barbary War, the Second Barbary War, and the War of 1812, the "Mosquito Fleet" soon began patrolling the Gulf of Mexico and the Caribbean. Diabolito and other Cuban-based pirates were easily able to escape from American vessels, either escaping into the back country of the Florida Keys or retreating to Cuba where Porter's forces were unable to pursue. As the years passed, however, Cuban ship owners and other businessmen petitioned for authorities to cooperate with the United States. Spanish officials were unable to continue turning a blind eye to piracy, which often amounted to attacks on lone merchant vessels and fishing boats, and agreed to assist in hunting down Diabolito and others.

In April 1823, Diabolito encountered Porter and was cornered off the northern coast of Cuba. After a brief fight, he and his crew abandoned their ships and fled inland. Out of his 70-man crew, 30 were either killed during the fighting or drowned while trying to swim to land. He managed to elude authorities and, acquiring another ship, he set sail for the Yucatan. He again encountered the Mosquito Fleet when USS Gallinipper and USS Mosquito, commanded by Lieutenant William H. Watson and Lieutenant William Inman respectively, pursued him upon finding him in Cuba once again. Although the pirates outnumbered the Americans, whose total force numbered 31 men compared to the 70 or 80 pirates, Watson gave the order to attack and sailed towards the pirates, driving them into the sea. The men began abandoning their ship, the 4-gun schooner Catalina, and the American vessels were "soon in the midst of the swimmers, and, laying about right and left, exterminated dozens of them". All of his men were either killed or were captured by local authorities, Diabolito himself being killed in the water when he refused to surrender.
