= Charles Gibbs =

American pirate (1798–1831)

- Born: James D. Jeffers; November 5, 1798; Newport, Rhode Island, U.S.
- Died: April 25, 1831 (aged 32); Ellis Island, U.S.
- Cause of death: Execution by hanging
- Occupation: Pirate

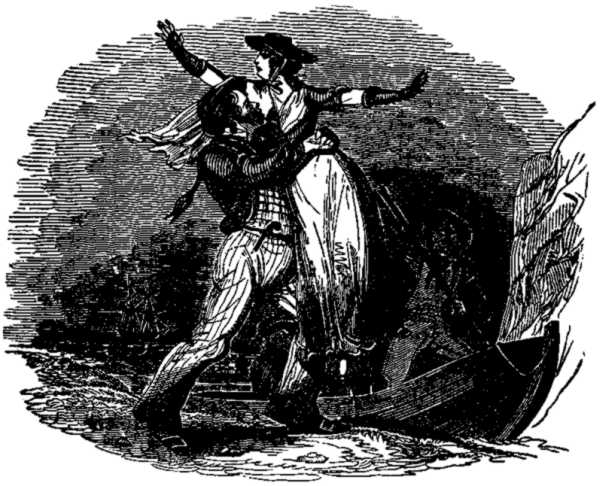
1837 illustration of Gibbs carrying off a Dutch girl

Charles Gibbs (November 5, 1798 – April 25, 1831) was the pseudonym of an American pirate, born James D. Jeffers. Jeffers was one of the last active pirates in the Caribbean during the early 19th century of the West Indies piracy conflict, and was among the last persons to be executed for piracy by the United States.

His career, like many others during this time, was marked by violence and brutality. Shortly before his execution, Jeffers admitted to have been involved in the killing of as many as 400 victims. His confessions during his imprisonment and trial, detailing his career, were recorded and published following his death and remained popular reading throughout the mid-19th century. However, given the sensationalistic nature of these accounts, historians have questioned the veracity of Jeffers's confessions.

== Career ==
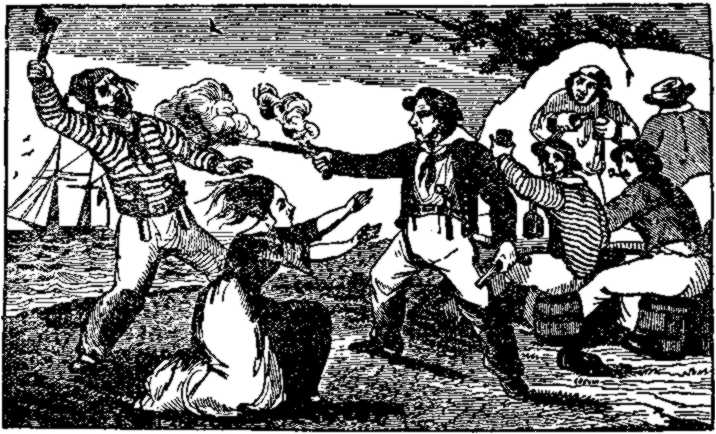
1837 illustration of Gibbs killing one of his own crew

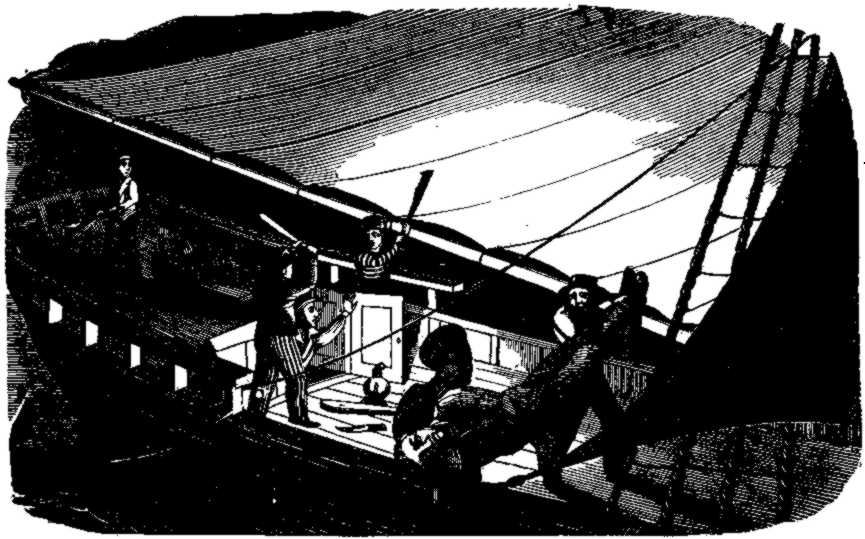
1837 illustration of Gibbs murdering Captain Thornby

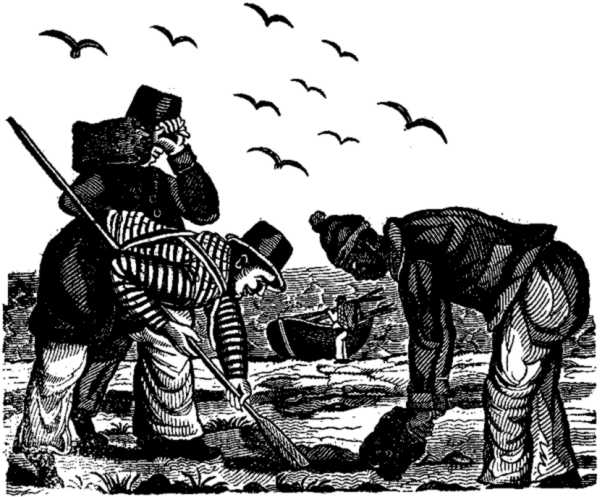
1837 illustration of Gibbs and Wansley burying treasure

Born in Newport, Rhode Island, on November 5, 1798, he was the son of a Newport sea captain who had served as an American privateer during the American Revolutionary War. Jeffers would later claim to have enlisted in the United States Navy during the War of 1812 and to have served under James Lawrence on USS Hornet and Chesapeake before being captured following a battle with HMS Shannon in Boston Harbor in 1813. Later investigations into these claims proved this to be untrue. (Before his hanging, he admitted to having first gone to sea aboard a Newport-based brig called Brutus in 1816, aged 17). By his own account, he was involved in privateering starting in 1816 aboard a Margarita Island-based schooner called Maria. During a cruise Jeffers took part in a mutiny after which the crew abandoned their letter of marque from Cartagena, Colombia, and began engaging in piracy. Jeffers told his biographers that he was named navigator of Maria, and claimed to have eventually assumed the captain's role. Stories later circulated as to how, during his time in the Caribbean Sea and the Gulf of Mexico, he became known for his cruel treatment of prisoners. He was said to have once had the arms and legs chopped off of a captured captain and, in another incident, ordered an entire merchantman's crew to be burned alive after setting fire to the ship. (No contemporary accounts mention these episodes, which appear to have been invented by later writers.)

On October 21, 1821, Jeffers encountered the brig USS Enterprise under Lieutenant Commander Lawrence Kearny while his fleet of four ships were attacking three merchantmen off Cape San Antonio, Cuba. Despite outnumbering USS Enterprise, Jeffers's fleet was destroyed after a short battle and he was forced to flee into the jungle with his men.

Little is known about his life immediately following his escape. He claimed to have resided in the United States by 1825, and to have served Argentina in the Cisplatine War as both a regular naval officer and as commander of a privateer. Following a reputed voyage to North Africa to join the Barbary Corsairs, Jeffers was eventually forced to find work as a sailor again. After signing with the brig Vineyard (using the Charles Gibbs alias), he and an accomplice, Thomas J. Wansley (born Milford, Delaware, December 8, 1807), led a mutiny with several others, killing the captain and his first mate on the night of November 23, 1830 in an attempt to seize its cargo of silver.

The mutineers headed for Long Island where they scuttled the vessel and came ashore, several mutineers losing their lives in rough waters which also claimed much of their loot. After only a few days ashore, Jeffers, Wansley, and two others were captured and taken to prison in New York City.

In New York, Jeffers and Wansley were convicted of mutiny and murder in 1831. The prosecuting United States attorneys who tried the case, James Alexander Hamilton and his assistant Philip Hamilton, were both sons of statesman Alexander Hamilton.

Incarcerated at Bridewell Prison and then moved to Bellevue Prison, Jeffers was ultimately hanged with Wansley at Ellis Island on April 22, 1831.

His skull was placed on display in the museum of the General Society of Mechanics and Tradesmen in New York City.

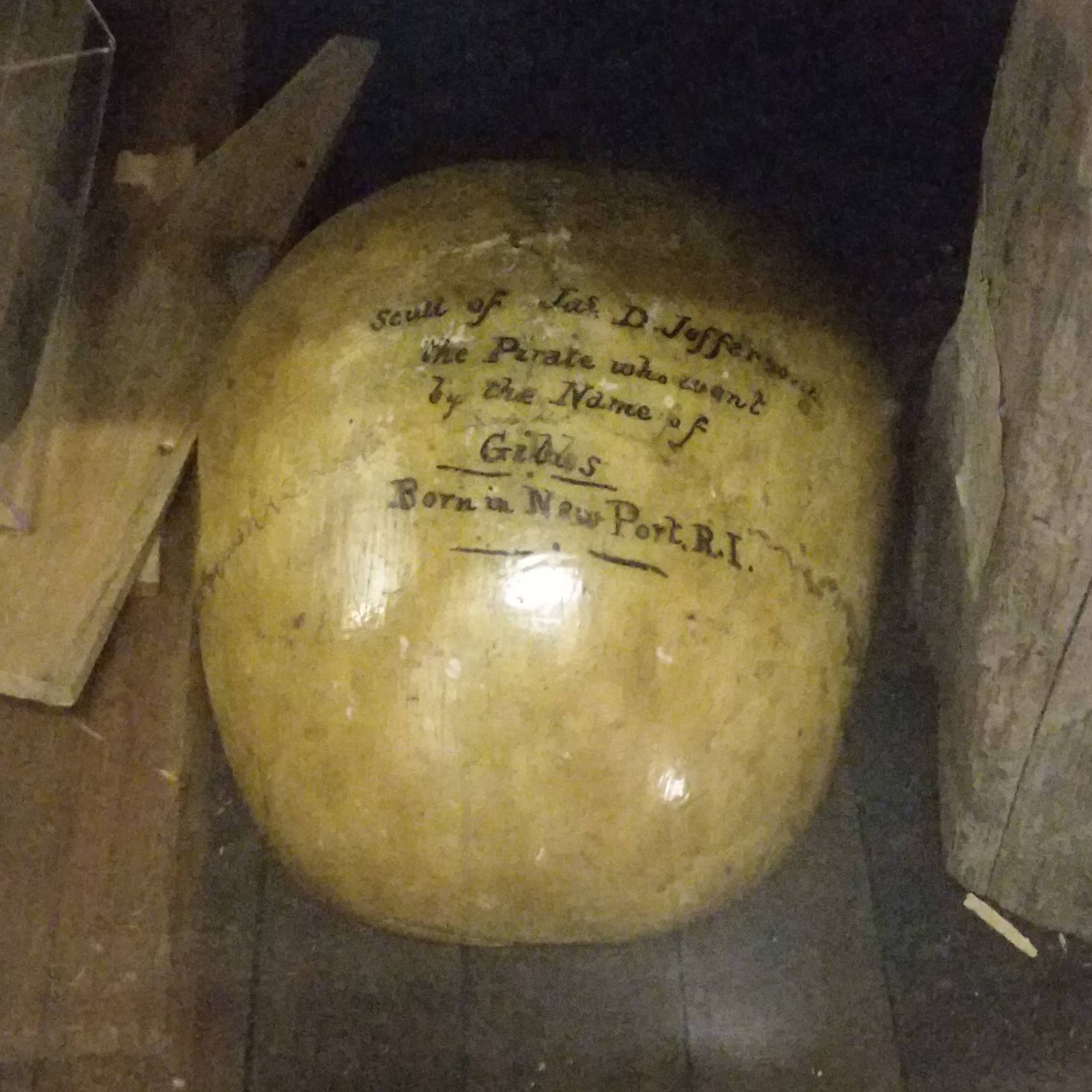
Charles Gibbs' skull on display at the General Society of Mechanics and Tradesmen of the City of New York
