= United States Revenue Cutter Service =

Precursor to the U.S. Coast Guard

United States Division of Revenue Cutter Service
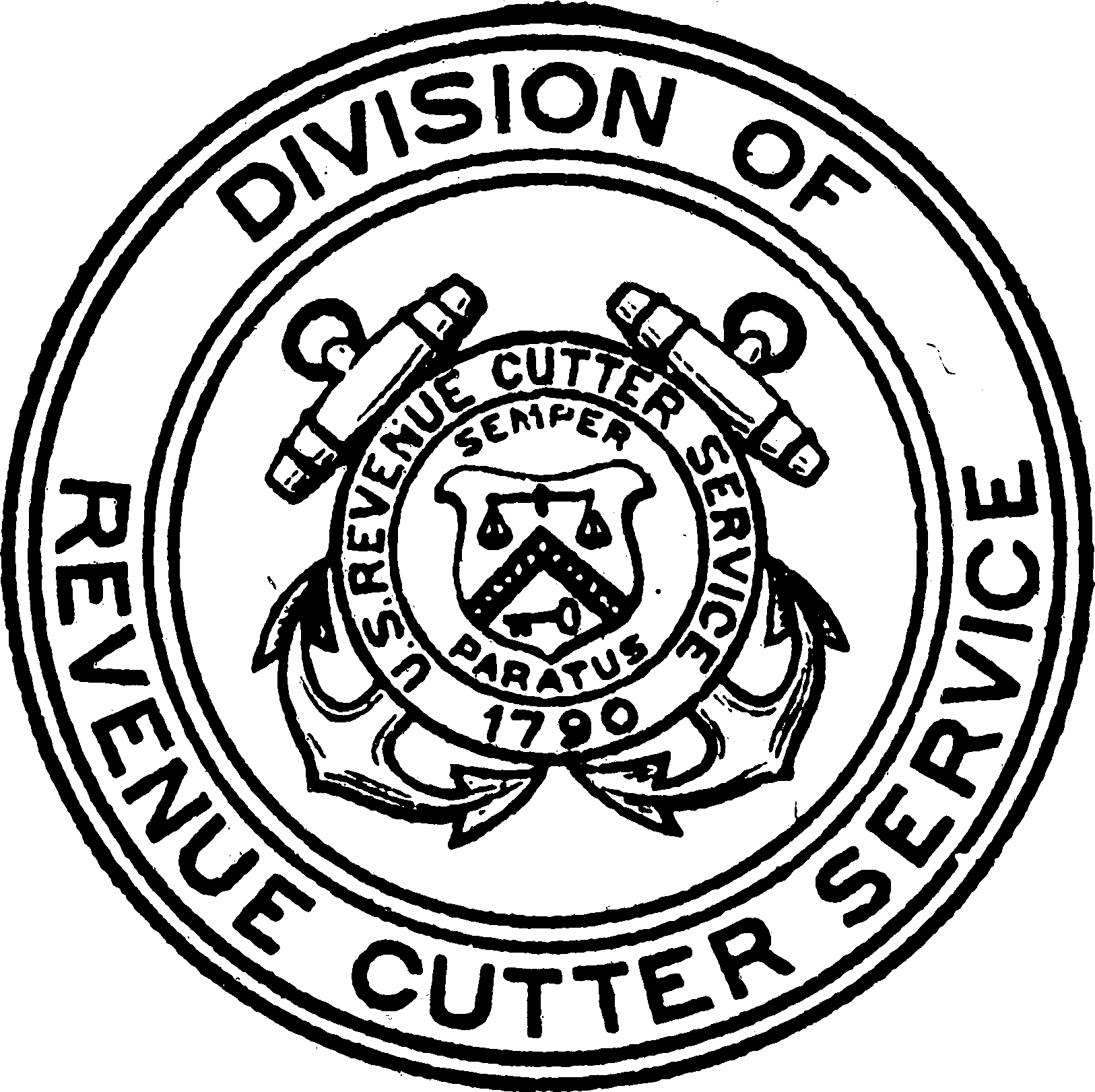
- Seal of the United States Revenue Cutter Service
- Active: 4 August 1790 – 31 July 1894 (as the U.S. Revenue-Marine); 31 July 1894 – 28 January 1915 (as the U.S. Revenue Cutter Service)
- Disbanded: 28 January 1915
- Country: United States
- Role: Maritime law enforcement
- Part of: Department of the Treasury
- Nicknames: "U.S. Revenue-Marine" (1790–1894) "U.S. Revenue Cutter Service" (1894–1915)
- Mottos: "Semper Paratus" (English: "Always Ready")
- Anniversaries: 4 August

Insignia
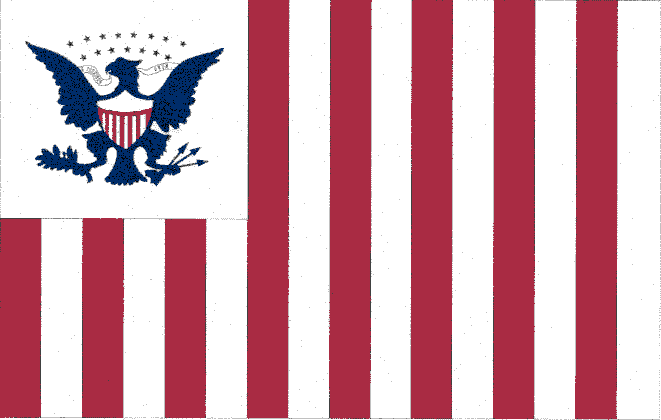
- Ensign (1799)

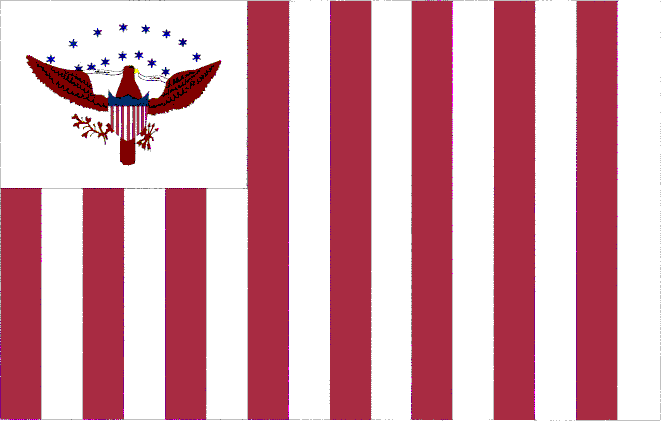
- Ensign (1815)

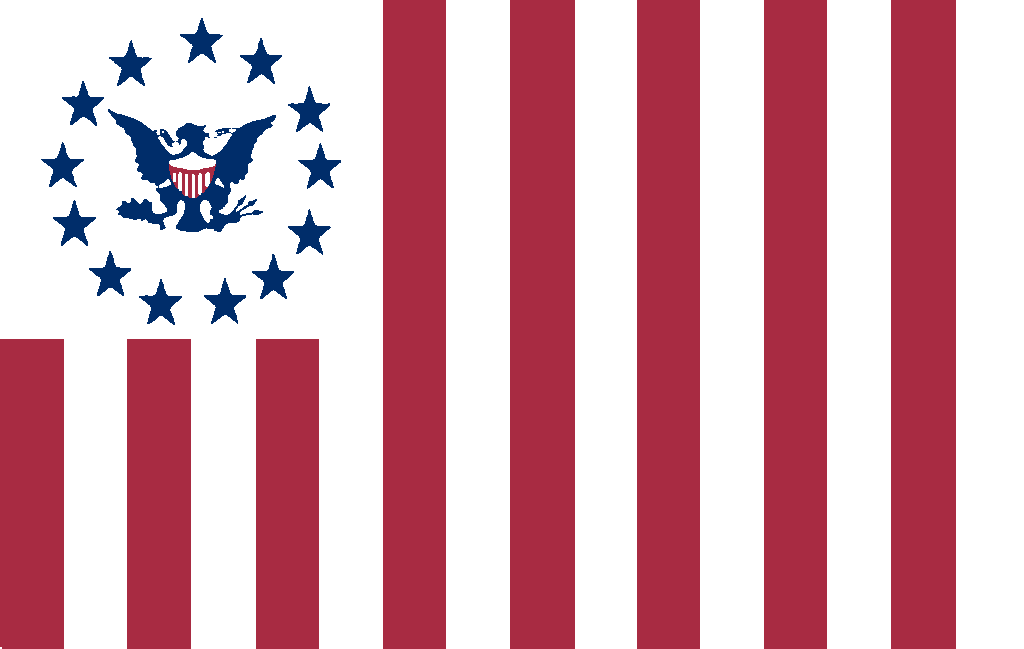
- Ensign (1836)

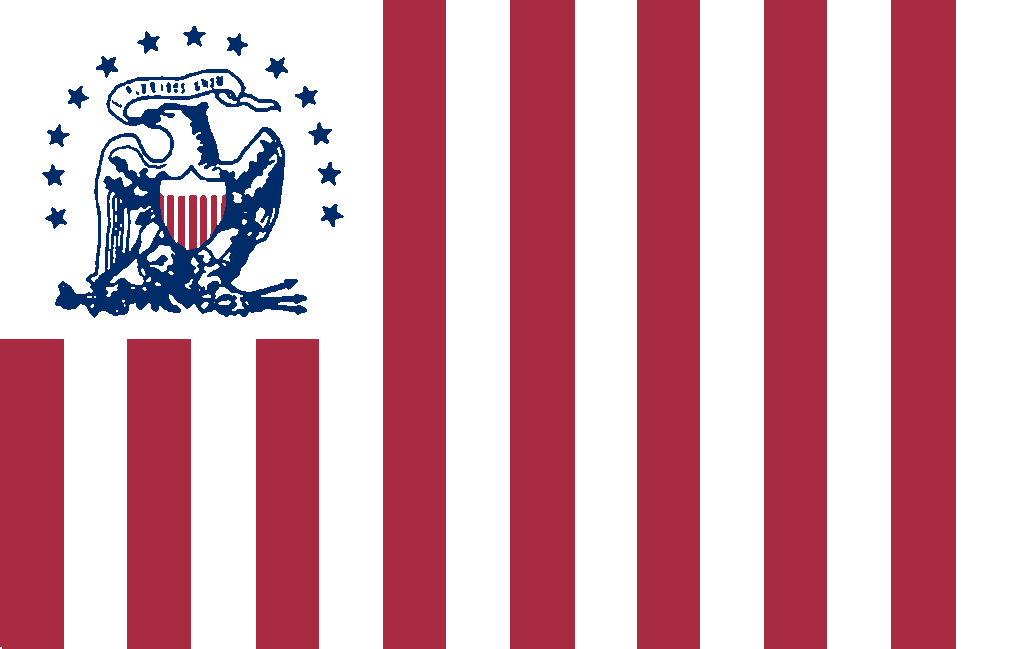
- Ensign (1841)

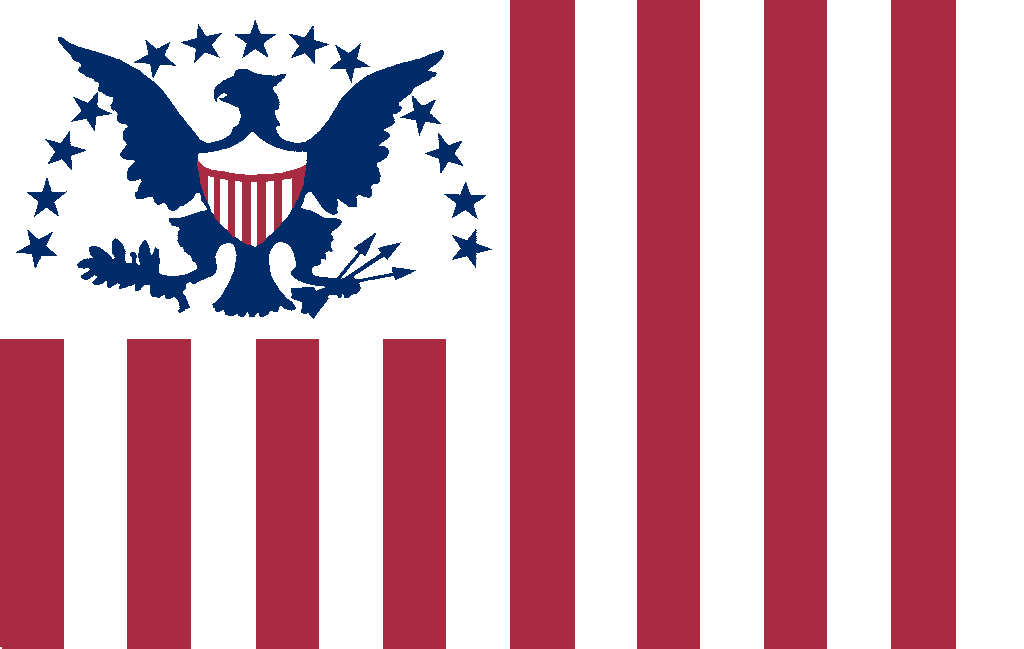
- Ensign (1867)

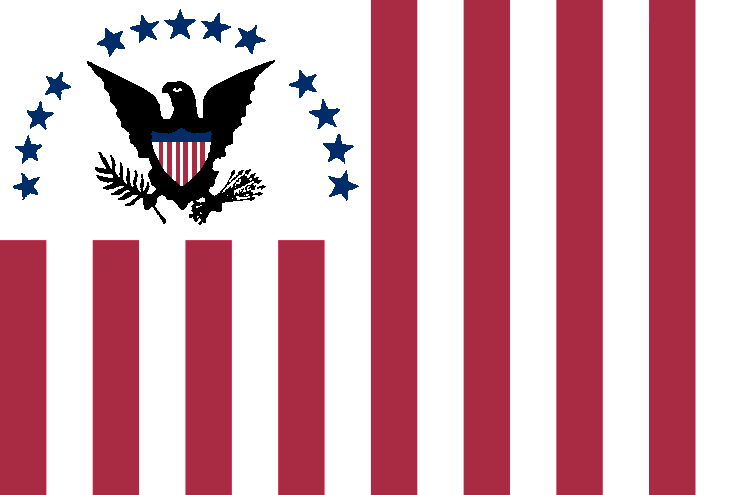
- Ensign (1868)

The United States Revenue Cutter Service was established by an Act of Congress (1 Stat. 145) on 4 August 1790 as the Revenue-Marine at the recommendation of the nation's first secretary of the treasury, Alexander Hamilton.

The federal government body was initially created to serve as an armed customs enforcement service. Over time, however, the service gradually gained missions either voluntarily or by legislation, including those of a military nature. It was generally referred to as the Revenue-Marine until 31 July 1894, when it was officially renamed the Revenue Cutter Service. The Revenue Cutter Service operated under the authority of the U.S. Department of the Treasury. On 28 January 1915, the service was merged by an act of Congress with the United States Life-Saving Service to form the United States Coast Guard.

== Background ==
Immediately after the American Revolutionary War, the newly-established United States struggled financially. The federal government desperately needed revenue, and determined to raise it chiefly from tariffs on imports. Strong enforcement of tariff laws could blunt rampant smuggling.

Urged on by the nation's first U.S. secretary of the treasury, Alexander Hamilton, the U.S. Congress on 4 August 1790 established the Revenue-Marine, later renamed the Revenue Cutter Service by act of July 31, 1894 (28 Stat. 171).

A cutter vessel is a small or medium-sized boat or sailing ship, built for speed and with a shallow draft. While some larger cutters had two or three masts, many cutters had only one, located more centrally on the ship than was typical of larger vessels. In modern times, any naval ship built for speed and agility is still referred to as a cutter.

The Revenue-Marine's enabling legislation required ten vessels built for a "System of Cutters". Two cutters were to be assigned to "the coasts of Massachusetts and New Hampshire; one for Long Island Sound; one for New York; one for the Bay of Delaware; two for the Chesapeake (these of course to ply along the neighboring coasts); one for North Carolina; and one for Georgia". On 21 March 1791, George Washington, the nation's first president, commissioned the first seven masters.

Among those commissioned were Hopley Yeaton and John Foster Williams of Massachusetts, Jonathan Maltbie of Connecticut, Patrick Dennis of New York, James Montgomery of Pennsylvania, Simon Gross of Maryland, and Richard Taylor of Virginia. William Cooke of North Carolina was commissioned on 25 April 1791, Robert Cochrane of South Carolina on 8 May 1791, and 20 May 1791 John Howell of Georgia. Each cutter was constructed where it was to be assigned; a move by Hamilton to satisfy members of Congress and gain their votes for the establishment of the service.

Washington suggested to Hamilton that it would be advantageous to have each master supervise the construction of his own cutter; a suggestion that Hamilton put into use along with a limitation that each cutter cost no more than US$1,000 ($26,041 in 2025). Hamilton's cost restrictions proved unrealistic for three of the new cutters; Massachusetts cost US$2,050, Scammel cost US$1,255, and General Green cost over US$1,500. (Note: Massachusetts was somewhat larger compared to the other nine cutters as it was expected to patrol the coast of Massachusetts during the winter months; it was outfitted differently than the rest. She did not handle well at sea and was "a very dull sailer" according to her master. She was sold on 9 October 1792 and replaced by a small sloop, Massachusetts II launched in June 1793)

The same legislation that established the ten original cutters also provided for the complement and pay scales of the crew of each vessel. Each vessel was provided with a master with pay set at $30 ($781.20 in 2025) per month and three mates at $20, $16, and $14, respectively. In addition, each cutter was allowed four mariners at $8 apiece and two boys at $4.

== History ==
=== Early missions ===
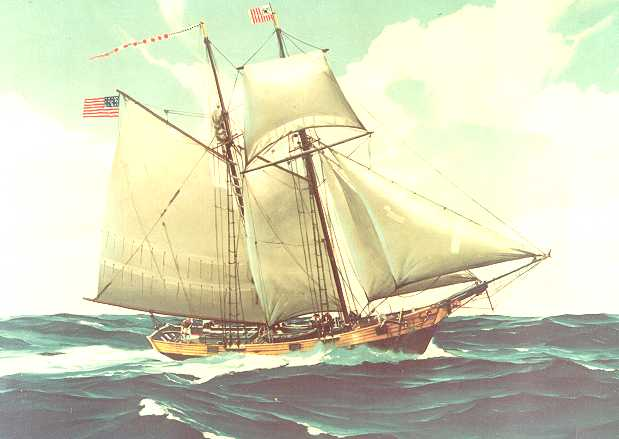
USRC Massachusetts

Between 1790 and 1798, the Revenue-Marine was the only armed maritime service of the United States, as the Continental Navy had been disbanded. Each cutter master was answerable to and received his sailing orders directly from the Collector of Customs of the port to which his ship was assigned. All crew pay, requests for supplies, arrangements for repairs to the cutter, and mission-specific tasking came directly from the port's Customs House. After the Slave Trade Act of 1794 was enacted, the Revenue-Marine began intercepting slave ships which were illegally importing slaves into the United States.

This was the case from 1791 to 1871, excluding 1843 to 1849, when oversight was vested in the Revenue Marine Division of the Treasury Department. Standing orders for individual cutters were stated in general terms, allowing captains to exercise their discretion and judgment to the fullest. Captains also had far-reaching authority "to seize vessels and goods in the cases in which they are liable to seizure for breaches of the Revenue laws" and to send inspection parties aboard vessels already in port to ensure that cargo intended for export also did not violate revenue laws.

Despite this considerable authority, Alexander Hamilton, in his first letter of instruction to the captains, had specifically directed that they "will always keep in mind that their countrymen are freemen, and, as such, are impatient of everything that bears the least mark of a domineering spirit. ... They will endeavor to overcome difficulties, if any are experienced, by a cool and temperate perseverance in their duty – by address and moderation, rather than by vehemence or violence."

=== Quasi-War with France ===
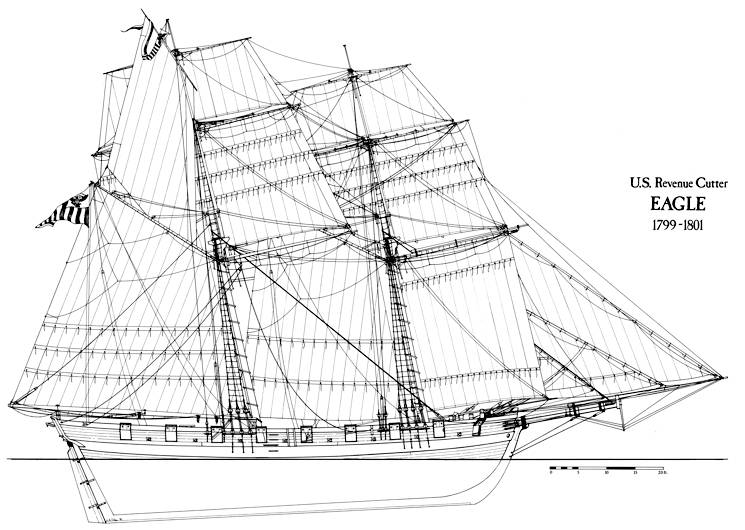
USRC Eagle, which commanded the best wartime record of captures for any U.S. vessel during the Quasi-War

During the Quasi-War with France from 1798 to 1801, the United States Navy was formed and the Revenue-Marine fought alongside the Navy, capturing or assisting in the capture of 20 French ships. Ten of these were captured by the USRC Pickering. Revenue cutters were assigned to enforce the very unpopular Embargo Act of 1807, which outlawed nearly all European trade, import and export, through American ports. The Act was enforced until it was repealed in 1808.

=== War of 1812 ===
In wartime, the Revenue Marine was placed under the command of the United States Navy and the cutters themselves were often placed into military service. USRC Jefferson made the first American capture of a British ship in the War of 1812, capturing the brig Patriot in June 1812. On 3 August 1812, the boats of the British frigates Maidstone and Spartan captured the 6-gun revenue cutter Commodore Barry in the Little River, Bay of Fundy, together with three privateer schooners, Madison, Olive, and Spence (or Spruce). On 22 August 1812, HMS Barbadoes, under the command of Captain Thomas Huskisson, captured the USRC James Madison after a chase of seven hours. The cutter was pierced for fourteen guns but had only ten mounted, two of which she threw overboard to lighten her during the chase. She had a crew of 65 men and was seven days out of Savannah, but had made no captures. Huskisson described her: "[She is] coppered and copper-fastened, is two years old, and sails remarkably fast."

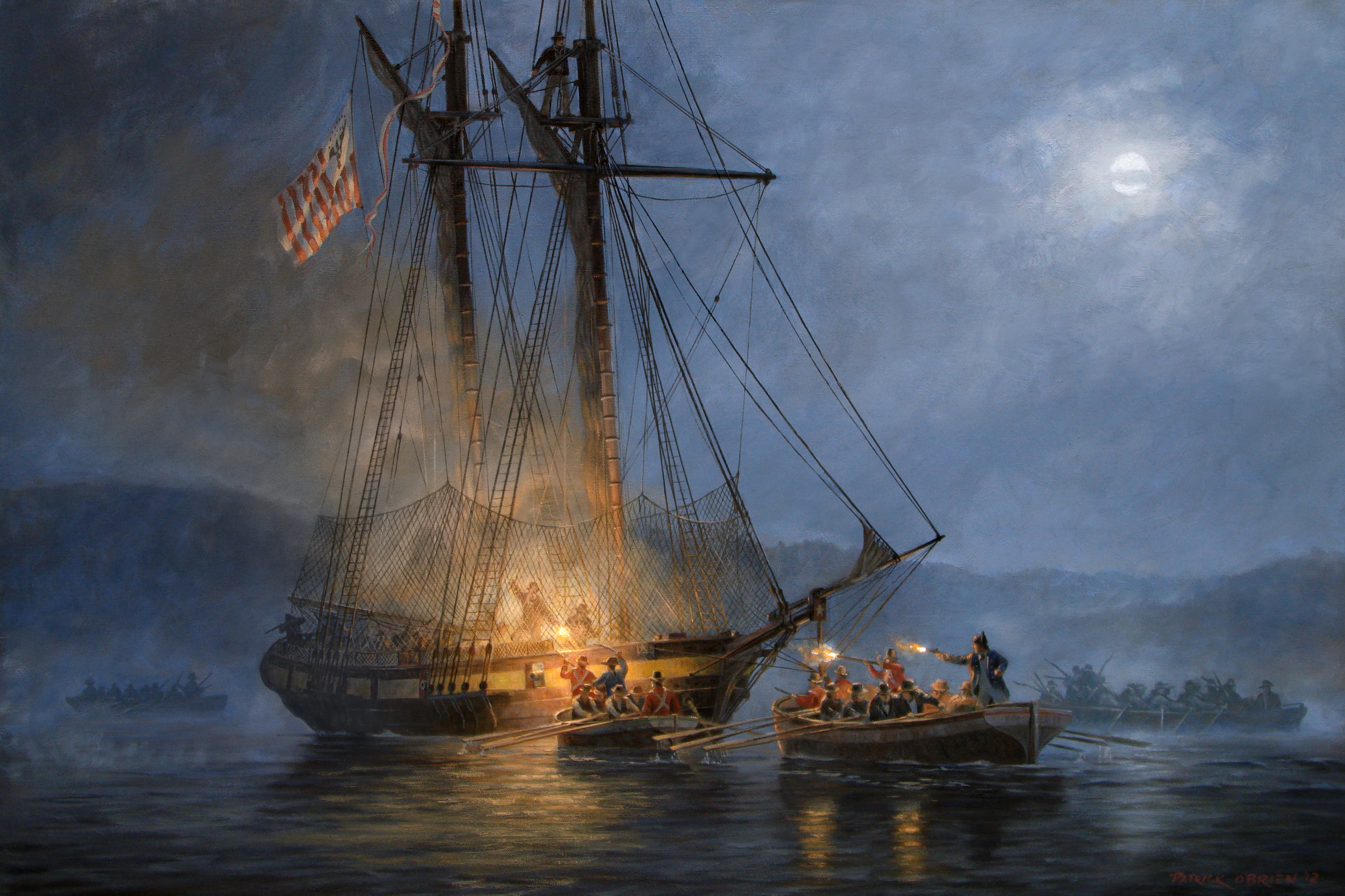
Painting of the capture of USRC Surveyor

On the night of 13 June 1813, the small cutter Surveyor, with a crew of 16 and an armament of only six 12-pounder (5.4 kg) carronades, was anchored in the York River, when a British boarding party from the frigate HMS Narcissus attacked her. The attack came from an angle at which Surveyor could not use her carronades. However, the crew of Surveyor, under Captain William S. Travis, each was armed with two muskets and held their fire until the British boats were upon them. After a fierce hand-to-hand fight that left five Americans wounded and three Britons dead and seven wounded, the British succeeded in capturing Surveyor. Lieutenant John Crerie, first lieutenant of Narcissus and commander of the boats, returned Travis's sword to him in a gesture of respect for his "gallant defense" of Surveyor.

On 11 October 1814, the cutter Eagle encountered Narcissus, and the Cruizer-class brig-sloop Dispatch, which was guarding the Suzan, a captured American merchant ship. The British ship badly outgunned Eagle, which was pierced for 10 guns but only had two mounted. Captain Frederick Lee beached Eagle on Long Island to avoid being sunk. Not yet defeated, the Revenue Marine seamen removed the guns from Eagle, hoisted them up a 160-foot bluff, dragged them into position, and continued firing at Dispatch. The British sent in boats to capture Eagle. When the Americans ran out of cannonballs, they still did not surrender, instead retrieving the cannonballs fired at them by Dispatch and shooting them back. Even after being forced to use the ship's logbook for wadding, the crew, together with local militia, continued to fight. Eventually, the British retrieved Eagle and took her away.

=== Counter-piracy operations ===
During and after the Spanish American wars of independence, Spanish naval power in the Caribbean Sea and Gulf of Mexico weakened, allowing a resurgence of piracy along the Gulf Coast. The West Indies anti-piracy operations of the United States revenue cutters were dispatched to fight the pirates. In 1819, the one-gun schooners USRC Alabama and USRC Louisiana fought two engagements with pirates, one on the open sea and another at Breton Island, Louisiana. On 19 July 1820, Alabama captured four pirate ships off La Balize. In 1822, with USS Peacock and HMS Speedwell, Alabama engaged pirates again, which resulted in the taking of five more pirate ships.

In 1832, Secretary of the Treasury Louis McLane issued written orders for revenue cutters to conduct winter cruises to assist mariners in need, and Congress made the practice an official part of regulations in 1837. This was the beginning of the life-saving mission for which the later United States Coast Guard would be best known worldwide.

=== Mexican–American War ===
Revenue-Marine cutters again served under the U.S. Navy in the Mexican–American War of 1846–1848. The cutters were crucial for shallow-water amphibious assaults.

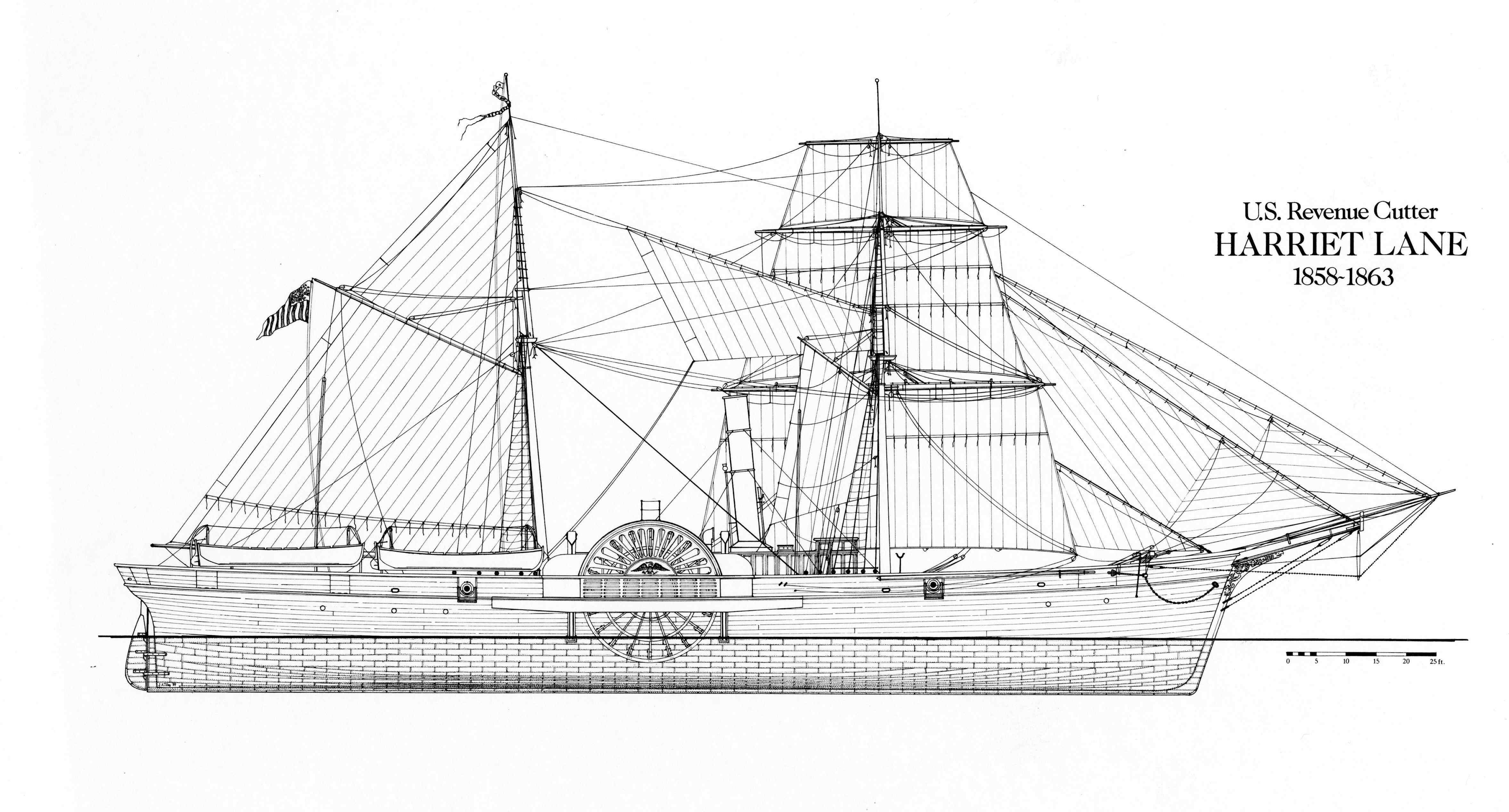
USRC Harriet Lane

=== American Civil War ===
On 11 April 1861, the USRC Harriet Lane fired the first shot of the maritime conflict in the American Civil War of 1861–1865. The cutter fired a shot across the bow of the civilian mail steamship Nashville as it tried to enter Charleston Harbor during the bombardment of Fort Sumter because Nashville was flying no identifying flag. The ship then promptly raised the U.S. standard, and Harriet Lane broke off. Captain John Faunce, skipper of Harriet Lane, gave permission for Nashville to proceed to Charleston harbor and she was promptly seized by the Confederate Navy.

President Abraham Lincoln issued the following order to Secretary of the Treasury Salmon P. Chase on 14 June 1863: "You will co-operate by the revenue cutters under your direction with the navy in arresting rebel depredations on American commerce and transportation and in capturing rebels engaged therein."

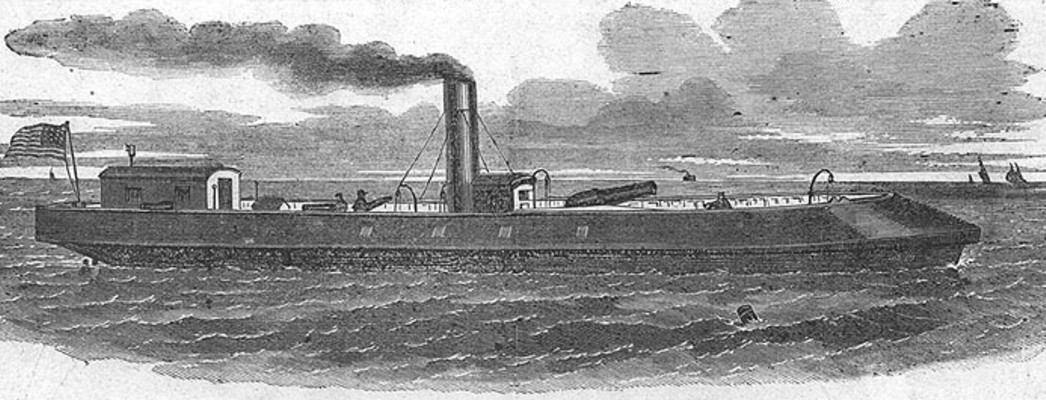
USRC E.A. Stevens

Revenue cutters assisted U.S. Navy operations throughout the war. Harriet Lane joined a federal naval squadron to capture Fort Clark and Fort Hatteras, which served as bases for Confederate blockade runners. USRC E.A. Stevens, a prototype 110-foot semi-submersible ironclad gunboat, in company with USS Monitor, USS Galena, and two other gunboats, participated in the unsuccessful sortie up the James River to Drewry's Bluff to attack the Confederate capital at Richmond. After carrying President Lincoln from Washington on 9 May 1862, USRC Miami assisted navy transports in landing federal troops at Ocean View, Virginia.

In June 1863, in an incident known as the "Battle of Portland Harbor", the revenue cutter Caleb Cushing was captured by Confederate raiders, commanded by Lieutenant Charles Read, CSN, from the CSS Tacony. The Cushing was pursued by two civilian ships carrying a detachment of soldiers from Fort Preble and a number of civilian volunteers. Seeing that capture was imminent, the Confederates abandoned the Cushing in a lifeboat after setting her on fire. The Confederates were captured but the Cushing was destroyed when the gunpowder on the ship detonated.

After President Lincoln was assassinated on 15 April 1865, revenue cutters were ordered to search all ships for any conspirators who might be trying to escape.

=== Post–Civil War operations ===
The increase in coastal trade along the Atlantic seaboard after the civil war and the purchase of Alaska in 1867 had a significant impact on the development of the Revenue Cutter Service. Demands by the public to do something about losses in lives and property at sea prompted Secretary of the Treasury George S. Boutwell, under President Ulysses S. Grant, to reorganize the service. He appointed N. Broughton Devereux on 1 July 1869 as chief of an interim Revenue Marine Bureau that included the Revenue Cutter Service, the Steamboat Inspection Service, the Marine Hospital Service and the Life-Saving Service. Devereaux appointed two boards to study the problems facing the service; one investigated personnel requirements, the other analyzed the requirements for the cutter fleet.

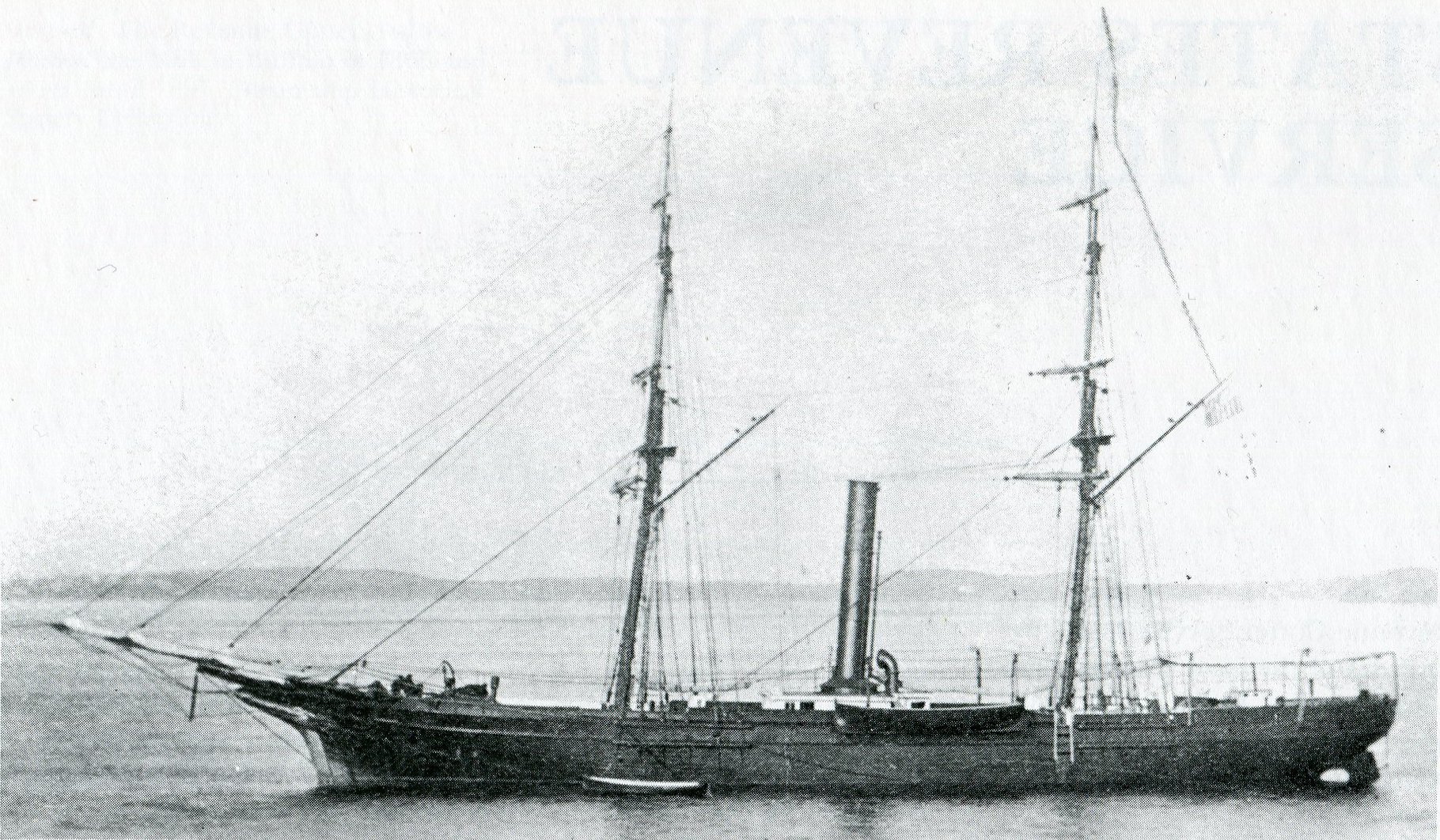
USRC Mahoning, later Levi Woodbury

The fleet board produced a study that was presented to Congress on 26 May 1870, the result of which was that of the twenty-four steaming cutters in the service, four were harbor tugs, six were stationed on the Great Lakes and the remaining steaming cutters were stationed in the Atlantic and Pacific coasts. The harbor tugs were left where they were stationed and all of the lake cutters were recommended for repair and stayed located where they were except for one which was home-ported in a different city. All of the steaming coastal cutters except for two were a successful side-wheel design which were retained. The board recommended keeping only one of the propeller driven steam cutters, the USRC Mahoning. (Note: On 5 June 1873, Mahoning was renamed Levi Woodbury in honor of the supreme court justice of the same name.) Of the twelve sail cutters in the fleet, only five of the most seaworthy were recommended by the board to be retained. Devereaux's report to Congress included a request for four new steam cutters: a large propeller-driven ship, a large side-wheeler and two smaller side-wheelers. Recommendations were made as to the types of engines to be used on various cutters and all were to be equipped with sails to save on coal consumption. Additionally, Devereaux requested $125,000 to cover the unexpected costs of operating cutters Lincoln, Wayanda and Reliance in Alaskan waters during 1869.

The personnel who boarded the Devereaux convened found that the Revenue Cutter Service was rife with abuses through the political control by customs collectors in the ports where the cutters were assigned. It was possible under the structure in place at the time to be appointed by the customs collector to the captaincy of a cutter without having ever served aboard a ship.

Although the Department of the Treasury remained in charge of the service throughout the 19th century, its conventional organization was resumed after the war, with cutters reporting to local customs officials. A new Revenue Marine Division was established in 1871, which became the United States Revenue Cutter Service by an act of 31 July 1894 (28 Stat. 171).

During the harsh winter of 1897–1898, Lieutenant David H. Jarvis of USRC Bear led a relief party to 265 whalers whose ships had been stranded in the ice off the northern coast of Alaska.

=== Spanish–American War ===
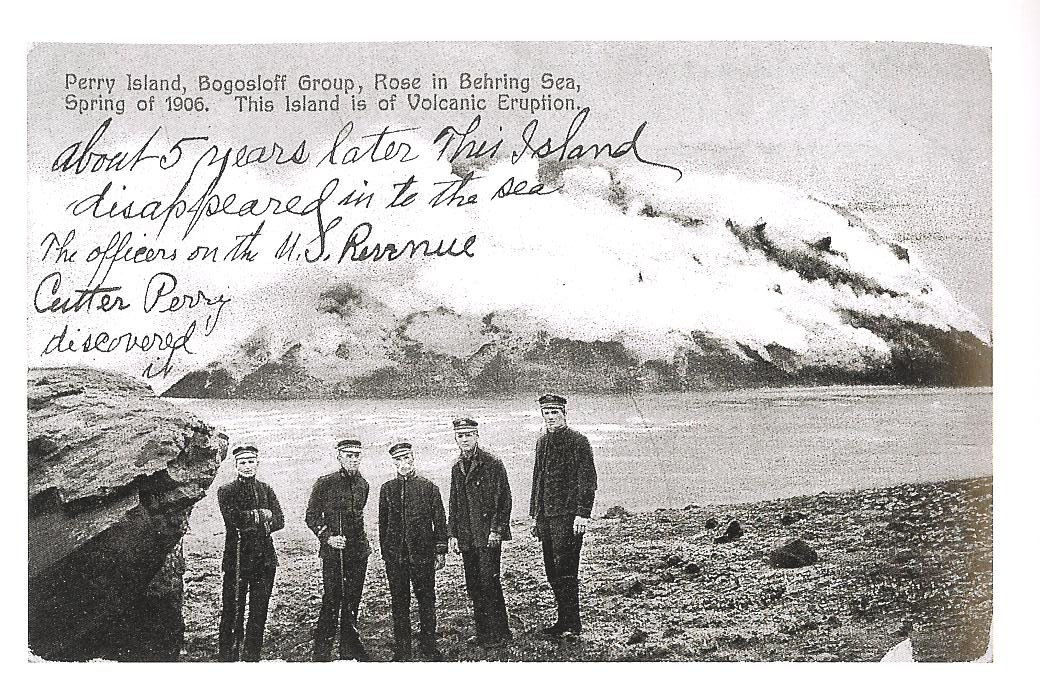
Officers of the revenue cutter Perry in the Aleutian Islands in 1906

With the outbreak of the Spanish–American War in 1898, the Revenue Cutter Service saw plenty of action in both the Cuban and Philippine theaters. Many revenue cutters were assigned to the blockade of Havana Harbor. During the Battle of Manila Bay on 1 May 1898, USRC Hugh McCulloch fought with the American squadron under Commodore George Dewey.

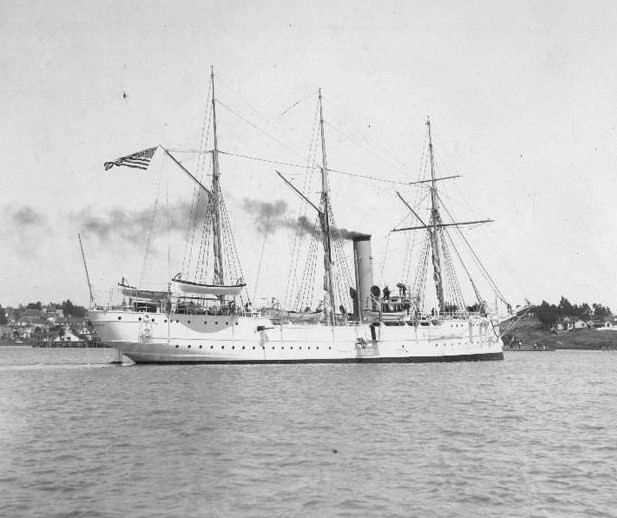
USRC McCulloch

On 11 May 1898, USRC Hudson, equipped with two 6-pounder (3 kg) guns and a machine gun, took part in the Battle of Cárdenas off the coast of Cárdenas, Cuba. Together with Navy torpedo boat USS Winslow, Hudson fought against a Spanish gunboat and coastal batteries until forced to withdraw. Under extremely heavy fire, Hudson towed the disabled Winslow away from the battle. Congress awarded Frank H. Newcomb, the captain of Hudson, a Congressional Gold Medal for his bravery. Each of the officers assigned to Hudson received a silver medal and the enlisted crew received a bronze medal.

== Officer rank structure ==
From the establishment of the Revenue Cutter Service in 1790 until 1799 the officers of the service were called "master" and "mate"; the same terms for officers used on merchant ships. Initially, the masters and mates were commissioned "officers of the customs" under the act, rather than commissioned military officers. The system of cutters authorized by Congress in the 1790 act authorized 10 cutters to be constructed. Each cutter was to be crewed by the master, first, second, and third mates as well as four "mariners" and two "boys" Congress established a military rank structure for the Revenue Cutter Service in a 2 March 1799 act which authorized the use of the terms "captain" and "lieutenant".

The ranks of officers in the Revenue Cutter Service, and later the U.S. Coast Guard, were not made comparable to Navy ranks until 1922. However Navy officers started to complain in 1834 when Revenue Cutter officer's uniforms started to resemble Navy uniforms.

In 1908, Congress established the rank of "captain-commandant" equal to the rank of a U.S. Navy captain and also the rank of "senior captain" equal to a commander. The position of "chief engineer" was established ranking with that of senior captain.

Rank group	General / flag officers					Senior officers			Junior officers
(1790–1799)	No equivalent
(1790–1799)	No equivalent							Master	First Mate	Second Mate	Third Mate
(1799–1863)	No equivalent
(1799–1863)	No equivalent							Captain	First Lieutenant	Second Lieutenant	Third Lieutenant
(1864–1907)	No equivalent
(1864–1907)	No equivalent							Captain	First Lieutenant	Second Lieutenant	Third Lieutenant
(1908–1915)	No equivalent
(1908–1915)	No equivalent					Captain-Commandant	Senior Captain	Captain	First Lieutenant	Second Lieutenant	Third Lieutenant
Navy equivalent	Admiral of the Navy and Fleet Admiral	Admiral	Vice admiral	Rear admiral	Commodore	Captain	Commander	Lieutenant commander	Lieutenant	Lieutenant (junior grade)	Ensign

== Formation of the U.S. Coast Guard ==
President Woodrow Wilson signed into law the Coast Guard Act on 28 January 1915. This act combined the U.S. Revenue Cutter Service with the United States Life-Saving Service to form the new United States Coast Guard. The U.S. Coast Guard assumed the responsibilities of the United States Lighthouse Service in 1939 and the Navigation and Steamboat Inspection Service in 1942.

In 1990, the Commandant of the Coast Guard, Admiral Paul A. Yost Jr. established a military award known as the Coast Guard Bicentennial Unit Commendation, which commemorated the original founding of the U.S. Revenue Cutter Service.

== See also ==
- History of the United States Coast Guard
- United States Coast Guard History and Heritage Sites

== Notes ==
=== References cited ===
- "1790 Tariff Act" (PDF). Historic Documents & Publications. U.S. Coast Guard Historian's Office.
- "Citation for Coast Guard Bicentennial Unit Commendation" (PDF). United States Coast Guard.
- "Mahoning (Levi Woodbury), 1863". Cutter List. U.S. Coast Guard Historian's Office.
- National Archives. "General Records of the Department of Transportation (Record Group 398),1958-92". National Archives.
- Cipra, Dave (March–June 1985). "A history of sea service ranks & titles" (PDF). Commandant's Bulletin. Vol. 85, no. 5–8, 11–12. U.S. Coast Guard Historian's Office.
- Evans, Stephen H. (1949). The United States Coast Guard 1790–1915: A Definitive History. Naval Institute Press, Annapolis, Maryland.
- Johnson, Robert Irwin (1987). Guardians of the Sea, History of the United States Coast Guard, 1915 to the Present. Naval Institute Press, Annapolis, Maryland. ISBN 978-0-87021-720-3.
- Kern, Florence (1990). U.S. Revenue Cutters in the Civil War. Bethesda, Maryland: Alised Enterprises. ISBN 9781907521133.
- King, Irving H. (1989). The Coast Guard Under Sail: The U.S. Revenue Cutter Service, 1789–1865. Naval Institute Press, Annapolis, Maryland. ISBN 978-0-87021-234-5.
- King, Irving H. (1996). The Coast Guard Expands, 1865–1915: New Roles, New Frontiers. Naval Institute Press, Annapolis, Maryland. ISBN 978-1-55750-458-6.
- Larzelere, Alex (2003). The Coast Guard in World War I: An Untold Story. Naval Institute Press, Annapolis, Maryland. ISBN 978-1-55750-476-0.
- Rachlis, Eugene (1961). The Story of the U.S. Coast Guard. Random House Inc., New York, New York.
- Kyle, Joanna R. Nicholls (November 1903). "Our Coast Police: The U.S. Revenue Cutter Service in Its Routine Work And As An Auxiliary to the Navy". Overland Monthly. XLII (5): 371–378.
