= HMS Speedwell (1815) =

History

United Kingdom
- Name: Royal George
- Fate: Sold 1815

United Kingdom
- Name: HMS Speedwell
- Acquired: 1815 by purchase
- Fate: Sold 1834

General characteristics
- Tons burthen: 20332/94 (bm)
- Length: 80 ft 0 in (24.4 m) (overall); 61 ft 2 in (18.6 m) (keel)
- Beam: 25 ft 0 in (7.6 m)
- Depth of hold: 11 ft 3 1/2 in (3.4 m)
- Sail plan: Schooner
- Complement: c.50
- Armament: 1 × 18-pounder gun + 4 × 18-pounder carronades

HMS Speedwell was the mercantile Royal George, which the Royal Navy purchased in 1815 and converted to a 5-gun schooner. During her career in the West Indies, she helped capture or destroy a number of pirate vessels, and capture several slave ships transporting enslaved people. The Royal Navy sold her at Jamaica in 1834.

== Career ==
After her purchase, the Navy spent between 26 August 1815 and 22 March 1816 fitting Speedwell at Sheerness for eventual service as a tender to the flagship in the West Indies. She did sail to the Jamaica Station almost immediately; already on 13 October 1816 the "tender Speedwell" arrived off "Yallaha" as two "Carthaginian" pirate vessels, one a large schooner, were firing on the Betsey as she was sailing to Santa Martha. (Note: In this context "Carthaginian" means insurgent privateers from Carthagena, Colombia.) At Speedwell's arrival on the scene the two privateers broke off their attack and sailed away.

There are also records of Speedwell being on the Jamaica station in 1820 and 1825. In between she worked to suppress piracy, in concert with the United States Revenue Cutter Service.

USS Peacock served in the expedition that included the Revenue Marine schooner USRC Louisiana and the British schooner Speedwell. The trio broke up a pirate establishment at Bahia Honda Key on 28–30 September capturing four vessels. They burnt two and sent the others with prize crews to New Orleans. Eighteen of the captured pirate crew members were sent to New Orleans for trial.

In an action on 2 November 1822, Peacock and Speedwell, together with USRC Alabama, engaged pirates, which resulted in the taking of five pirate ships.

In connection with one or the other of these actions Lieutenant William Geary of Speedwell discovered bills of lading and coffee bags from Vittoria, which pirates had captured and looted some weeks earlier.

Speedwell was acting as a tender to the frigate Sybille, and under the command of Lieutenant W.H.Geary. Speedwell shared with the frigate Tyne in the capture of two pirate schooners on 5 November, Union and Constantia (alias Esperanza), and in the destruction of Hawke and Paz. (Note: A first-class share, that of Captain Geary of Sybille, was worth £277 7s 0d; a sixth-class share, that of an ordinary seaman, was worth £1 17s 5 1/4d. A later payment for the hull and stores of Constantin amounted to £40 13s 0d for a first-class share, and 10s 0 3/4d for a sixth-class share.)

Between 24 March and 24 May 1824, the frigate Hussar, Captain George Harris, and Speedwell, with Icarus in company, destroyed a pirate felucca at the Isle of Pines, Cuba, and captured her crew. (Note: A first-class share of the prize money was worth £90 10s 3d; a sixth-class share was worth 7s 1 1/2d.)

One of these incidents may be the source of the following anecdote. In his confessions before being executed on 11 January 1830 in the military fortress at La Puerta de Terra, San Fernando, a few miles south of Cadiz, the pirate Nicholas Fernandez, recalled an incident:- "We arrived at the coast of Cuba and learned that His Majesty's schooner Speedwell, accompanied by several barges from other vessels of war, was engaged in securing a key near Cayo Romano off the north Coast of Cuba where a number of pirates had secreted themselves in the woods. Some small craft which the pirates used in other cruises, were captured by the barges ... it was expected the pirates would be hunted from their lurking places."

Then on 31 January 1825, Speedwell seized the schooner James. Unfortunately, the prize money notice does not give the reason.

Lieutenant James Cooper Bennett, who had commanded HMS Renegade, commanded Speedwell on 5 March 1826 when she captured the slave ship Orestes, and thereby freed 238 captives. (Note: A first-class share of the prize money was worth £548 16s 6 1/2d; a sixth-class share was worth £28 17s 8 1/4d, or more than a year's wages.) Orestes had grounded near Grass-cut Cay on the Grand Bahama Banks (23°40′N 77°20′W). The crew had taken refuge on one of the Cays, leaving their cptives for several days without food or water. Bennett was unable to get the ship afloat and so took the freed captives aboard Speedwell, as well as the master of Orestes, Don Jose Ramon Munio (or Mutio), the mate, and a passenger. During the voyage to Havana, Don Munio died, as did 26 enslaved people. Speedwell was able to land 212 enslaved people. Orestes had loaded 285 enslaved people on 19 January; in all over a quarter of the enslaved people she had loaded had died.

It is not clear that the Navy formally commissioned Speedwell before 14 April 1826, when Lieutenant Justus Oxenham commissioned her. Lieutenant B. Hutchings took command in August 1828. Lieutenant James Hookey replaced Hutchings in June 1829, and Lieutenant William Warren replace Hookey on 31 August.

On 15 October 1831 Speedwell stopped briefly at Havana. There she reported that she had boarded a slave ship off Trinidad, on the coast of Cuba. However, the ship was sailing under a French flag and so Speedwell had to let her proceed as Speedwell was not authorized to detain French vessels transporting enslaved people.

In 1832, Speedwell captured three ships transporting enslaved people:

Enslaved people rescued

Vessel	Date	Male	Female	Total	Notes
Planeta (Note: A Commander's share was worth £306 12s 0d; a sixth-class share was worth £9 2s 1 1/2d.)	6 April	183	53	236	This was Planeta's third voyage transporting enslaved people.
Aquila (Note: A Commander's share was worth £929 19s 7d; a sixth-class share was worth £25 7s 3d.)	3 June	468	128	596	Brig of 300 tons (bm) and 10 guns.
Indagadora (Note: A Commander's share was worth £234 6s 4 1/2d; a sixth-class share was worth £6 1s 2 3/4d.)	25 June	122	12	134	This may have been the last of some five voyages transporting enslaved people.

Speedwell captured Planeta a few miles south of the Isle of Pines. Planeta, Salvador Feliu, master, had gathered enslaved people along the "River Cameroons" on the Calabar Coast. The British and Spanish Mixed Court of Justice, at Havannah, condemned Planeta on 26 April.

The capture of Aquila took place a few miles east of the Isle of Pines. Under the command of Juan Ferrer y Roig, master, she too had acquired enslaved people on the Calabar Coast. Aquila was substantially larger than Speedwell, and had a crew of 70 men. Aquila fought for an hour before she surrendered. The court in Havannah condemned her on 18 June.

On 25 June Speedwell detained Indagadera a few miles east. She was under the command of her mate, Bartolomé Alemany, her original master, Ramon Casal, having died during the voyage. She had acquired enslaved people from Onis, Rio Lagos. On 1 July two men rowed a boat to Indagadera while she lay in Havannah harbour. They intended to free Alemany, and her boatswain and steward, who were still on board. However, Speedwell's crew were alert; they captured the two men and handed them over to the Spanish admiral of the port. The court condemned Indagadera on 9 July.

These three captures resulted in Warren's promotion to Commander.

== Fate ==
In January 1834 the Navy sold Speedwell at Jamaica for £344 10s.
