= USRC Louisiana =

Ship of the U.S. Revenue Cutter Service

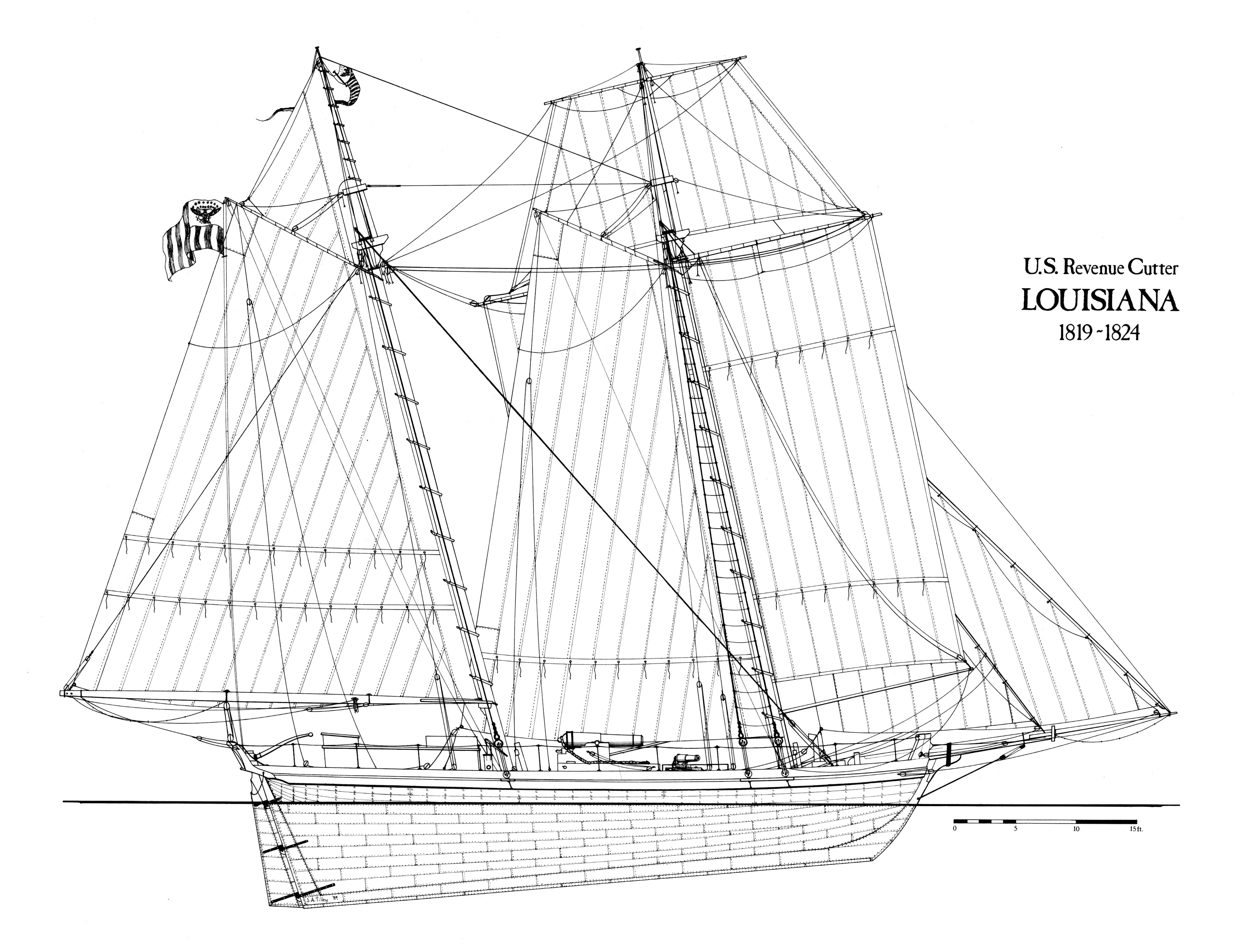
- USRC Louisiana (1819)

History

United States
- Name: USRC Louisiana
- Namesake: U.S. state of Louisiana
- Operator: U.S. Revenue-Marine (Note: The U.S. Revenue Cutter Service was known as the Revenue-Marine during the time Louisiana was in commission.)
- Builder: Christian Bergh, New York City
- Cost: US$4,500
- Completed: Summer, 1819
- Home port: New Orleans, Louisiana
- Fate: sold 24 March 1824 for US$1,040.

General characteristics
- Class & type: Alabama class
- Type: Topsail schooner
- Displacement: 56 tons
- Length: 52 ft 0 in (15.85 m)(keel)
- Beam: 18 ft 6 in (5.64 m)
- Draft: 5 ft 9 in (1.75 m)
- Armament: 1 gun on amidships pivot, caliber unknown (Note: The caliber of amidships gun would have been either 9-pounder, 12-pounder, or 18-pounder.)

USRC Louisiana, was a wooden topsail schooner designed by William Doughty, serving in the United States Revenue Marine from 1819 to 1824. Based in New Orleans, Louisiana, she patrolled the Caribbean extensively, primarily engaging in anti-piracy operations, most notably the capture of the schooner Bravo in 1819.

== Construction ==
On 6 April 1819, the Collector of Customs at New York City was authorized by the Treasury Department to build two cutters, one to be stationed in Louisiana and the other to be stationed at Mobile, Alabama. The cutters were constructed by the Christian Bergh Shipyard at New York City using plans drawn up by naval constructor William Doughty. Doughty designed plans for 31-ton, 51-ton, and 80-ton cutters for the Revenue Marine. The Alabama-class cutters, consisting of Alabama and Louisiana were constructed on the 51-ton plan that measured 56 ft 10 in (17.32 m) on deck, with a 17 ft 4 in (5.28 m) beam, and a 6 ft (1.8 m) depth of hold. Both were rigged as fore-topsail schooners with a square stern, raking masts, and light rails instead of heavy bulwarks. Both cutters were not armed initially, but were designed to accept a pivot gun amidships of a 9-pound to 18-pound capacity.

== Service ==
=== Commissioning ===
After commissioning in New York City, Louisiana was assigned a homeport at New Orleans, Louisiana on 11 August 1819. Louisiana was commanded by Jairus Loomis who was commissioned as the captain.

=== Capture of pirate schooner Bravo ===
While on her voyage to her homeport at New Orleans, on 31 August 1819, Louisiana assisted her sister ship, Alabama in the capture of the pirate vessel Bravo near Dry Tortugas. Bravo initiated the attack on Louisiana with a volley of musketry, during which the first officer and three crewmen were wounded. The pirate ship was owned by Jean Lafitte and commanded by Jean Defarges, one of his lieutenants. (Note: Evans and the Record of Movements uses Lefarge with no first name used in the text.) Bravo had captured the Spanish schooner Filomena with a cargo of flour bound for Havana, Cuba out of Pensacola, Florida. The crew of Bravo were taken to New Orleans to await trial on charges of piracy while the passengers of Filomena were freed and returned to their ship.

=== Breton Island ===
On 19 April 1820, Louisiana and Alabama raided the pirate operating base and stronghold on Breton Island. Both revenue cutters landed crewmen who burned buildings and woods. From Breton Island, both cutters continued westward searching for more pirate bases as part of a plan to eliminate piracy in the Gulf of Mexico. In July 1820, Louisiana captured four pirate craft with about US$4,000 worth of stolen dry goods and a number of black prisoners at a position about 250 mi (400 km) west of Breton Island. The presence of black prisoners suggested that the pirates were engaged in slave trade.

=== Later activity ===
On 18 September 1822, Louisiana assisted the sloop USS Peacock and the British schooner HMS Speedwell with the capture of a pirate schooner in Cuban waters which was reclaimed for a payment of US$1,000 in Havana by the vessel's lawful owners. Eighteen of the captured pirate crew members were sent to New Orleans for trial. Four more pirate vessels were captured by the trio of pirate hunters near Bahia Honda Key later in September, with two being burnt, and the other sent with prize crews to New Orleans. Eighteen of the captured pirate crew members were sent to New Orleans for trial.

In October 1822, Louisiana assisted in the capture of five pirate vessels of 80 to 100 tons each. Two were burnt, the others were sent to New Orleans with prize crews. Only one crew consisting of 17 men were taken to Camp Galvas near Pensacola, Florida; the rest of the vessel's crews managed to escape into the woods.

On 24 March 1824, the Collector of Customs at New Orleans ordered Louisiana sold. She was sold for US$1,040. (Note: Canney claims the Louisiana was possibly renamed Cecil after her sale.)

== Notes ==
=== References used ===
- "Louisiana, 1819". U.S. Coast Guard Historian's Office.
- "Record of Movements, Vessels of the United States Coast Guard, 1790–December 31, 1933" (PDF). U.S. Coast Guard Historian's Office.
- Canney, Donald L. (1995). U.S. Coast Guard and Revenue Cutters, 1790–1935. Naval Institute Press, Annapolis, Maryland. ISBN 978-1-55750-101-1.
- Evans, Stephen H. (1949). The United States Coast Guard 1790–1915: A Definitive History. Naval Institute Press, Annapolis, Maryland.
- King, Irving H. (1989). The Coast Guard Under Sail: The U.S. Revenue Cutter Service, 1789–1865. Naval Institute Press, Annapolis, Maryland. ISBN 978-0-87021-234-5.
- Laliberte, Daniel A. (April 2017). "Twilight of the Gulf Coast Pirates". Naval History. U.S. Naval Institute.
