= USRC Alabama =

Ship of the U.S. Revenue Cutter Service

History

United States
- Name: USRC Alabama
- Namesake: U.S. state of Alabama
- Operator: U.S. Revenue Marine (Note: The U.S. Revenue Cutter Service was known as the Revenue Marine during the time Alabama was in commission.)
- Builder: Christian Bergh, New York City
- Cost: US$4,500
- Completed: June 1819
- Homeport: Mobile, Alabama
- Fate: Sold 6 August 1833

General characteristics
- Class & type: Alabama-class schooner
- Displacement: 56 tons
- Length: 52 ft 0 in (15.85 m) (Keel)
- Beam: 18 ft 6 in (5.64 m)
- Draft: 5 ft 9 in (1.75 m)
- Armament: 1 gun on amidships pivot, caliber unknown (Note: The caliber of amidships gun would have been either 9-pounder, 12-pounder, or 18-pounder.)

USRC Alabama, was a wood-hull topsail schooner designed by William Doughty that was commissioned in the United States Revenue Marine from 1819 to 1833. Assigned the homeport of Mobile, Alabama, she sailed the Caribbean extensively with her sister ship, USRC Louisiana and was used mainly in anti-piracy activity.

== Construction ==
On 6 April 1819, the Collector of Customs at New York City was authorized by the Treasury Department to build two cutters, one to be stationed in Louisiana and the other to be stationed at Mobile, Alabama. The cutters were constructed by the Christian Bergh Shipyard at New York City using plans drawn up by naval constructor William Doughty. Doughty designed plans for 31-ton, 51-ton, and 80-ton cutters for the Revenue Marine. The Alabama-class cutters, consisting of Alabama and Louisiana were constructed on the 51-ton plan that measured 56 ft 10 in (17.32 m) on deck, with a 17 ft 4 in (5.28 m) beam, and a 6 ft (1.8 m) depth of hold. Both were rigged as fore-topsail schooners with a square stern, raking masts, and light rails instead of heavy bulwarks. Both cutters were not armed initially, but were designed to accept a pivot gun amidships of a 9-pound to 18-pound capacity.

== Service ==
After commissioning in New York City, Alabama was assigned a homeport at Mobile, Alabama on 11 August 1819.

=== Capture of pirate schooner Bravo ===
While on her voyage to her homeport at Mobile, on 31 August 1819, Alabama assisted her sister ship, Louisiana in the capture of the pirate vessel Bravo near Dry Tortugas. Bravo initiated the attack on Louisiana with a volley of musketry, during which the first officer and three crewmen were wounded. The pirate ship was owned by Jean Lafitte and commanded by Jean Defarges, one of his lieutenants. (Note: Evans and the Record of Movements uses Lefarge with no first name used in the text.) Bravo had captured the Spanish schooner Filomena with a cargo of flour bound for Havana, Cuba out of Pensacola, Florida. The crew of Bravo were taken to New Orleans to await trial on charges of piracy while the passengers of Filomena were freed and returned to their ship. Following the action, Alabama was temporarily assigned at New Orleans on 20 October.
