= HMS Monkey =

Several vessels of the Royal Navy have been named HMS Monkey.

- HMS Monkey (1801) was a gun-brig of 12 guns, built 1801 in Rochester and wrecked 25 December 1810 near Brittany.
- HMS Monkey (1821) was a paddle tug.
- HMS Monkey (1826) was a schooner assigned to the West Indies squadron, launched 1826 and wrecked in 1831 near Tampico.
- HMS Monkey (1831) was the merchant schooner Courier, built 1827, and purchased in October 1831 at Bermuda and renamed Monkey. She remained in service as a tender to HMS Blossom until sold out in August 1833.
- HMS Monkey (1837) was a steam-powered paddle packet acquired from the Post Office in 1837 and converted to a tug in 1845. She was sold in 1887
- HMS Monkey (1896) was a dockyard water tank vessel launched 21 December 1896 and assigned to Malta until sunk by German aircraft on 26 April 1942.
