= Francis Liardet =

British Royal Navy captain

Captain Francis Liardet
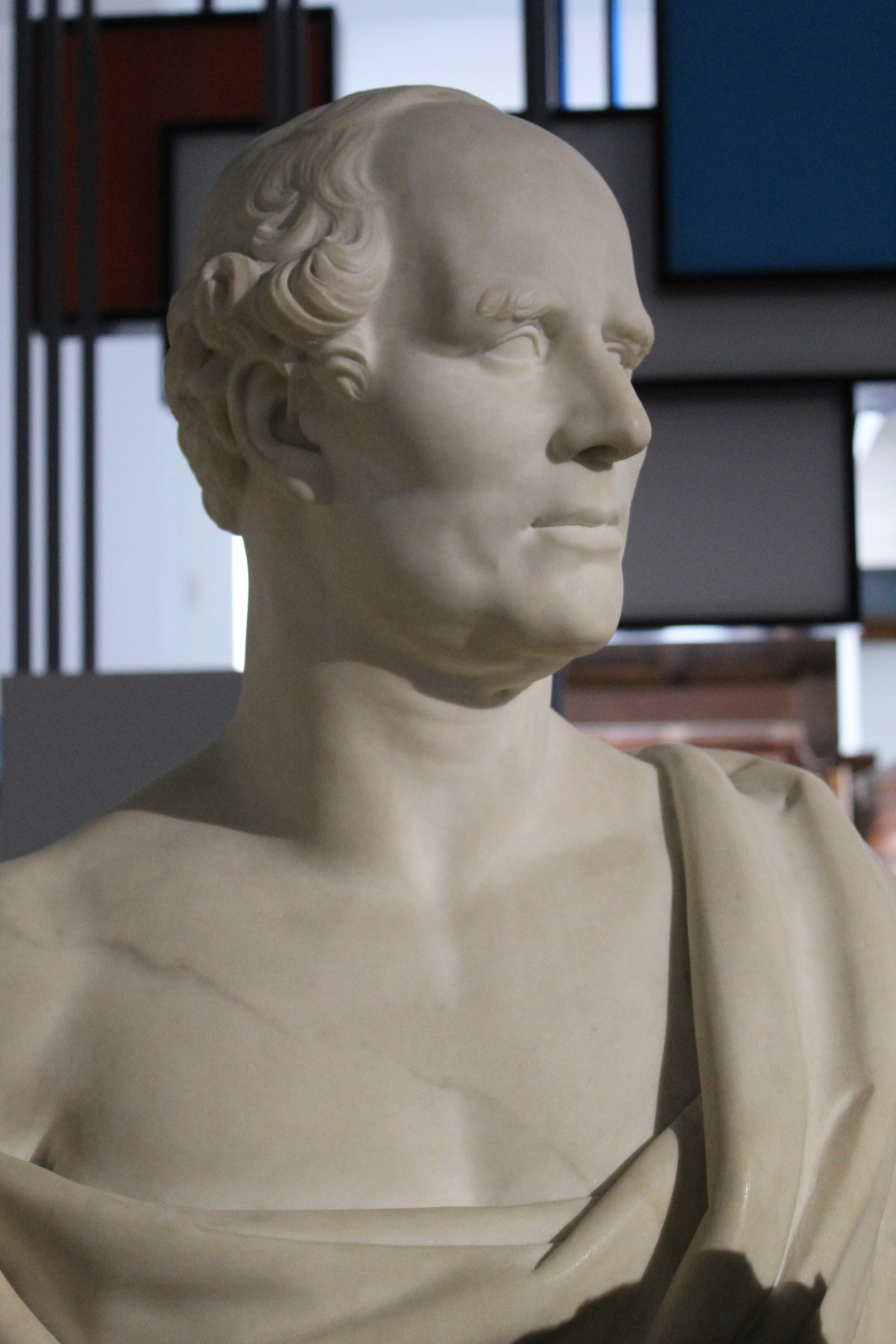
- Francis Liardet by Thomas Milnes, c.1863. National Maritime Museum
- Born: 14 June 1798; Chelsea, London
- Died: 1 March 1863 (aged 64); Royal Hospital, Greenwich, London
- Burial place: Mausoleum of the old cemetery, Greenwich
- Spouse: Caroline Anne Filmer (m. 1842)
- Children: 3
- Military career
- Allegiance: United Kingdom
- Branch: Royal Navy
- Service years: 1809–1863
- Rank: Captain
- Served on: HMS Mercury, 1809– HMS 1809, 1810– HMS Warrior, 1814– HMS Forester; HMS Hyperion, 1821– HMS Union; HMS Lion, 1824– HMS Procris, 1827– HMS Jaseur, 1828–1832; HMS Snake, 1833– HMS Cleopatra, 1835– HMS Powerful, 1839–1841; Military Department, Royal Hospital at Greenwich, 1856–1863
- Commands: HMS Lion, 1824-
- Campaigns: War of 1812; Escape of HMS Belvidera, 1812; Suppression of Piracy; Abolition of the Slave Trade; Egyptian–Ottoman War; St Jean d'Acre, 1840
- Awards: Naval General Service Medal; Royal Humane Society Medal, 1832; Royal Humane Society Medal, 1834; St Jean d'Acre Medal 1840
- Memorials: Old Royal Naval College Chapel, Greenwich
- Other work: Agent for New Plymouth, New Zealand Company

Captain Francis Liardet (14 June 1798 – 1 March 1863) was a Royal Navy officer.

== Biography ==
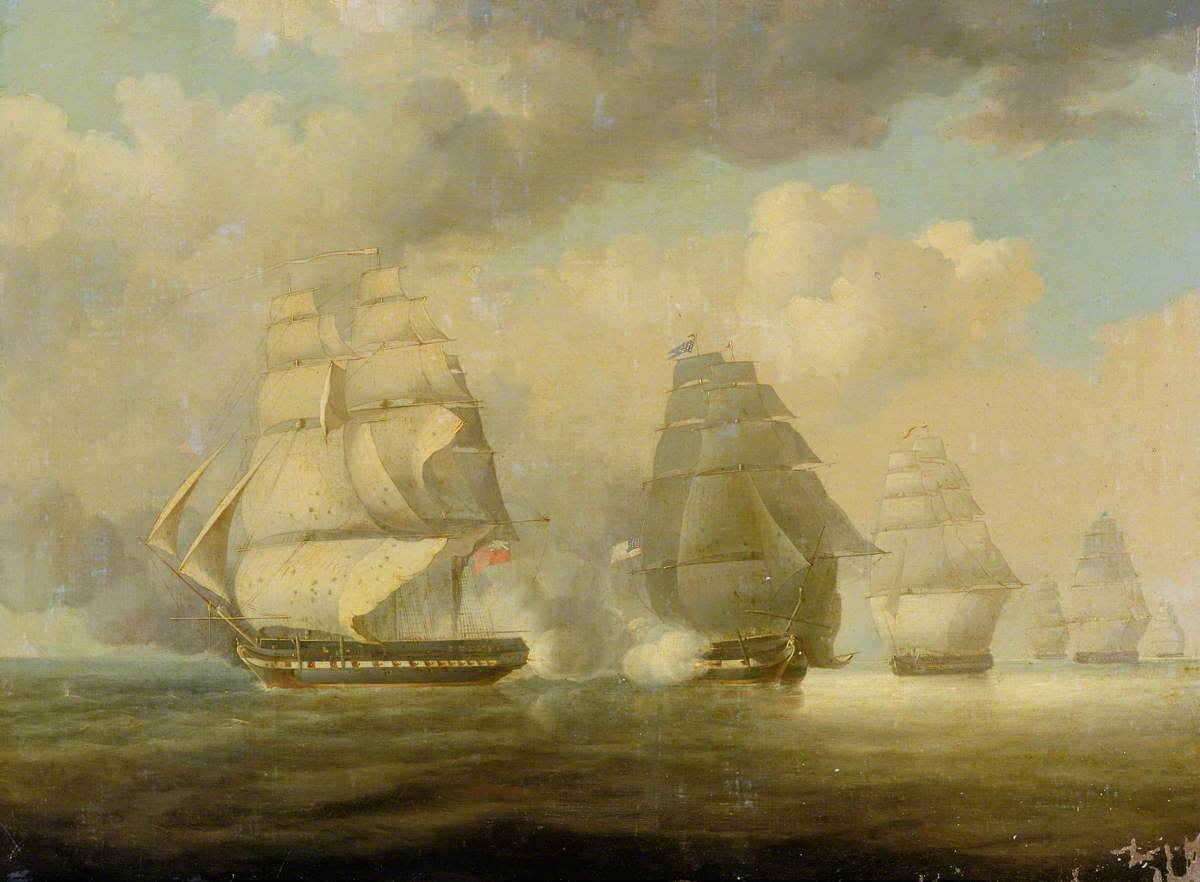
Escape of HMS Belvidera, 23 June 1812. Royal Museums Greenwich

Liardet was the second son of John Liardet by the Lady Perpetue Catherine de Paul de Lamanon d'Albe. He was born at Chelsea, London on 14 June 1798. He entered the navy in 1809, on board HMS Mercury, frigate, with Captain the Hon. Henry Duncan, in the Mediterranean. In March 1810 he was transferred to HMS Belvidera, frigate, with Captain Richard Byron, on the coast of Africa, and afterwards on the North American station, and was slightly wounded in her running fight with and escape from the United States' squadron under Commodore John Rodgers on 23 June 1812. After an active commission the Belvidera was paid off in October 1814, and for the next two years he served in the West Indies on board HMS Warrior and HMS Forester, sloop. After the peace he devoted himself for some time to the study of mathematics and navigation, and in 1819 went a voyage to the East Indies as mate of a merchant ship. In May 1821 Liardet was appointed to HMS Hyperion of 42 guns, going out to the Cape of Good Hope, and afterwards to the West Indies, where he was moved into HMS Union, schooner, employed in the suppression of piracy, in which service he was severely wounded, 25 July 1823. On 18 March 1824 he was promoted to the rank of lieutenant, and followed Lieutenant Commander William Hobson to command HMS Lion, schooner, from 18 March 1824, employed in the same service. In her he destroyed several nests of pirates on the coast of Cuba, captured nine of their vessels, some of their prizes, and a slaver. He was first lieutenant of HMS Procris, attending on the Duke of Clarence, then lord high admiral, in 1827–1828, and of HMS Jaseur at the Cape of Good Hope from 1828 to 1832, in which period he was three times officially reported as having saved life by jumping overboard, once in a sea abounding in sharks. From 1833 to 1835 he was first lieutenant of HMS Snake on the South American station, and from 1835 to 1838 of HMS Cleopatra, frigate, under Captain George Grey.

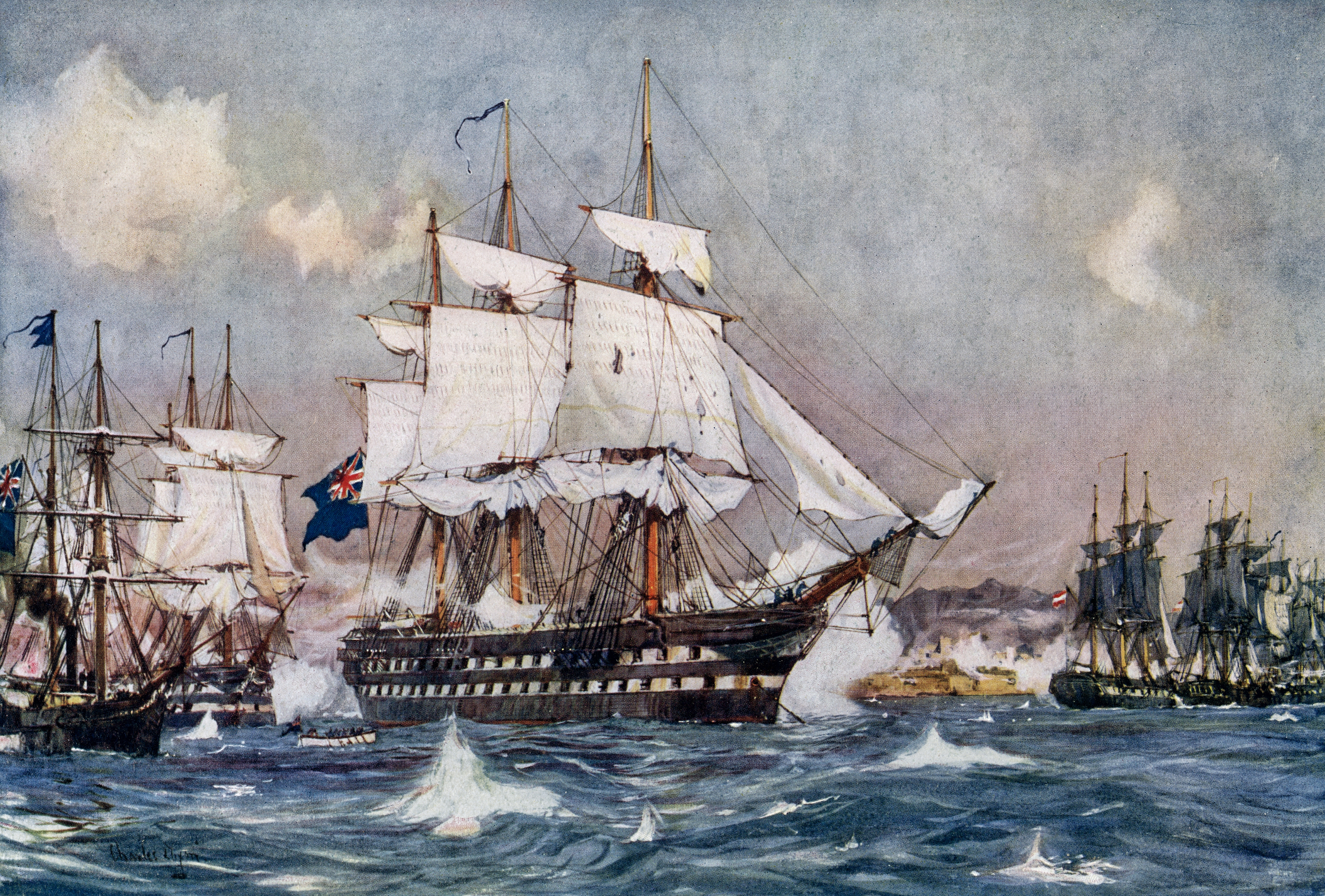
HMS Powerful at the Battle of St Jean d'Acre. Artist: Charles Edward Dixon

On 28 June 1838 he was promoted to be commander, and on 12 January 1839 he was appointed to HMS Powerful of 84 guns, carrying the broad pennant of Commodore Napier, as second in command in the Mediterranean, on the coast of Syria, and especially at the bombardment of St. Jean d'Acre. For his services during this time, when he was frequently in actual command of the Powerful, the commodore being employed on shore, Liardet was promoted to post rank 4 November 1840.

In the following year he accepted an appointment as agent for the New Zealand Company at New Plymouth, Taranaki. He arrived at Wellington on the barque Whitby with Captain Arthur Wakefield, RN, on Saturday, 18 September 1841. and sailed for New Plymouth by the schooner Regina, on 27 September.

On 29 November, whilst he and several others endeavoured to clear a rusty old 4-pounder in preparation for an expected attack by Māori, an untimely explosion of the charge destroyed his sight in one eye and seriously injured the other. For several years, he was almost completely blind. In February 1842, he left Taranaki for Sydney, before returning to England.

During his enforced retirement, he wrote or dictated Professional Recollections on points of Seamanship, Discipline, &c., published in 1849, and The Midshipman's Companion, published in 1851. In January 1856, he was appointed one of the captains of the Military Department, Royal Hospital at Greenwich. He also published Friendly Hints to the Young Naval Lieutenant in 1858. He died in the hospital on 1 March 1863, and was buried in the mausoleum of the old cemetery. A marble bust sculpted by Thomas Milnes, presented to the Royal Hospital by his late wife and children, is on display in the Sea Things Gallery, National Maritime Museum, Greenwich, London.

In October 1842 Liardet married Caroline Anne, sister of Sir Edmund Filmer, bart., and widow of Lieutenant John Jervis Gregory, R.N., and had two daughters and a son.

== Publications ==
- Liardet, Francis (1849). Professional Recollections on Points of Seamanship, Discipline, &c. Portsea: William Woodward, Common Hard.
- Liardet, Francis (1851). The Midshipman's Companion. Portsea: William Woodward, Common Hard.
- Liardet, Francis (1858). Friendly Hints to the Young Naval Lieutenant. London: Longman, Brown, Green, Longman, & Roberts.
