= HMS Renegade =

History
- Launched: 1820, United States
- Renamed: Zaragozana
- Captured: 31 March 1823

United Kingdom
- Name: HMS Renegade
- Acquired: 1823 by purchase of a prize
- Fate: Sold 1 January 1826

General characteristics
- Tons burthen: 115, or 120 (bm)
- Length: Overall: 76 ft 5 in (23.3 m); Keel: 59 ft 10 1/4 in (18.2 m)
- Beam: 1): 19 ft 2 in (5.8 m); 2): 19 ft 0 in (5.8 m) (for tonnage)
- Depth of hold: 7 ft 4 in (2.2 m)
- Complement: Pirate: 70–75; Royal Navy:35, or 37
- Armament: Pirate: 1 × 18-pounder gun on a pivot mount + 4 × 9-pounder guns + eight swivel guns.; Royal Navy; 1): 2 × 12-pounder + 2 × 32-pounder carronades; 2): 2 × 12-pounder carronades + 2 × 32-pounder guns on pivot mounts

HMS Renegade was a schooner built in the United States in 1820, or possibly even earlier. She had been the pirate ship Zaragozana operating out of Havana that the British Royal Navy captured on 31 March 1823, and took into service. The Navy sold HMS Renegade in January 1826.

== Zaragozana ==
Zaragozana may originally have been a slaver, or a privateer. A slave ship named Zaragozana, Brooks, master, sailed from Bristol, Rhode Island, and on 15 November 1815 arrived at Havana from Africa with 204 slaves.

On 18 November 1816 the Spanish guarda costa Valencey, Captain Varines, together with the schooner Zaragozana, arrived at the wreck of HMS Tay on the east side of Scorpion Reef (Spanish: Arrecife Alacranes; 22°26′N 89°40′W). After the Spaniards had verified that all the crew were safely on Crane's Island, they proceeded to demand, at gunpoint, that Captain Roberts and his crew surrender and deliver over their arms and any specie on board Tay. Roberts surrendered, declaring he and his men "prisoners of war", a status the Spaniards acknowledged. They then proceeded to loot Tay of her stores and provisions. The Spaniards also recovered about $350,000 in specie. (An early report of her loss stated that Tay had $2 million in specie on board. Zaragozana then took off Tay's complement.

Some records report that a Zaragozana, of five guns and 75 men, was one of four privateers under the Spanish flag that the Consulado of Havana fitted out in 1817. Between 1821 and 1824, as one officer of the Royal Navy put it, Cuba became a "grand depot of piracy".

In the battle the USS Alligator attached some pirate schooners and their prizes In the short, but sharp, fight, Alligator lost her commanding officer, Lieutenant William H. Allen, wounded mortally by two musket balls. Soon thereafter, boats from Alligator captured all the pirate vessels except one schooner that managed to escape. The pirate vessel may have been Zaragozana. Her captain, Cayatano Arogonez (or Cayetano Aragonés), boasted after his capture that it was he who had killed Lieutenant Allen.

On 10 February 1823 Saragozana entered the port of Nuevitas and there took the American schooners Lady's Delight, of Baltimore, and Lively, of Philadelphia. The pirates treated the masters and crews badly before permitting them to go ashore, destitute.

In March 1823 Admiral Sir Charles Rowley ordered HMS Tyne and Thracian to search for Zaragozana. The two cruized for some 400 miles along the coast of Cuba. On an island in the harbour of Nerangos they found 1100 casks of wine and spirits that pirates had looted from vessels they had captured. (Note: This cargo was afterwards condemned and sold at Jamaica for £6000. Had Walcott not identified the cargo as having come from pirates, Tyne would have been entitled to the full proceeds of the sale. Instead, the government took two thirds, leaving only £2000 to be shared.)

On 31 March Tyne, under Captain John Edward Walcott and Thracian, under Commander John Walter Roberts, were off Baracoa when they saw Zaragozana. Walcott immediately had both men-of-war disguise themselves as merchant vessels by setting their sails in a slovenly manner, and sailing casually towards the schooner. The subterfuge worked for three hours, but then the schooner hurried towards the harbour of Mata. The British abandoned their subterfuge and set off in chase under full sail.

At 1:30p.m. Zaragozana anchored with her broadside facing the entrance to the harbour. Captain Arogonez had also landed some of his men, armed with small arms, who took up position in the trees close to the shore of the harbour. Walcott decided to send in four boats from his ships to attack the schooner. He took command of the boats, which held 47 men in all. At 3pm the boats were within gunshot of Zaragozana, which opened fire, as did the men on shore. It took about three-quarters of an hour for the British boats to reach Zaragozana, having endured the fire from the schooner and shore all the way. As the British boarded Zaragozana, some of the pirates fled ashore. Even so, the British took 29 prisoners, including Arogonez.

British casualties amounted to one man killed and five wounded. The pirates lost 10 men killed and 15 wounded. Troops that the Governor of Baracoa had sent captured 16 pirates that had escaped to shore. The British took their prisoners with them to Port Royal, where they arrived on 9 April. The initial report in Lloyd's List gave British casualties as three killed and six wounded. It described Zaragozana as being of 130–140 ton (bm), armed with one 18-pounder and three 9-pounde guns, and six swivel guns, and having a crew of 80–90 men. The report further stated that Zaragozana had previously captured a French vessel carrying wine. One hundred casks were on board Tyne and Thracian, as well as some 700–800 casks that had been found on shore.

Arogonez and 23 of the pirates were tried and hanged on 22 and 23 May on Gallows Point. Walcott also reported that the Governor of Baracoa had stated that he would deal with the men his troops had captured.

The Royal Navy took Zaragozana into service as the 4-gun schooner HMS Renegade. (Note: In March 1830 the Admiralty disbursed a final payment for the capture. A first-class share was worth £21 1s 7d; a sixth-class share, that of an able seaman, was worth 9s 4½d.)

== HMS Renegade ==
Renegade's first commander was Lieutenant John Harvey Boteler, who supervised her arming and crewing, and then sailed on a cruize during which she engaged in affreightment. (Note: The Navy permitted captains to carry "freight" in the form of merchants' remittances. The captains earned a commission of one per cent or so of the value. Unlike in the case of prizes, the crew did not share in the proceeds.) He came from HMS Gloucester, whose captain, George Frederick Rich, made the appointment. Boteler commanded Renegade for about three months before invaliding back to England in September.

In September Lieutenant William Edward Fiott took command of Renegade at Jamaica. letters from Jamaica dated 9 September 1823 reported that Renegade, Lieutenant Fiott, had her mainmast shattered by lightning that also killed one man.

United States papers reported that on 20 March 1824 Lieutenant Fyatt, of Renegat, (ex-Saragozana) had fired a shot at the brig Caroline, Jones, master, for failure to heave-to during a calm while she was repairing her sails while she was on her way from Savanna to Havana. On 27 March Fyatt had fired on the schooner Allen, Dunham, master, off St Nicholas Mole. Reportedly, British officers at Havan had described Fyatt as "half-crazy".

A court martial at Port Royal acquitted Lieutenant Fiott on 6 May 1824 of charges brought against him by one of his men.

Lieutenant Joseph O'Brien was appointed to command Renegade on 10 October 1824. Towards the close of 1824, Lieutenant Henry Ommaney Love was appointed to the command of the schooners Union and Renegade. He was invalided in the summer of 1825. Lieutenant James Cooper Bennett apparently replaced Love circa March 1825. In July Lieutenant H.Breedon (acting) was in command of Renegade. On 30 August 1825 Lieutenant Charles Elliot took command temporarily, Bennett being ill. Elliot came from Union. Breedon may have assumed command in October.

During her service, Renegade shared with five other vessels, three like her captured pirate ships, in convoy escort duties and suppression of piracy and the slave trade. The two former pirate ships were Lion (ex-La Gata), and Assiduous (ex–Jackal). There were also two purchased vessels, Speedwell (ex-Royal George), and Union (ex-City of Kingston).
