= New Zealand Herald and Auckland Gazette =

Defunct New Zealand newspaper

The New Zealand Herald and Auckland Gazette was Auckland's first newspaper. It ran from July 1841 to January 1842, until it offended Governor William Hobson so much it was closed down. It is not related to the current New Zealand Herald, which was first published in 1863.
