= Officer in Charge =

Officer in Charge (usually "OIC") is a very widely used term which may refer to:

- Duty officer
- Officer in Charge (Philippines), interim position in the context of Philippine governance.

== See also ==
- Officer Commanding ("OC")
- Commanding officer ("CO")

== Notes ==
- In British Commonwealth armies, the OC is often a Major, and the CO a Lieutenant Colonel
