= HMS Magpie (1826) =

Schooner of the Royal Navy

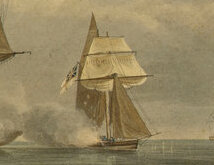
- Magpie's sister ship HMS Monkey

History

United Kingdom
- Name: Magpie
- Ordered: 16 July 1825
- Builder: McLean, Jamaica
- Launched: June 1826
- Commissioned: June 1826
- Fate: Wrecked, 27 August 1826

General characteristics
- Class & type: Magpie-class schooner
- Tons burthen: 70 (bm)
- Length: 53 ft 3 in (16.2 m) (gundeck); 40 ft 8 1/4 in (12.4 m) (keel)
- Beam: 18 ft (5.5 m)
- Depth of hold: 7 ft 3 in (2.2 m)
- Complement: 35
- Armament: 2 × 9-pounder guns; 2 × 18-pounder carronades

HMS Magpie was a 4-gun Magpie-class schooner of the Royal Navy. She was launched at Jamaica in June 1826 as the lead ship of the class. Her design was based on that of HMS Assiduous. While searching for pirates off the coast of Cuba on 27 August Magpie capsized in a squall. Only nine men from her crew of thirty-five survived the initial wreck. Clinging to one of the ship's boats, three men were killed by shark attacks, and a further four died from the heat and lack of water before the boat was discovered on 29 August, rescuing the final two survivors.

== Design and construction ==
Magpie was a 4-gun Magpie-class schooner. The class, made up of three vessels, was ordered on 16 July 1825 by Vice-Admiral Sir Lawrence Halsted, the commander-in-chief of the West Indies Station. The class was modelled after the 2-gun schooner HMS Assiduous, a pirate vessel that the Royal Navy captured in 1823 and subsequently operated at Jamaica to combat piracy.

All three ships of the Magpie class were contracted to be built by the shipbuilder McLean of Jamaica. Magpie, whose date of being laid down is not recorded, was launched in June 1826. (Note: Alternatively, the Jamaican Royal Gazette reported on Saturday 22 April that Magpie was launched from the Shepherds yard, Port Antonio, "on Saturday".) The class was designed with the following dimensions: 53 feet 3 inches (16.2 m) along the gun deck, 40 feet 8 1/2 inches (12.4 m) at the keel, with a beam of 18 feet (5.5 m) and a depth in the hold of 7 feet 3 inches (2.2 m). The ships measured 70 tons burthen.

Magpie, crewed by thirty-five men, was armed with two 9-pounder long guns and two 18-pounder carronades. Of the three ships of the class, only Magpie and her sister ship HMS Monkey were accepted into Royal Navy service; the third ship, Nimble, was declined as unsatisfactory upon delivery and sent back to McLean. The cost of Magpie and Monkey combined was £2,438.

== Service ==
Magpie was commissioned in early June by Lieutenant Edward Smith. On 16 June the ship was sent out to the Havana Old Channel to rescue the crew of the merchant ship The Brothers, which had been wrecked on 4 June on a reef. On 16 August Magpie was in company with the 18-gun sloop HMS Pylades when they chased the slave ship Minerva into Havana. Minerva landed her 200 slaves during the night; the captain general there refused to seize the ship and halt her activities, and as such Magpie and Pylades were unable to take any action against the slaver.

Magpie was cruising off the Colorados Archipelago of Cuba on 27 August searching for pirates, when at about 8 p.m. storm clouds were sighted coming off from Cuba. As the ship was becalmed, the officer of the watch ordered Magpie's sails shortened in order to weather the expected storm, but before this could be completed a strong squall hit the schooner. Magpie quickly capsized onto her larboard side. Her hatchways, left open, allowed sea water to rush into the vessel and she quickly sank. Most of the crew were immediately drowned. Only nine men, including Smith, survived by hanging on to some spars that had come loose, and an upturned ship's boat.

The survivors succeeded in righting the boat, which was full of water. Several men climbed into the boat to start bailing out the water, while the others clung to its sides. They were unable to empty the boat, and in the morning of 28 August a group of sharks began attacking the men in the water. Two were killed, while Smith had his legs badly bitten and died later in the day. The six remaining men continued in the boat, forced to let it drift with the current while they suffered from extreme tropical heat and a lack of drinking water. Four more died, including two who swam away while delirious, before at 6 a.m. on 29 August the boat was located by the American merchant brig Aspasia off the coast of Matanzas, rescuing the final two crew members. They, Boatswain's mate Maclean and Gunner's mate Meldrum, were transferred the following morning to the British merchant brig Laura which took them into Havana, from where the survivors joined Pylades.
