= HMS Tyne (1814) =

History

United Kingdom
- Name: HMS Tyne
- Namesake: River Tyne
- Ordered: 18 January 1813
- Builder: Robert Davy, Topsham
- Laid down: August 1813
- Launched: 20 May 1814
- Fate: Sold January 1825

United Kingdom
- Name: Tyne
- Owner: Daniel Bennett & Sons
- Acquired: 1825 by purchase
- Renamed: William (1825)
- Fate: Lost early 1827

General characteristics
- Class & type: Conway-class sixth rate
- Tons burthen: 390, or 44567/94, or 471 (bm)
- Length: Overall:108 ft 0 in (32.9 m); Keel:89 ft 9 1/4 in (27.4 m)
- Beam: 30 ft 6 5/8 in (9.3 m)
- Depth of hold: 9 ft 01/4 in (2.7 m)
- Complement: 155
- Armament: Upper deck: 18 × 32-pounder carronades; QD: 6 × 12-pounder carronades; Fc: 2 × 6-pounder guns + 2 × 12-pounder carronades

HMS Tyne was launched at Topsham in 1814 as a Conway-class sixth rate. She served in the East Indies and in the Pacific Squadron. She also served in the Caribbean, cruising against pirates, during which she captured the pirate schooner Zaragozana. In 1825 the Navy sold Tyne and she became the whaler William. She was lost in early 1827 in the Bonin Islands on her first voyage to the British southern whale fishery.

== Royal Navy ==
Captain John Harper commissioned Tyne on 12 November 1814. He sailed for the East Indies on 22 November. On 26 December Tyne arrived at Madeira. The next day she sailed for the Brazils, Cape of Good Hope, and India.

Captain Charles Allen replaced Harper in command of Tyne from 19 June 1815 until he gave up command in 1816 to be invalided back to England. Captain John Bartholomew Hoar Curran took command in March 1816.

Tyne sailed from Madras on 29 June 1816, Isle of France (Mauritius) on 23 September, and the Cape of Good Hope on 25 October. She arrived at Portsmouth on 28 December. At Île de France she seized two French vessels, Esperanza and Telemaque, for violation of the navigation laws. She had also seized for engaging in slave trading several vessels based in Port Louis sailing under British colours. When Tyne arrived at Portsmouth she was accompanied by Catalina, of Tortola, that had been sailing from St Thomas to Pernambuco when Tyne had detained her.

On 29 December Happy Restoration arrived at Ilfracombe. She had been sailing from Havana to Africa when Tyne had detained her. On 3 January 1817 a gale hit Portsmouth. Catalina, Stavely, master, was on the Split Bank and had to cut her cables and anchor and run into port.

On 24 June 1817 Captain Gordon Thomas Falcon assumed command.

She arrived at Rio on 25 November. On 22 December she sailed for the River Plate. On 13 March 1818 Tyne returned to Rio from Buenos Aires. From there, on 4 April, she sailed with HMS Andromache and HMS Blossom (1806) to Valparaiso to establish the Royal Navy's new Pacific Squadron. Tyne arrived at Valparaiso on 15 October and left at the end of the month to return to Rio. On 15 January 1819 Tyne sailed from Rio or the River Plate and arrived at Buenos Aires on 26 January. She visited Montevideo and returned to Buenos Aires on 5 February. On 23 September Tyne arrived at Rio from the River Plate. On 26 February Tyne sailed to Lima from Valparaiso; on 26 March Tyne arrived at Valparaiso from Lima. Tyne to Portsmouth, arriving on 16 October 1820. Falcon had carried £700,000 in specie. (Note: The Navy permitted captains returning to Britain to carry "freight" in the form of remittances. The captains earned a commission of one per cent of the value, half of which they kept and half of which went to the Greenwich Hospital (London); unlike in the case of prizes, the crew did not share in the proceeds.)

Between January and May 1821 Tyne underwent repairs and fitting at Portsmouth. Captain James White recommissioned her in February for the West Indies. On 8 October Tyne sailed from Portsmouth for Rio de Janeiro. On 13 November she arrived at Barbados from Madeira and Portsmouth, and on 22 November she was at Jamaica. On 9 January 1822 she arrived at Havana from Campeachy. On 7 May she again arrived at Havana from Campeachy. On 1 August Tyne sailed from Jamaica as escort to a convoy to Liverpool via Havana.

In 1822 Captain G.Godfrey replaced White. In May Captain John Edward Walcott was appointed to replace Godfrey, but could not take up his appointment until December.

In the meantime, in September merchants at Nassau equipped two sloops to cruise against pirates, with Tyne proving officers and seamen to man the sloops. One sloop, Eliza, of 40 tons (bm), armed with one 18-pounder carronade, with 23 men under the command of Admiralty Mate Hugh Nurse and Midshipman George White, encountered the pirate schooner El Diabelito and the felucca Firme Union. On 29 September Eliza anchored near Guanaha. The next day Firme Union and the El Diabelito came up and attacked Eliza. Eliza was able to come up to the felucca and the British boarded and captured her. The schooner then sailed off. The British killed 10 pirates and captured four; those of the felucca's 37-man crew who were not killed jumped overboard and were drowned. British casualties amounted to two men killed and seven, including Nourse, wounded. Firme Union had been armed with one long 6-pounder and four 4-pounder guns. El Diabelito had a crew of about 40 men and six guns. (Note: The various accounts differ in some details regarding armaments, the number of pirates, and casualties.)

The second sloop had a worse fortune. The sloop Whim, of 43 tons (bm) was under the command of Lieutenant William Hobson and two midshipmen from Tyne when on 29 September a pirate schooner captured her at Guanaha. The pirates held the British captive for several days, treating their prisoners badly, but all the British survived. The pirates had prepared to hang Hobson and his crew of 20 men but then relented. However, some of the pirates involved were among the men Tyne (or possibly Eliza) had captured and were later hanged. This lack of reciprocity on the part of the British enraged the pirate captain Cayatano Arogonez, captain of Zaragozana (or Zaragonaza), who vowed to hang any British naval personnel he captured.

Tyne shared with HMS Speedwell, which was acting as a tender to the frigate Sybille, in the capture of two pirate schooners on 5 November, Union and Constantia (alias Esperanza), and in the destruction on 9 November of Hawke and Paz. (Note: A first-class share was worth £277 7s 0d; a sixth-class share, that of an ordinary seaman, was worth £1 17s 5 1/4d. A later payment for the hull and stores of Constantin amounted to £40 13s 0d for a first-class share, and 10s 0 3/4d for a sixth-class share.)

In March 1823 Admiral Sir Charles Rowley ordered Walcott to take Tyne and Thracian to search for Zaragozana. The two cruized for some 400 miles along the coast of Cuba. On an island in the harbour of Nerangos they found 1100 casks of wine and spirits that pirates had looted from vessels they had captured. (Note: This cargo was afterwards condemned and sold at Jamaica for £6000. Had Walcott not identified the cargo as having come from pirates, Tyne would have been entitled to the full proceeds of the sale. Instead, the government took two thirds, leaving only £2000 to be shared.)

On 31 March Tyne and Thracian were off Baracoa when they saw Zaragozana. Walcott immediately had both men-of-war disguise themselves as merchant vessels by setting their sails in a slovenly manner, and sailing casually towards the schooner. The subterfuge worked for three hours, but then the schooner hurried towards the harbour of Mata. The British abandoned their subterfuge and set off in chase under full sail.

At 1:30p.m. Zaragozana anchored with her broadside facing the entrance to the harbour. Captain Arogonez had also landed some of his men, armed with small arms, who took up position in the trees close to the shore of the harbour. Walcott decided to send in four boats from his ships to attack the schooner. He took command of the boats, which held 47 men in all. At 3pm the boats were within gunshot of Zaragozana, which opened fire, as did the men on shore. It took about three-quarters of an hour for the British boats to reach Zaragozana, having endured the fire from the schooner and shore all the way. As the British boarded Zaragozana, some of the pirates fled ashore. Even so, the British took 29 prisoners, including Arogonez.

British casualties amounted to one man killed and five wounded. The pirates lost 10 men killed and 15 wounded. Troops that the Governor of Baracoa had sent captured 16 pirates that had escaped to shore. The British took their prisoners with them to Port Royal. There Arogonez and 23 of the pirates were tried and hanged. Walcott also reported that the Governor of Baracoa had stated that he would deal with the men his troops had captured.

Zaragonaza, of 120 tons (bm), was armed with one long 18-pounder gun on a pivot mound, four long 9-pounder guns, and eight swivel guns. The Royal Navy took her into service as the 4-gun schooner HMS Renegade, which it sold in 1826.

In May Walcott invalided back to England and Commander John Walter Roberts replaced him. On 16 June, Roberts received promotion to post captain.

On 6 July 1823 HMS Lion and Union, and boats of Tyne captured a pirate felucca.

On 23 December Captain Roberts sailed Tyne for England. He was carrying 500,000 dollars and a quantity of cochineal for some merchants.

Disposal: The "Principal Officers and Commissioners of His Majesty's Navy" offered "Tyne, of 26 guns and 446 tons", "Lying at Portsmouth" for sale on 27 January 1825. Robert Pitman purchased Tyne there on the 27th for £1,280.

Court Martial: On 16 July 1825 a court martial rendered a verdict on Lieutenant James Campbell, of Tyne. On 31 March 1823 he had commanded her pinnace during the attack on Saragozana. He had been charged with one count of disobeying Walcott's orders by not using "all possible endeavours" in the attack, and one count of cowardice. The court martial acquitted Campbell of the charge of cowardice, but did find him guilty of not using all possible endeavours and sentenced him to be put at the bottom of the list of lieutenants for two years.

== Whaler ==
Tyne first appeared in the Register of Shipping (RS) in 1826.

Year	Master	Owner	Trade	Source
1826	Younger	Bennett & Co.	London–South Seas	RS; new deck and topsides 1825

The vessel then appeared in Lloyd's Register (LR) in 1826 as William.

Year	Master	Owner	Trade	Source
1826	Younger	Bennett & Co.	London–South Seas	LR; good repair 1825

Both registers showed the vessel being built in Topsham, with the RS giving her launch year as 1814, while LR did not assign a year.

William, Younger, master, sailed from London on 1 July 1825, bound for the British southern whale fishery. She was reported to have been on her way to Patagonia on 30 August. The next report, on 20 June 1827, was that the south seaman William had been lost in the Bonen Islands. The logbook of the United States whaler Atlantic, of Nantucket noted that on 3 May 1827, Atlantic had found two men in the Bonin Islands with 400 barrels of oil. The oil had come from the wreck of William, of London. The whaler Fanny was sending in her boats.
