= Liardet =

Liardet may refer to:

- Claude Liardet, Major General in the British Army
- Frances Liardet, writer and translator of Arabic literature
- Francis Liardet, Captain in the Royal Navy
- Henry Maughan Liardet, Major General in the British Army, son of Claude Liardet
- Tim Liardet, English poet and critic
- Wilbraham Liardet, Australian hotelier, water-colour artist and historian
