= Helmsman =

Sailor with steering duties on a ship

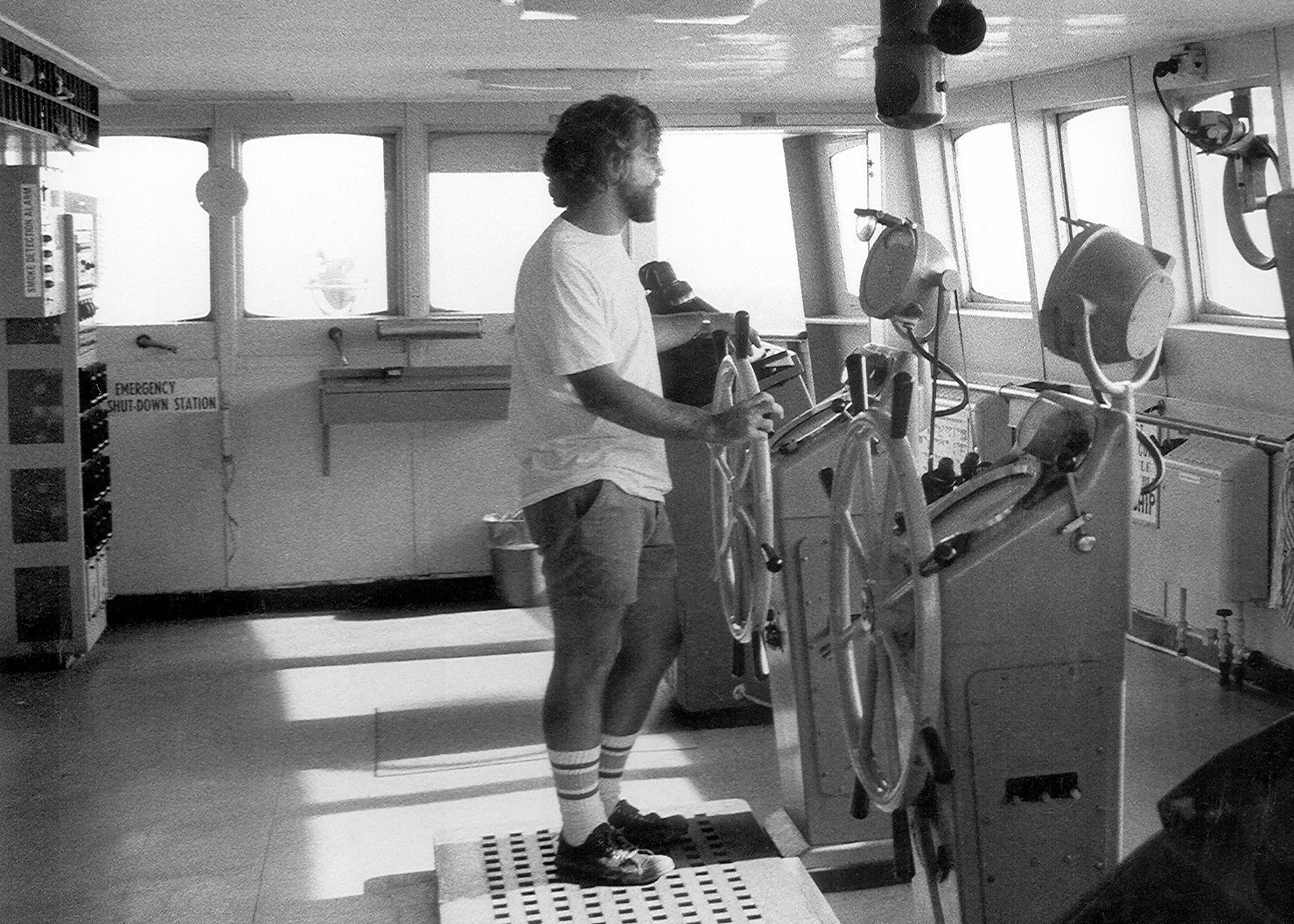
The bridge of the freighter shown here has two steering stands. This redundancy is a safety measure in case one of the steering mechanisms that control the ship's rudder fails.

A helmsman or helm (sometimes driver or steersman) is a person who steers a ship, sailboat, submarine, other type of maritime vessel, airship, or spacecraft. The rank and seniority of the helmsman may vary: on small vessels such as fishing vessels and yachts, the functions of the helmsman are combined with that of the skipper; on larger vessels, there is a separate officer of the watch who is responsible for the safe navigation of the ship and gives orders to the helmsman, who physically steers the ship in accordance with those orders.

In the merchant navy, the person at the helm is usually an able seaman, particularly during ship arrivals, departures, and while maneuvering in restricted waters or other conditions requiring precise steering. An ordinary seaman is commonly restricted to steering in open waters. Moreover, military ships may have a seaman or quartermaster at the helm.

A professional helmsman maintains a steady course, properly executes all rudder orders, and communicates to the officer on the bridge using navigational terms relating to ship's heading and steering. A helmsman relies upon visual references, a magnetic and gyrocompass, and a rudder angle indicator to steer a steady course. The mate or other officer on the bridge directs the helmsman aboard merchant or navy ships.

Clear and exact communication between the helmsman and officer on the bridge is essential to safe navigation and ship handling. Consequently, a set of standard steering commands, responses by the helmsman, and acknowledgment by the conning officer are widely recognized in the maritime industry. The helmsman repeats any verbal commands to demonstrate that the command is heard and understood. The International Convention on Standards of Training, Certification and Watchkeeping for Seafarers (STCW) requires that a helmsman be able to understand and respond to helm orders in English.

The proliferation of autopilot systems and the increased computerization of operations on a ship's bridge lessen the need for helmsmen standing watch in open waters.

== Helm commands ==
Helm orders or commands fall into two categories: rudder commands and heading commands. A rudder command dictates changing the angle of the rudder, which is a single-event action, whereas steering a heading is a comparatively long event and will require ongoing or continuous rudder adjustments.

The following are helm orders used in the United States Navy and United States Coast Guard:

Rudder

- Midships (Bring rudder angle to 0 degrees)
- Meet Her (Counter steer to stop the movement or swing of the ship's bow)
- Hard rudder (Used rarely, such as emergencies, when maximum rudder is required)
- Left or right standard rudder (~20 degrees. Varies per ship)
- Shift your rudder (Steer the same number of degrees but opposite rudder angle)

Heading

- Steady as she goes (Steer as needed to continue current heading)
- Steady on a course (Steer as needed to bring ship on desired course)

== Acquired skills ==
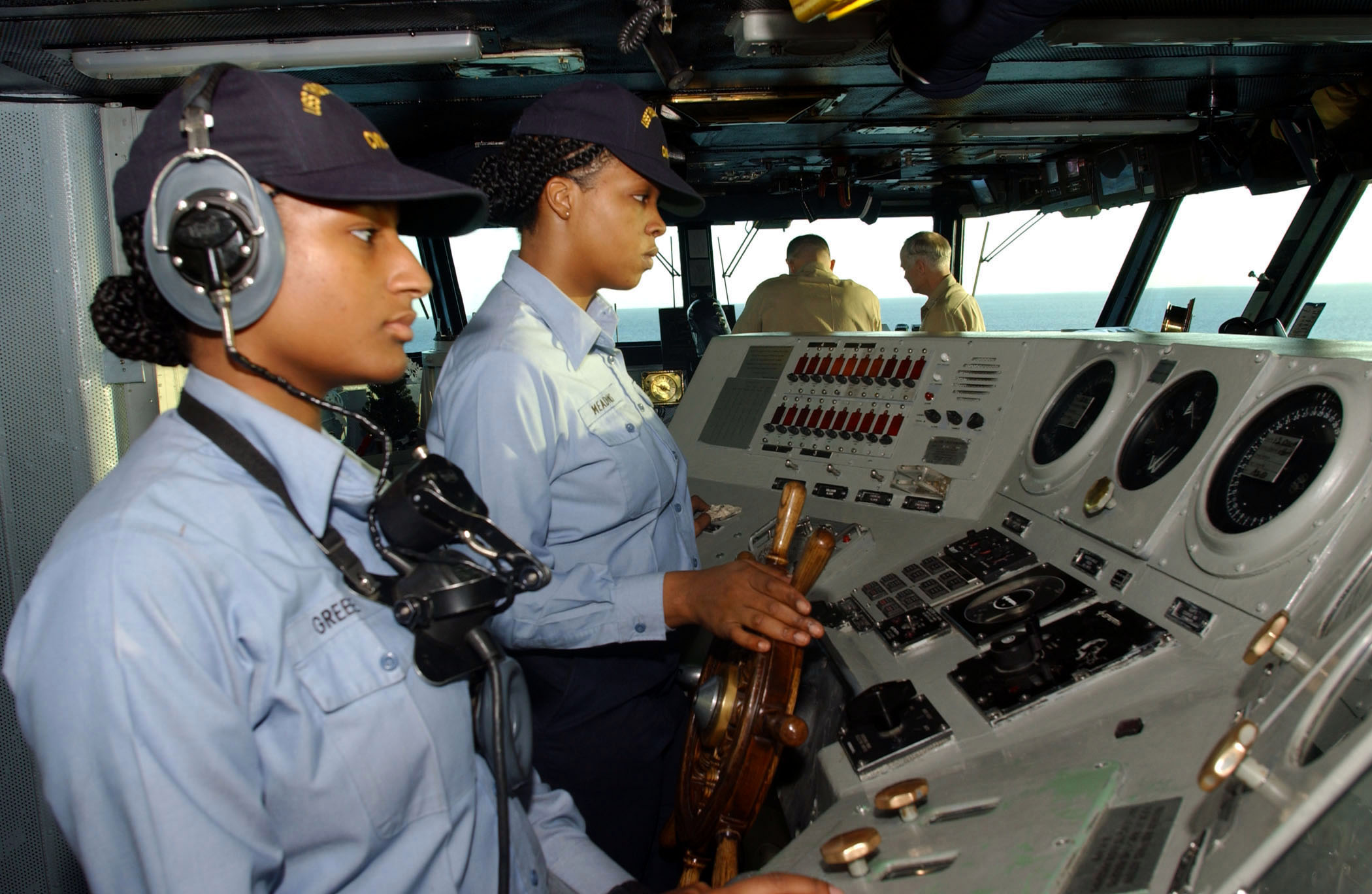
Navy sailors at the helm of an aircraft carrier in December 2001.

Steering a ship effectively requires skills gained through training and experience. An expert helmsman has a keen sense of how a particular ship will respond to the helm or how different sea conditions impact steering. For instance, experience teaches a helmsman the ability to correct the rudder in advance of a ship substantially falling off course. This requires the capacity to anticipate the delay between when the helm is applied and when the ship responds to the rudder. Similarly, a skilled helmsman will avoid overcompensating for a ship's movement caused by local conditions, such as wind, swells, currents, or rough seas.

=== Ship simulators ===
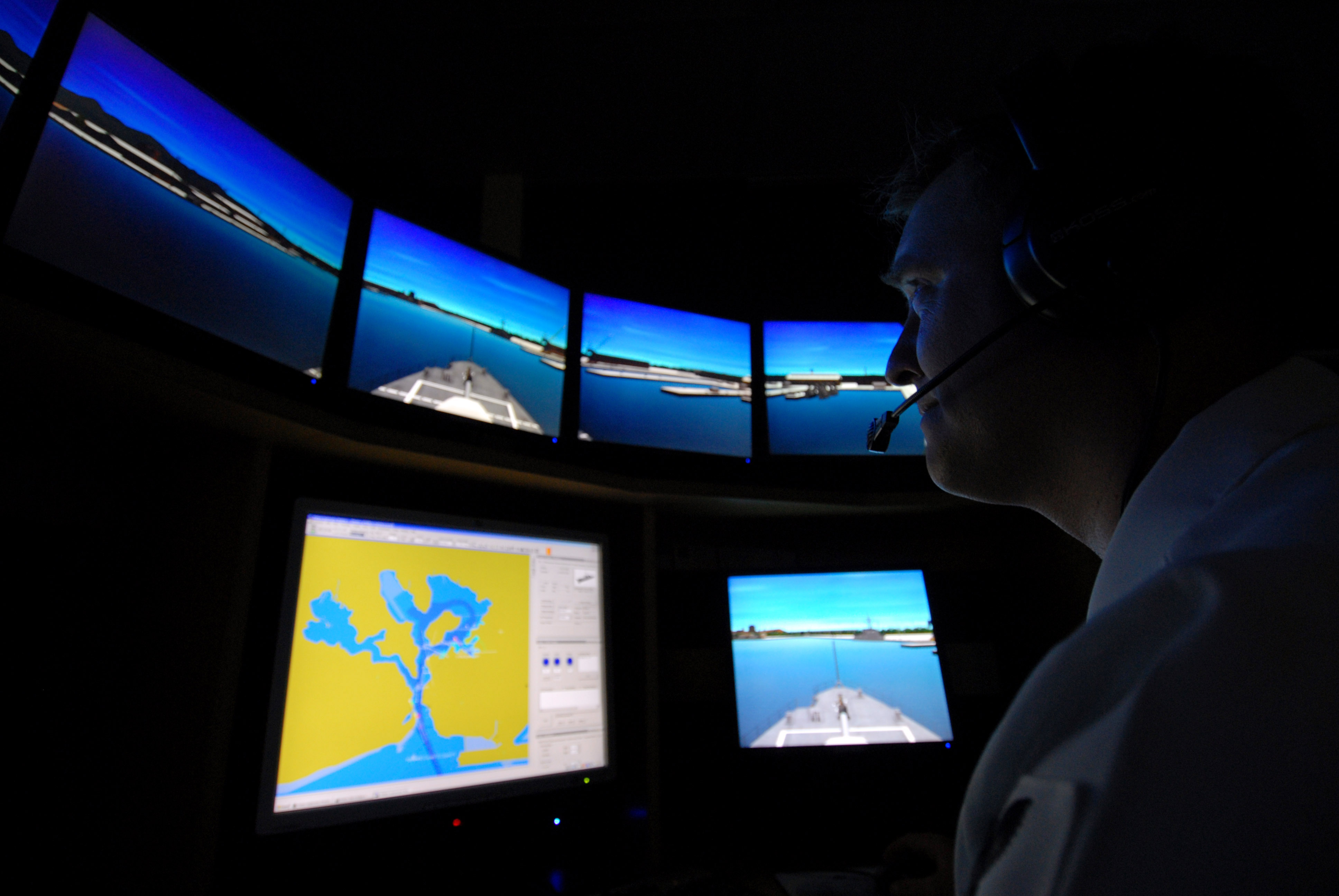
A ship bridge simulator with 3-D graphics creates scenarios with realistic sights and sounds to train mariners in ship handling.

Computer-based ship simulators provide a training environment for learning skills to steer a ship. Training can be programmed to replicate a variety of ship sizes and environmental conditions. Scenarios depicted in 3-D graphics range from making course corrections in open waters to maneuvering in port, rivers, or other shallow waters. Cost compared to a real vessel is low. Mariners learn responses to dangerous situations, such as steering failure, in the safety of a virtual environment.

Land-based ship simulators may feature a full-scale replica of a steering stand with a ship's wheel. Such simulators incorporate magnetic and gyro compasses (or repeaters) for steering. Moreover, a rudder angle indicator that responds appropriately to the helm is part of the configuration.

However technology also allows for a multitude of smaller workstations in a classroom setting. Administrators network student workstations so that the instructor can launch individual scenarios at each station. Computer models are used to accurately simulate conditions such as wind, seas, and currents. Moreover, shallow-water effects or other hydrodynamic forces, such as ships passing close to each other, can also be depicted. A computer application records training sessions, complete with voice commands issued by the instructor which are received by the students via a headset.

=== On the job training ===
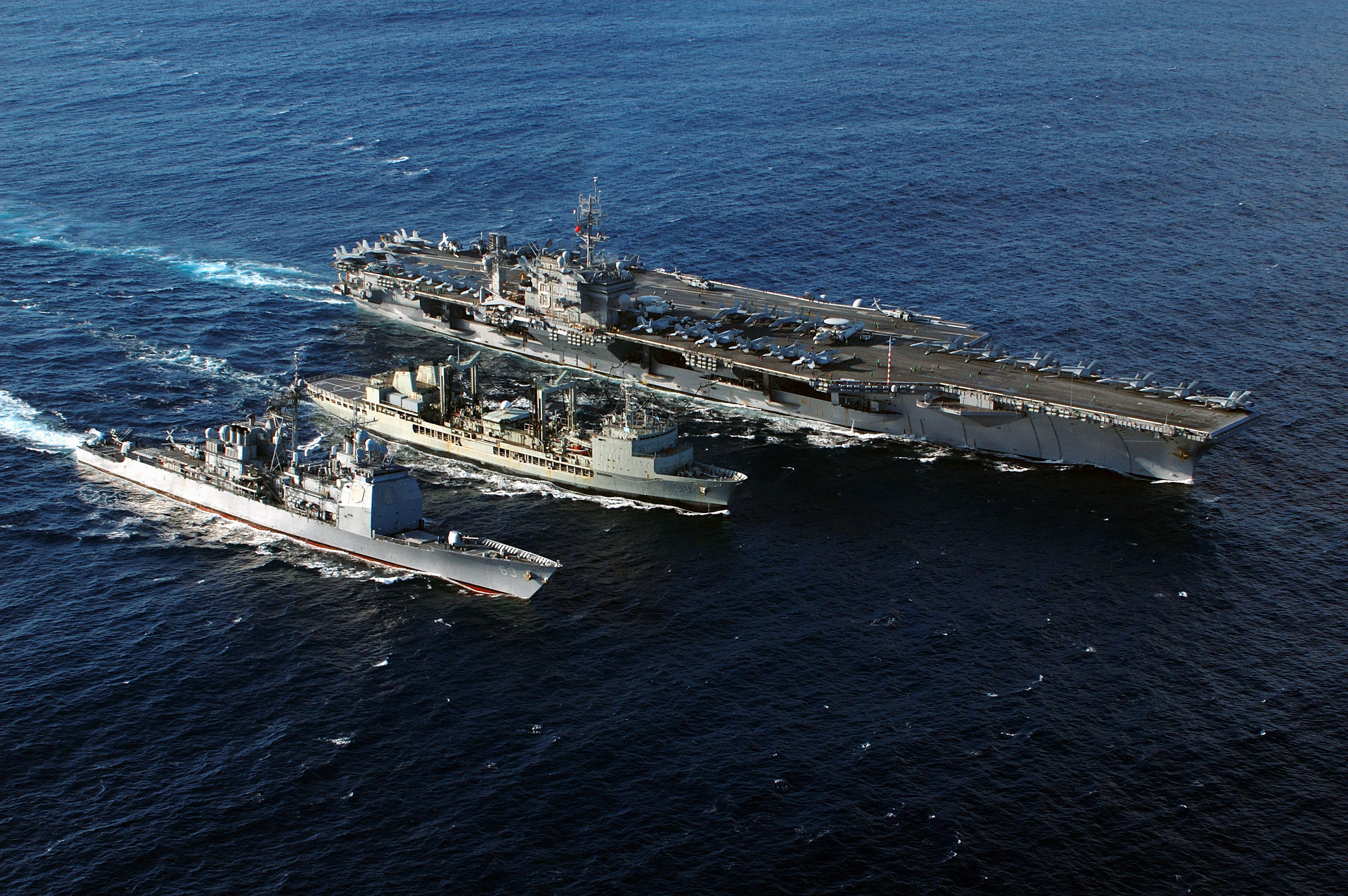
Underway replenishment during which an oil tanker refuels ships at sea demands that the helmsman steer an extremely precise course.

On-the-job training at sea is critical to a helmsman developing ability to "sense" or anticipate how a ship will respond in different conditions. The experienced helmsman uses measured responses to sea conditions, even when encountering heavy weather that may cause a ship to pitch and roll as it pounds its way through oncoming waves. Subsequently, the helmsman learns to relax and take into account the vessel's natural rhythm in order to avoid oversteering whatever the maritime environment. Consequently, more accurate steering is attained with less rudder. Applying the minimal rudder required to steer a course reduces drag of the ship, thereby favorably impacting the ship's speed and operating costs.

One of the helmsman's most important duties is steering a ship in a harbor or seaport when reduced speeds slow a ship's response to the rudder. For it is during ship arrivals and departures, when most ship collisions or groundings occur. Clear communication, then, between the officer of the bridge and the helmsman is essential for safe operations. The officer or harbor pilot relies upon the helmsman to flawlessly execute steering commands to avoid a variety of hazards, including man-made obstacles, land formations, grounding in shallow waters, and the threat of collision with other vessels. In addition, powerful sea tides and river currents encountered in seaports heighten navigation dangers, as a ship's ability to stop is severely limited.

== Relieving the helm ==
Helmsmen of merchant and military ships that are underway stand watch at the helm for a set period of time before being relieved by another watchstander. The person being relieved will complete any course change or other critical maneuver that is in progress before handing over the helm.

=== Merchant vessels ===
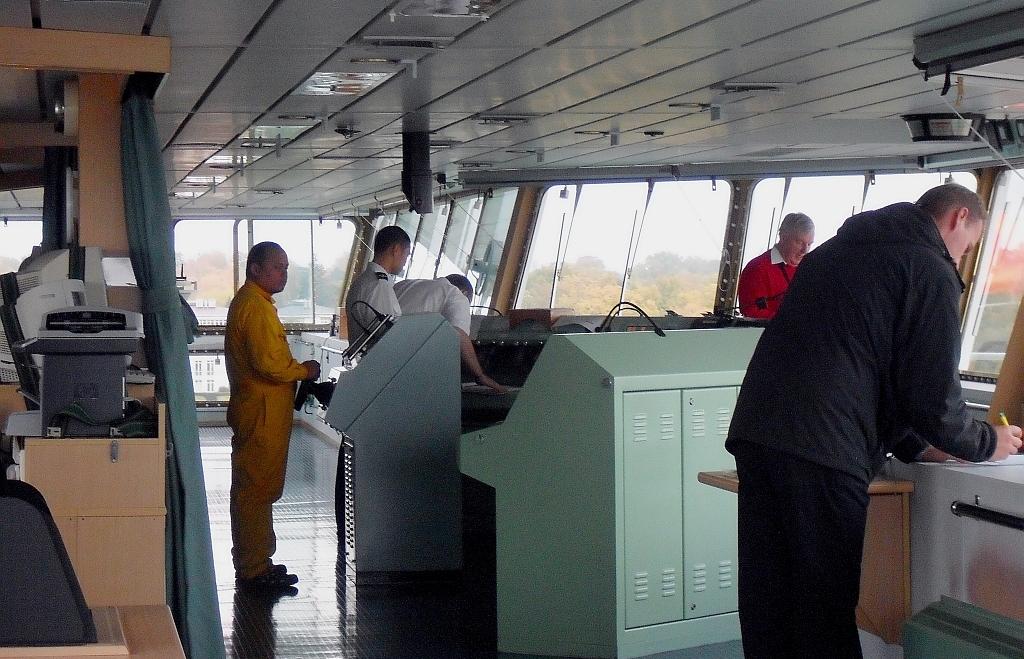
Helmsman on the bridge of a container ship on river trip. The helmsman steers to instruction of the pilot, under the captain's control.

The helmsman handing over the helm will inform the relief helmsman of any rudder commands in place and pertinent conditions. "Steering 180. We have oncoming traffic two points on the starboard" for example. In addition, the current helmsman should inform the relief if there are any peculiarities affecting steerage. Similarly, the helmsman will also point out if he or she is steering on a landmark, range, or navigational light. The relief helmsman is obligated to repeat the course being steered or other rudder command in order to demonstrate an understanding of the situation at the helm.

On merchant ships, it is taught at the various maritime academies that the proper way to relieve the helm is for the helmsman being relieved to call out loudly the ship's course per gyro, course per standard magnetic compass, steering mode, rudder angle, and the pump the vessel is steering off of. The relief helmsman will then take the helm and repeat all the information to ensure that he/she knows what to steer while on watch. An example of this would be:

Helmsman: "Helm is being relieved... steering two-four-eight per gyro, checking two-four-five per standard. Helm is in hand, rudder amidships, steering off the port pump."

Relief: "Helm has been relieved... steering two-four-eight per gyro, checking two-four-five per standard. Helm is in hand, rudder amidships, steering off the port pump."

The officer on watch will usually reply with "very well."

== See also ==
- First mate
- Coxswain
- Seafarer's professions and ranks
- Tiller orders, e.g. "Starboard helm" was used to turn to left
- Showrunner, head producer of a television series, who by analogy to helmsman is also referred to as the helmer and the person helming the series
