= John Walter Roberts =

Royal Navy officer

Captain John Walter Roberts
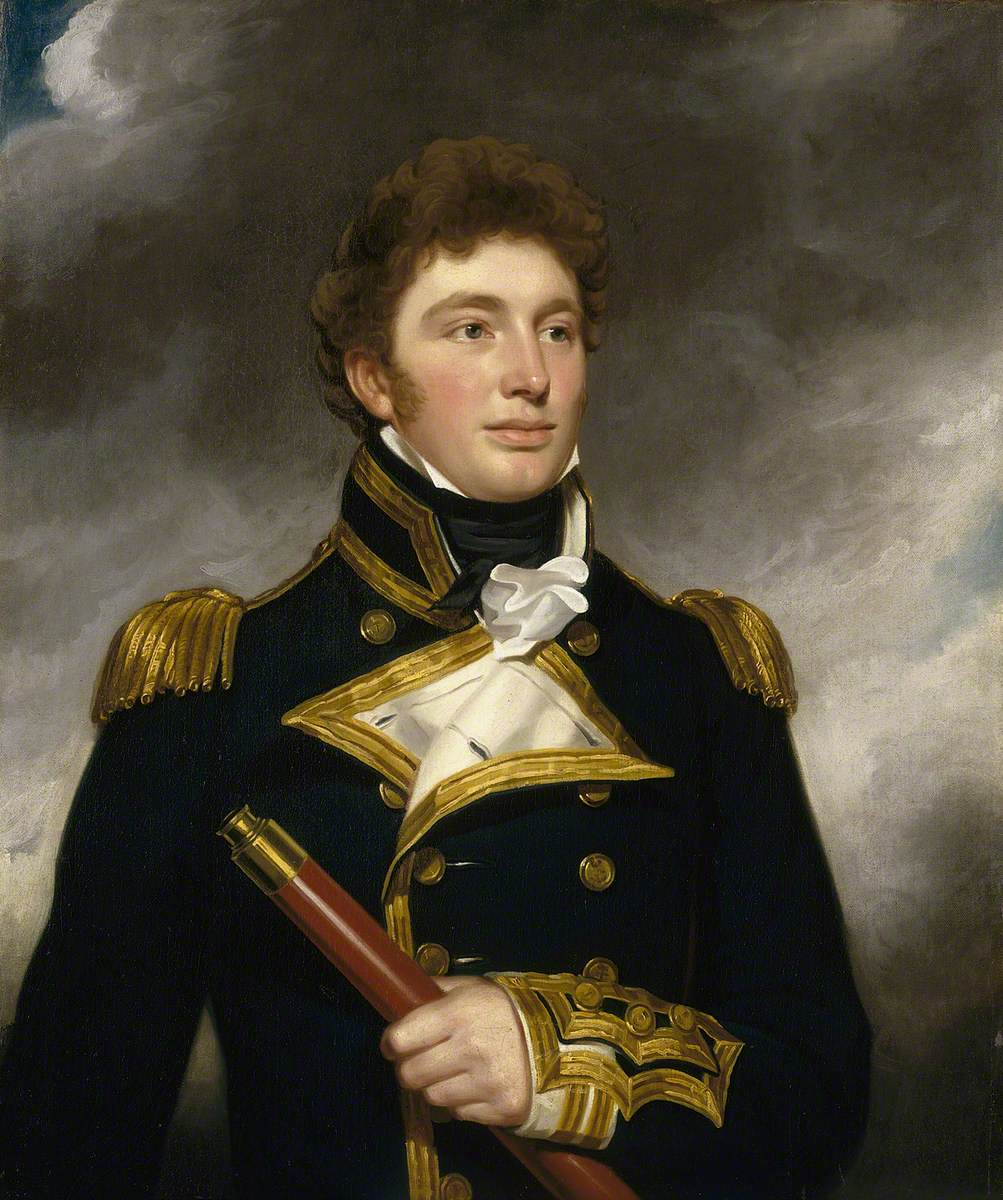
- Portrait by Samuel Lane, c.1823–25
- Born: 1792
- Died: 2 October 1845 (aged 52–53); Petersham, London
- Spouse: Frances Sargent
- Relatives: William Hayward Roberts (grandfather); Sir John Gore (uncle); John Sargent (father-in-law)
- Military career
- Allegiance: United Kingdom
- Branch: Royal Navy
- Service years: 1804–1845
- Rank: Captain
- Commands: HMS Shearwater; HMS Thracian; HMS Tyne
- Conflicts: Napoleonic Wars; Action of 25 September 1806

Captain John Walter Roberts (1792 – 2 October 1845) was a Royal Navy officer who served during the Napoleonic Wars and in the subsequent peace. Supported by his uncle, the Royal Navy officer Sir John Gore, Roberts served as a junior officer on ships in the English Channel and Mediterranean Sea before being promoted to commander in 1814. He received his first command, HMS Shearwater, in 1820, serving at St Helena as well as off the coast of Africa where he made an aborted attempt to find the missionary Heinrich Schmelen in 1821.

Roberts took command of HMS Thracian in 1822, serving on the West Indies Station. Sent to hunt for pirates off Cuba, on 31 March 1823 boats from Thracian and HMS Tyne captured the pirate ship Zaragozana. Roberts was subsequently given command of Tyne and rewarded for his part in the capture with promotion to captain later in the year. He received no further commands in the Royal Navy after decommissioning Tyne, and died, still a captain, in 1845.

== Early life ==
John Walter Roberts was born in 1792. He was the son of the Reverend William Roberts, vice-provost of Eton College and rector of Worplesdon, and the grandson of William Hayward Roberts, provost of Eton. Roberts had a sister who would go on to marry George Wyndham, 4th Earl of Egremont. His maternal uncle was John Gore, a Royal Navy officer.

== Military career ==
=== Junior officer ===
With the Napoleonic Wars ongoing, in December 1804 Roberts followed his uncle into the Royal Navy, becoming a first-class volunteer on board Gore's ship, the 32-gun frigate HMS Medusa. One of his first duties in Medusa was to convey Charles Cornwallis, 1st Marquess Cornwallis to India to take up his post as Governor-General of India, sailing on 15 April. The return journey was one of the fastest to date, taking eighty-two days. In Medusa he also served off the Cape Verde Islands, Saint Helena, and Cádiz. In January 1806 Roberts, now a midshipman, joined his uncle's new command, the 74-gun ship of the line HMS Revenge.

Revenge served as one of the blockading ships off the coast of France, operating off Brest, L'Orient, and then Rochefort. On the latter blockade Roberts witnessed the capture of four French frigates by other ships of the squadron at the Action of 25 September 1806. The ship moved to the Cádiz blockade in early 1807, before returning to England in June the following year. Roberts left the ship in about August, Gore having relinquished command to get married, and Roberts transferred to the 40-gun frigate HMS Endymion. He spent the following two years serving off the western coast of Spain.

Roberts returned to serving under Gore in August 1810 joining his new ship, the 80-gun ship of the line HMS Tonnant. He continued in Tonnant, in the English Channel and off Lisbon, until July 1811 when he was promoted to become an acting lieutenant. He took up this role in the 38-gun frigate HMS Amazon, patrolling the Bay of Biscay under the command of Captain William Parker. Roberts received substantive promotion on 6 March the following year, and was sent to join the Mediterranean Fleet as a lieutenant in the 74-gun ship of the line HMS Armada.

For the next two years Roberts cycled through several ships of the Mediterranean Fleet, serving in the 74-gun ship of the line HMS Repulse off Toulon from 9 May 1812, the 38-gun frigate HMS Imperieuse off the coast of Italy from 30 January 1813, and then the 120-gun ship of the line HMS Caledonia from 4 January 1814. The latter ship was the flagship of Vice-Admiral Sir Edward Pellew. In the meantime Roberts' uncle Gore had been promoted to rear-admiral, and was also in the Mediterranean with his flag in Revenge. Roberts joined Gore on 24 March as his flag lieutenant, serving in a detached squadron in the Adriatic Sea.

=== Command ===
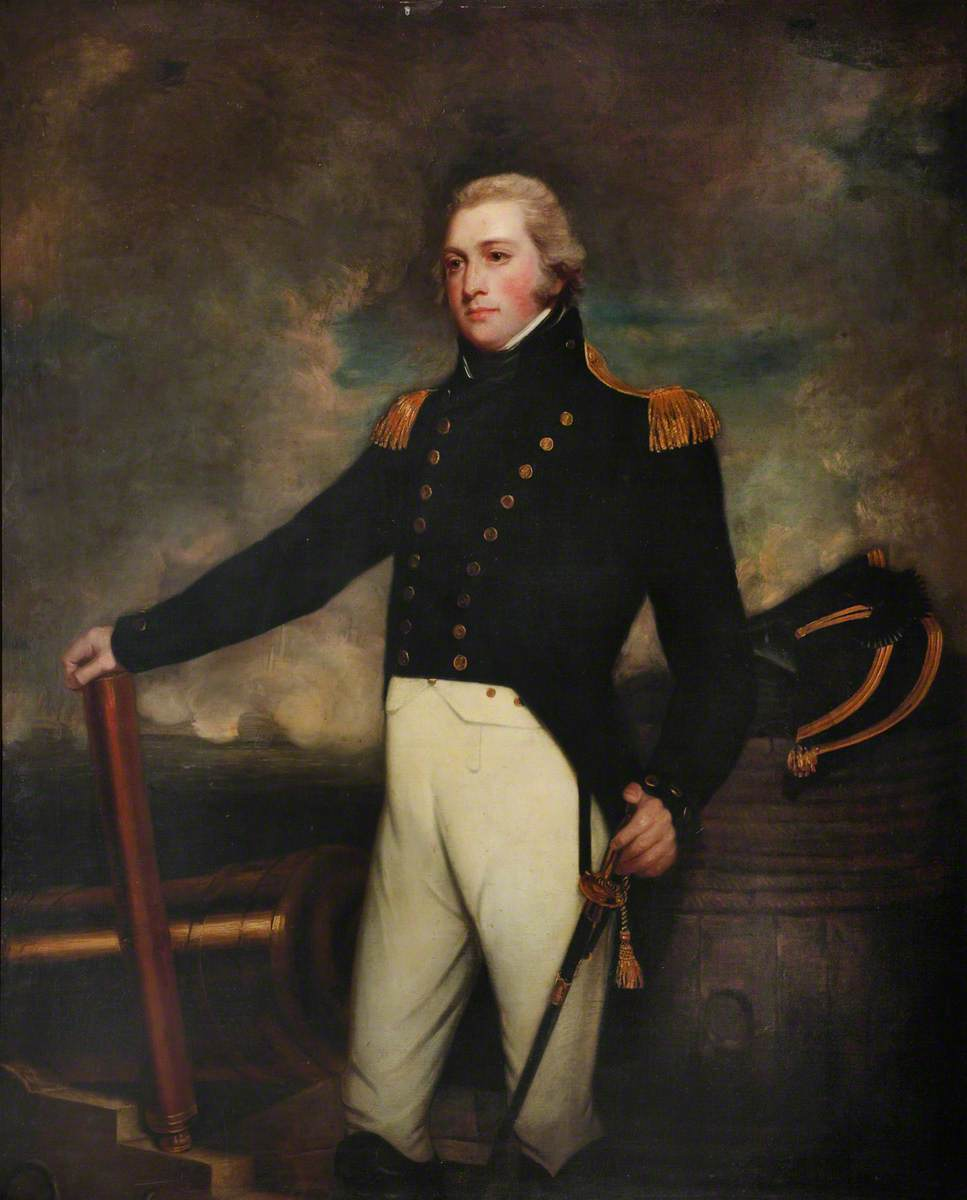
Sir John Gore, Roberts' uncle, was a key feature of his early career

==== St Helena and Africa ====
Roberts was promoted to commander on 26 August. He was not immediately employed in this new rank, and saw no further service during the Napoleonic Wars. Roberts received his first command on 18 April 1820 when he joined the 10-gun brig-sloop HMS Shearwater. Through his period in command of the ship, Shearwater served on the St Helena Station, also making visits to the Cape of Good Hope and Mauritius, during which period the ship was at one point caught in a storm, forcing Roberts to throw all of Shearwater's guns overboard in order to stay afloat. Shearwater arrived at Table Bay, the Cape, on 22 January 1821, from where Roberts was given orders to survey Olifants River, make contact with the Nama people to establish trade, and to search for the missing missionary Heinrich Schmelen. The ship arrived off Olifants River on 5 February.

Shearwater was caught in a sudden squall off the mouth of the river in the night of 6 February and almost capsized before the crew got control of the ship, losing the maintopgallant mast in the process. Roberts then sent a party of seamen ashore with guides who spoke the local languages, but they quickly ran out of water and had to return on 12 February. Roberts chose to next send out three separate groups in different directions in order to maximise the chance of meeting locals who could guide them to the missing missionary or initiate trade talks. They departed on February 13. Struggling in the desert heat and with poor water supplies, the parties returned emptyhanded on 15, 17, and 18 February respectively.

A small group of natives arrived at the beach off which Shearwater was stationed on 19 February and were brought aboard. They knew of a white man living in one of their villages, who Roberts assumed to be Schmelen. He decided to this time go himself to search for the man. Roberts departed on 20 February with some seamen and the locals as guides. Upon reached the shore the guides changed their minds and refused to take Roberts further. He thus continued with his party of seamen, following wagon tracks. Having walked inland about 50 miles (80 km) by 23 February, Roberts could find no settlement or sign of life, and chose to return to Shearwater, arriving back on the following day. One of Roberts' lieutenants later calculated that they had been searching in the wrong direction for Schmelen, who had been living in Bethanie.

The St Helena Station had been created by the Royal Navy as part of the guard to Napoleon who was incarcerated there. He died on the island on 5 May, leaving the squadron without a purpose. It was subsequently recalled to England. Roberts sailed Shearwater to Portsmouth in January 1822, where the ship was paid off. He did not stay without a command for long, being appointed to the 18-gun ship-sloop HMS Thracian on 14 June the same year.

==== West Indies pirate hunting ====
Thracian subsequently joined the West Indies Station. Early in 1823 Thracian was sent, alongside the 26-gun post ship HMS Tyne under the command of Captain John Edward Walcott, on patrol to hunt for pirates in the Old Bahama Channel and off Cuba. After two months of unsuccessful searching in creeks and inlets, on 29 March they received news that the pirate schooner Zaragozana was sailing off Baracoa. The two British ships reached that location on 31 March, locating Zaragozana there. Roberts and Walcott disguised their ships as merchant vessels and followed the pirate for three hours as she made her way towards the pirate harbour of Mata. They removed their disguises and chased Zaragozana before she anchored there at 1:30pm. It was decided that the pirate would have to be attacked by boats of Thracian and Tyne, as she had taken up a formidable defensive position in a shallow part of the harbour, while flying the Spanish flag.

Roberts sent Thracian's boats into the attack at 3pm under the command of Lieutenant Amos Plymsell; the combined force reached Zaragozana around forty-five minutes later, during which time the pirates fired on the boats from Zaragozana and the shore, initially still wearing the Spanish flag before replacing it with the black flag. The boats succeeded in boarding Zaragozana, after which most of the pirate crew jumped overboard to escape. Twenty-eight of them including the commander, Cayatano Aroganez, were captured. As senior officer Walcott reported the success to his commanding officer, Rear-Admiral Sir Charles Rowley. He emphasised Roberts' part in the operation, saying:

"I should equally be wanting in candour towards those who were unavoidably left in the ships, were I not to state, that all panted to accompany me, foremost amongst whom, in justice to him and in honor to myself, must I name Captain Roberts, who on every occasion throughout the period of his service with me, has manifested a zeal and effort commanding the applause of all. He lost no time in following me with the ships, and had reached, by the assistance of Mr. Bull, acting master of the Tyne...nearly within gun-shot, on our capture being complete."

Walcott and Roberts received congratulations from Rowley and the Admiralty for their feat, while the captured pirates were executed at Jamaica. In April Walcott was taken ill and forced to return to England, and Rowley chose Roberts to replace him in command of Tyne. As part of a series of promotions for the sailors involved in the capture of Zaragozana, Roberts was then advanced to captain on 16 June. He commanded Tyne off the coasts of Cuba and Mexico, during which time the crew suffered heavily from yellow fever. Roberts continued on the West Indies Station until the end of the year, when he sailed Tyne back to England, transporting with him $500,000 and a quantity of cochineal on behalf of local merchants. The ship arrived on 15 December. Tyne was de-commissioned in January 1824, and Roberts received no further employment within the Royal Navy. He died at Petersham on 2 October 1845.

== Personal life ==
Roberts married Frances Sargent, the daughter of retired member of parliament John Sargent, on 15 November 1825. The Roberts and Sargent families were familiar with each other. Roberts' grandfather had tutored John Sargent, Frances' brother, at Eton. The couple went on to have children together. Frances survived Roberts, dying in Chelsea in 1873.
