= HMS Tay (1813) =

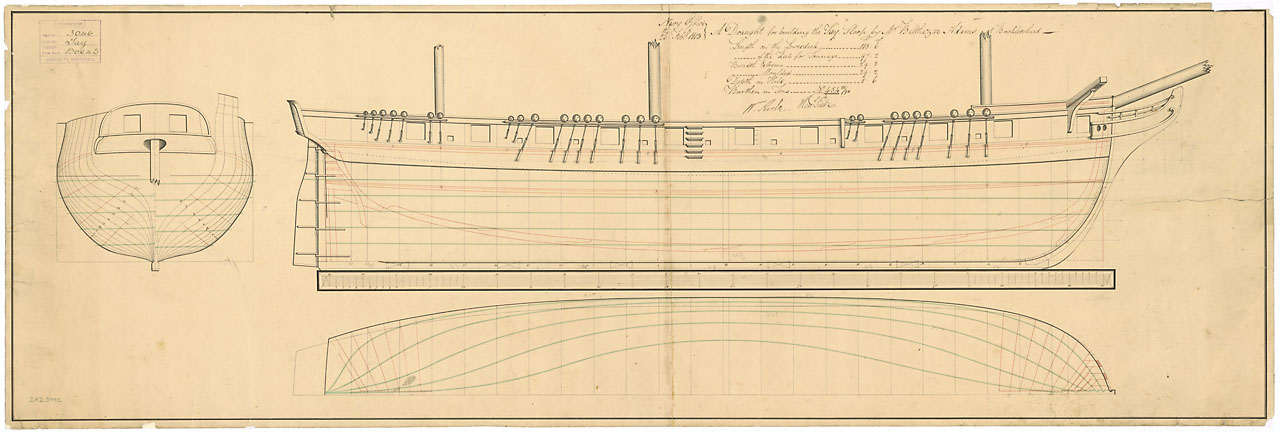
- Drawing of the Tay, 1813

History

United Kingdom
- Name: HMS Tay
- Namesake: River Tay
- Ordered: 18 November 1812
- Builder: Balthazar Adams, Bucklers Hard, Hampshire
- Laid down: April 1813
- Launched: November 1813
- Fate: Wrecked 1816

General characteristics
- Class & type: Cyrus-class post ship
- Tons burthen: 455 12/94 (bm)
- Length: 115 ft 8 1/2 in (35.3 m) (gundeck); 97 ft 2 5/8 in (29.6 m) (keel)
- Beam: 29 ft 10 in (9.1 m)
- Depth of hold: 8 ft 6 1/8 in (2.6 m)
- Sail plan: Full-rigged ship
- Complement: 135
- Armament: 20 × 32-pounder carronades; 2 × 6-pounder chase guns

HMS Tay was launched on 28 November 1813 at Bucklers Hard as a 20-gun sixth-rate post ship. She had a brief career, notable only for the circumstances surrounding her wrecking on 11 November 1816 in the Gulf of Mexico off the Yucatán coast.

== Career ==
On her launch Tay went into Ordinary at Portsmouth. Then in October to November 1814 she underwent fitting for sea. Captain William Robilliard commissioned her in August 1814. In January–February 1815 Tay underwent modification at Portsmouth. Captain Robert Boyle assumed command in February.

On 26 June, Panther, Gezoline, master, arrived at Plymouth as a prize to Conway, Musquito, Acteon, Tay, and Prometheus. Panther had been sailing from Martinique to Dunkirk when the British captured her.

Commander Samuel Roberts was promoted to post captain on 13 June 1815 and replaced Boyle in command of Tay on 24 January 1816. (Note: The National Maritime Museum's database shows D. Dunn as captain of Tay for 1816, but no other records support this.) Roberts then sailed Tay to the Jamaica Station.

== Loss ==
Tay was sailing from Havana to Campeche, Mexico, when at 1 a.m. 11 November lookouts spotted breakers ahead, even though a sounding a few minutes earlier had found no ground at 20 fathoms. Although the helmsman was able to turn her, Tay slammed broadside into a coral reef; she slammed twice more before heeling over and filling with water. The crew fired distress guns, cut away her masts, launched boats, and manned the pumps. Daylight showed a rocky reef nearby. However, in trying to reach it the boats swamped, causing one passenger, a Spaniard, to drown. Eventually the crew were able to use a raft to reach the rocks while hauling a hawser that the rest of the crew then used to escape the wreck. The next day the crew used the boats to salvage provisions and stores from the wreck and establish a camp on a nearby island. Lieutenant Henry Smithwick then sailed Tay's yawl to the mainland in search of help.

On 18 November the Spanish guarda costa Valencey, Captain Varines, arrived, together with the schooner Zaragozana. After the Spaniards had verified that all the crew were safely on the island, they proceeded to demand, at gunpoint, that Captain Roberts and his crew surrender and deliver over their arms and any specie on board Tay. Roberts surrendered, declaring he and his men "prisoners of war", a status the Spaniards acknowledged. They then proceeded to loot Tay of her stores and provisions. The Spaniards also recovered about $350,000 in specie. (An early report of her loss stated that Tay had $2 million in specie on board.) Zaragozana then took off Tay's complement.

Tay had struck on the east side of Scorpion Reef (Spanish: Arrecife Alacranes; 22°26′N 89°40′W), which surrounds a small group of islands. The reef and islands sit in the Gulf of Mexico off the northern coast of the state of Yucatán, Mexico, and are part of the Campeche Bank archipelago. (Note: There is a report that Roberts and his men camped on "Crane's Island". Unfortunately, it has so far proved impossible to link the 19th Century British name to any extant Spanish name.)

== Court martial ==
The Navy held a court martial for Roberts and his crew on Salisbury at Port Royal, Jamaica, on 21 February 1817. The trial lasted 18 days, not including Sundays, and covered three issues: the loss of Tay, the propriety of Roberts's surrender, and the behaviour of some of Tay's crew.

The court martial acquitted Roberts, his officers, and crew of any blame for the loss of Tay. It attributed the loss to a strong westerly current and stated that Roberts had taken every possible precaution. Furthermore, the board commended the officer of the watch, acting Lieutenant William Henry Gearey, for his prompt and officer-like conduct when the breakers were first discovered.

With respect to the surrender, the court martial again exonerated Roberts and his crew, saying:

that in consequence of the peculiar situation of the ship, her guns being entirely useless, her magazine drowned, the greater part of her crew on shore unarmed, on the island, eleven miles from the wreck, and the treacherous conduct of the Spaniards, in inveigling on board and taking possession of the boats and their crews, all and every means of defence was rendered impracticable; that in this distressed and helpless situation the conduct of the Spaniards became so decidedly hostile and insulting, that no other alternative was left for preserving the dignity of his Majesty's flag, but that of striking it, which was accordingly done, with the concurrence of every officer present; and the Court doth fully approve of Captain Roberts's conduct, and doth, therefore, acquit him, the officers, and crew, of all blame; and they are hereby acquitted accordingly."

During the stay on the island there had been a notable breakdown in discipline among the crew. The court martial sentenced 14 sailors and marines to receive from 50 to 200 lashes for offenses ranging from drunkenness to looting of the wreck. Midshipman Hilkitch Head was found guilty of breaking into cabins and rifling them for papers and money. His sentence comprised two parts. First, he was taken to the quarterdeck of a naval vessel, stripped of his coat (and of his marks of rank), and discharged from the Navy. Second, he then was sentenced to six months in solitary confinement in the Marshalsea.

== Aftermath ==
When Roberts departed for Britain, the merchants of Kingston, Jamaica, presented "an Address to him, expressive of the high respect they entertain of his character, their indignation at the dastardly conduct of the officer commanding the Spanish vessel sent to his assistance, their admiration of the judgment Captain R. displayed on that trying occasion, and their deep regret that the station had been deprived of his valuable services."

Roberts left for England on 17 March as captain of the transport Lady Hamilton. After his return to England, Roberts went on to Waterford, where he had been born. There some local notables gave him a testimonial dinner. On 31 January 1823 Roberts commissioned the sloop Egeria. In her he cruised to the West Indies and Havana, returning to England in July 1825.

Reportedly, in October 1818 the Spanish returned the specie that they had looted from Tay.
