= HMS Assiduous =

History
- Name: Jackal
- Launched: Circa 1820
- Captured: 1823

United Kingdom
- Name: HMS Assiduous
- Acquired: 1823 by purchase of a prize
- Fate: Sold 1825

General characteristics
- Tons burthen: 54 (bm)
- Sail plan: Schooner
- Complement: 31
- Armament: 1 × 12-pounder + 1 × 32-pounder carronades

HMS Assiduous was the former pirate vessel Jackal, captured in 1823. On 24 June 1824 Assiduous and HMS Lion captured a pirate schooner. Lieutenant Richard Dowse commissioned Assiduous in November 1824. After HMS Lion, a tender to HMS Carnation, captured the slave ship Relampago, Carnation, Union, and Assiduous set out in pursuit of another slaver. They chased her into Cardinas (or Cardanas). There the Spanish authorities refused to permit the British permission to seize her, despite an inspection revealing that she had carried slaves. The vessel was Magico, and Union finally captured her in 1826.

The navy sold Assiduous on 5 May 1825.

== Post script ==
Vice Admiral Lawrence Halsted, Commander-in-Chief, West Indies, ordered HMS Magpie and Monkey built on the lines of Assiduous.
