= HMS Monkey (1826) =

British anti-slavery patrol ship

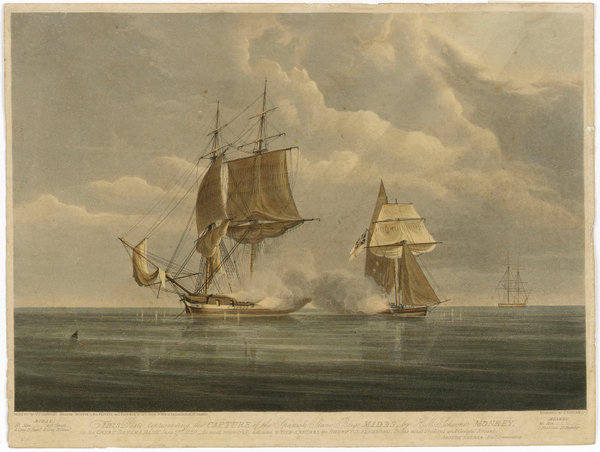
- HMS Monkey captures the Spanish slaver Midas, by William John Huggins, National Maritime Museum

History

United Kingdom
- Name: HMS Monkey
- Builder: McLean, Jamaica
- Acquired: June 1826
- Fate: Wrecked, May 1831

General characteristics
- Type: Schooner
- Tons burthen: 70, or 73, or 75 (bm)
- Length: 53 ft 3 in (16.2 m) (overall); *40 ft 8 1/2 in (12.4 m) (keel)
- Beam: 18 ft (5.5 m)
- Depth of hold: 7 ft 3 in (2.2 m)
- Complement: 26
- Armament: 1 × long 12-pounder gun on a pivot

HMS Monkey was a schooner of the British Royal Navy, launched in 1826 at Jamaica and assigned to the West Indies squadron. She made three notable captures of slaver ships, one involving a single-ship action against a slave ship much larger and more heavily armed than herself. She was wrecked in 1831 near Tampico.

== Origins ==
Vice Admiral Lawrence Halsted, Commander-in-Chief, West Indies, ordered HMS Magpie and Monkey built on the lines of HMS Assiduous. There was a third vessel, Nimble, that the Navy found defective and refused to accept.

== Career ==
Lieutenant Edward Holland commissioned Monkey on 26 July 1826, for Jamaica. In July 1827, Lieutenant James Beckford Lewis Hay replaced Holland. Lieutenant Martin Cole was appointed to replace Hay on 20 September 1828, but in October Lieutenant Joseph Sherer assumed command.

On 8 December, Monkey landed a detachment of the 2nd West India Regiment, under the command of Captain Thomas McPherson, on Exuma. The troops' arrival calmed unrest among slaves on a plantation there.

On 14 March 1829, Monkey, under the command of Lieutenant Joseph Sherer, captured the American vessel Borneo. (Note: A first-class share of the prize money was worth £18 8s; a sixth-class share, that of an ordinary seaman, was worth 19s 6d.)

On 7 April 1829, Monkey captured the Spanish schooner Josefa, in among the Bahamas, near the Berry Islands or Rocks (25°50′30″N 77°45′30″W). Josepha was armed with one 12-pounder gun, had a crew of 21, and was carrying 206 captives; 79 men, 36 women, 48 boys and 43 girls. After Josefa's capture one female child was born, and one woman died. Head money for 206 captives was paid in February 1831. (Note: A first-class share was worth £533 13s 9d a sixth class share, that of an ordinary seaman, was worth £9 19s 11¼d.)

On 27 June 1829, she captured the Spanish slave ship Midas near Bimini at 25°55′N 77°17′W. The 360-ton Midas, alias Providencia, was under the command of Captain Ildefonso Martinez. Midas, which mounted four long 18-pounder and four medium 12-pounder guns and had a crew of more than 50, was taken in an action lasting 35 minutes. One or more of her crew and of the slaves on board were killed and others wounded in the battle.

Nimble helped Monkey escort Midas to port. Midas had left Africa in April 1829, with 562 Africans, but only 369 were still alive when Midas was captured, and 72 more died of "smallpox, diarrhea & scurvy" before Monkey and Nimble could take Midas into Havana. Lieutenant Sherer discovered that Midas's crew included two Americans (one severely wounded by grapeshot in the capture), and five British subjects, including one "a free Black of Jamaica". Scherer turned the Americans over to Grampus. (Note: Three of the British seamen were found to have been saved from a Liverpool vessel wrecked on the African coast. They had been found under arms on Midas and were sentenced to death for piracy. Their sentence was commuted to transportation for life.) Head money for 400 captives was paid in February 1831. (Note: A first-class share was worth £1118 17s 1d; a sixth class share, that of an ordinary seaman, was worth £76 5s 8¼d.)

Sherer received promotion to the rank of Commander on 30 December 1829, for his successes.

In 1830, Monkey was briefly under the command of Lieutenant Willoughby Shortland. She served as a tender to Blossom. Shortland transferred to the command of Skipjack in March 1831.

== Loss ==
Monkey was under the command of Mate Thomas Downes when she wrecked on 13 May 1831, near Tampico, Mexico. A local steam boat was towing her across the bar at Tampico but only succeeded in running her aground. Supposedly she was beaten to a wreck and her remains sold at auction on 25 May. Still, her crew were rescued.

The Royal Navy replaced her in October with a second Monkey.
