= William Hobson =

Royal Navy officer and colonial administrator

Captain William Hobson
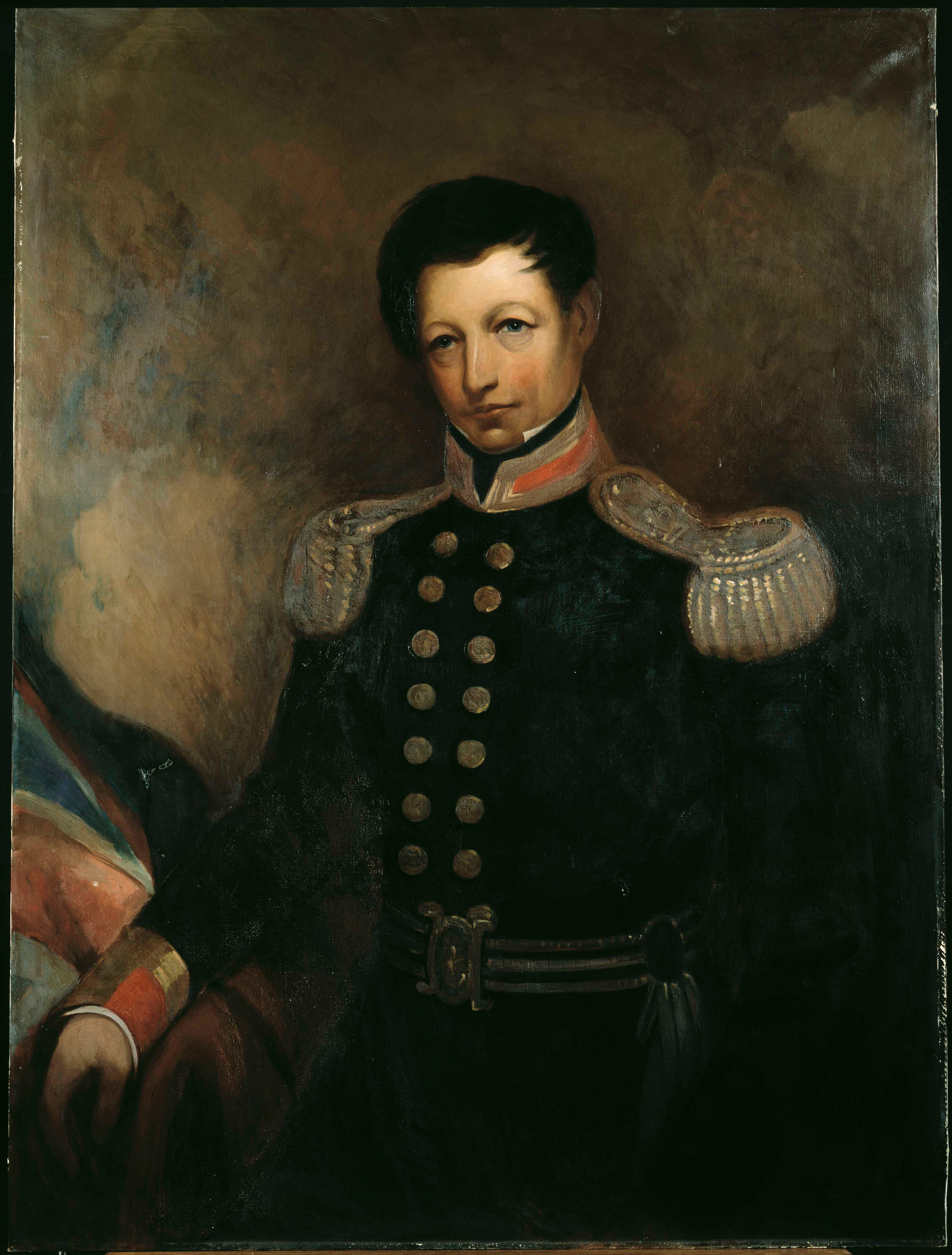
- Captain William Hobson, RN (post captain). Artist: James McDonald, c. 1913, copy after William Collins of Bath, c. 1835.

1st Governor of New Zealand
- In office 3 May 1841 – 10 September 1842
- Monarch: Victoria
- Preceded by: Office established
- Succeeded by: Robert FitzRoy

Lieutenant-Governor of New Zealand
- In office 30 July 1839 – 3 May 1841
- Monarch: Victoria
- Governor: George Gipps (Governor of New South Wales)
- Preceded by: Office established
- Succeeded by: Office abolished

Personal details
- Born: 26 September 1792 Waterford, Kingdom of Ireland
- Died: 10 September 1842 (aged 49) Auckland, Colony of New Zealand
- Resting place: Symonds Street Cemetery
- Spouse: Eliza Ann Elliott (m. 1827)
- Children: 5
- Military career
- Allegiance: United Kingdom
- Branch: Royal Navy
- Service years: 1803–1842
- Rank: Captain
- Served on: HMS Virginie, 1803– HMS Dart, 1805– HMS Temeraire, 1806– HMS Theseus, 1808– HMS Poictiers; HMS Dragon; HMS Peruvian, 1813– HMS Spey, 1818– HMS Tyne, 1821– HMS Lion, 1823– HMS Ferret, 1825– HMS Scylla, 1826– HMS Rattlesnake, 1834–
- Commands: Frederick, 1819; Whim, 1822: HMS Lion; HMS Ferret; HMS Scylla; HMS Rattlesnake
- Campaigns: Napoleonic Wars; Battle of the Basque Roads; War of 1812; Penobscot Expedition; Battle of Hampden; Suppression of Piracy; Abolition of the Slave Trade
- Memorials: Memorial plaque, Waitangi Treaty Grounds; Memorial, St Paul's Church, Auckland

Captain William Hobson (26 September 1792 – 10 September 1842) was a Royal Navy officer and colonial administrator who served as the first governor of New Zealand from 1841 to 1842. He was a co-author of the Treaty of Waitangi which he, as Crown representative, and several Maori chiefs signed on 6 February 1840. On 3 May 1840, he proclaimed British sovereignty over New Zealand. He also selected the site for a new capital, which he named Auckland. In May 1841, New Zealand was constituted as a separate Crown colony with Hobson promoted to governor and commander-in-chief. In his final months, Hobson was dogged by poor health which left him detached from political affairs. He died in office in September 1842.

== Early life and naval career ==
William Hobson was born in Waterford, Kingdom of Ireland, the son of Samuel Hobson, a barrister, and Martha Jones. He grew up in an Anglo-Irish Anglican family and attended a private school.

He enrolled in the Royal Navy as a Volunteer 2nd Class, at Deptford, on 25 August 1803, assigned to HMS Virginie under the command of Captain Sir John Beresford, served in the Napoleonic Wars and the War of 1812, and was later involved in the suppression of piracy in the Caribbean. He advanced to midshipman in 1806 and seven years later was commissioned first lieutenant on 11 November 1813.

=== Mediterranean Sea ===
On 3 October 1818, the chartered brig Frederick, under the command of Lieutenant William Hobson of HMS Spey, brought the brig William of Liverpool, into Malta along with its master, Christopher Delano, and crew (less the steward who had escaped) in chains. William had been arrested at Smyrna under the allegation of having committed piracy upon the Helen, Captain Cornish, as well as plundering an American and a Portuguese vessel; Spanish doubloons having been found on it. It was expected that Delano and his men would be tried at Malta on 26 October for piracy and possibly the murder of William's missing mate, Robinson.

=== West Indies ===
In September 1822, Nassau merchants provided Admiral Sir Charles Rowley with two sloops to be crewed from HMS Tyne, to cruise against pirates—the Eliza, 40 tons bm armed with one 12-pounder carronade, commanded by Lieutenant Hugh Nurse, with George White, midshipman, and 23–24 men, and Whim, 43 tons bm, commanded by Lieutenant Hobson, with Holloway and Phillips, midshipmen, and 20 men.

Whilst anchored at Cayo Guajaba, in the province of Camagüey, Cuba, on 29 September 1822, Whim was captured by pirate leader Pepe Diablito. The pirates maltreated and starved their Royal Navy captives for several or eight days, by accounts, including placing rope around of Hobson's neck and those of his men with apparent intent to hang them. A cook suffered the worst:

A cry was raised to sacrifice the black cook, a native of Jamaica (and consequently if not an Englishman, one under the protection of the English flag), whom they had removed from a vessel they had captured. In vain did the poor fellow implore their mercy. They dragged him from his occupation, and instantly spritsail-yarded him, having secured him in a position to offer the fairest mark; these infamous villains amused themselves for 20 minutes, slightly wounding him at every shot before their savage pastime was surfeited, and the coup de grace inflicted.

Contrary to their unscrupulous reputation, the pirates returned Hobson and his crew to their sloop, though, without provisions, rudder, boom and anchor, and set them adrift at sea. Several days later and very thirsty, they were located and rescued by Nurse and crew of Eliza off Cayo Romano.

Continuing on to suppress the pirate swarm interrupting trade in Caribbean waters, Rowley assigned two schooners to hunt them. Volunteering, Lieutenant Hobson was given command of HMS Lion, formerly La Gata captured by HMS Grecian on 20 March 1823, and Lieutenant Thomas Marriott command of the schooner HMS Union, at Jamaica, on 30 January 1823.

Whilst watering in the Colorados Archipelago on 28 March 1823, HM Schooners Lion, Union and boats of HMS Tamar caught sight of a large schooner, of about 80 tons (bm), and immediately took chase. On nearing, the pirates set their schooner alight and ran it aground. Some 160 pirates escaped to the beach. The schooner was found to have three heavy guns and a cargo recently plundered from a French ship. After rescuing the cargo, pirate schooner 104, as marked on mast and sail, was destroyed.

The next day, 29 March, a pirate sloop was seen close to shore in Baja Bay. Lion and Union immediately manned their boats, and together with two launches from HMS Tamar or HMS HMS Hyperion, went after it. On approaching the sloop, the Royal Navy was drawn into a heavy four-and-a-half-hour firefight. The pirates, believed to number some 160 from104 and La Gata, suffering two dead and several wounded, then retired into the woods. A schooner, 80 tons (bm), mounted with one gun, found moored with three cables up a narrow creek, was seized and burnt.

Under Hobson's command, Lion and Union located a pirate schooner, 60 tons (bm), armed with a pivot mounted long gun, in La Carna Bay, Colorados Archipelago, on 30 March. When pursued and fired upon by Lion, Union and two launches from Hyperion, the pirates ran their schooner ashore and escaped. Union freed the schooner and with Lion brought their prize into Port Royal at noon on Tuesday, 6 May 1823. HMS Tamar parted company with Lion and Union on 5 April, bound for Vera Cruz and Portsmouth. Hyperion continued on in the West Indies until 15 May 1824.

Lion and Union went on to capture the pirate vessel Flor de la Mar on 5 June 1823, and with boats of HMS Tyne, captured a pirate felluca on 6 July 1823

Lieutenant Thomas Marriott, commanding HMS Union, died of yellow fever on 17 September 1823. Captain John George Graham of HMS Icarus and Hobson erected his memorial tablet at St Peter's Anglican Church, Port Royal, Jamaica. Hobson was promoted to rank of commander on 18 March 1824, his capture of pirate vessels also earning him the nickname "Lion Hobson".

Assigned to command of the sloop HMS Ferret from 1 January 1825, Hobson now had the company of his nephew on board—Thomas McGwire, midshipman, the eldest son of his sister Mary and Captain William McGwire, RN. McGwire, though, died of yellow fever at Jamaica on 23 September 1825, aged 15 years. "The idol of his uncle's heart", Hobson erected his memorial tablet within St Peter's Anglican Church, Port Royal.

Tasked with abolition of the slave-trade, Hobson and crew of HMS Ferret captured the Spanish schooner Fingal on 3 February 1826. It had run aground near Salt Key, Cuba, in the preceding day or two, having a cargo of 58 African slaves. Hobson brought the schooner in to Havannah, Cuba, on 15 February 1826. Fingal, its owner-master and crew, had sailed from Havannah for Africa on 1 February 1825, and claimed that 17 days after their departure from Africa for Havannah on 1 January 1826, they fell in with a French brig which pressed them to take 61 slaves on board. The owner-master and his crew's accounts having been found to be improbable, the Mixed Commission Court condemned the vessel, to sale by auction, and ordered emancipation of the slaves. From 17 October 1827, respective proportions of the bounty on the pirates and moiety of hull were made available to Hobson, officers and company of HMS Ferret who were present at the capture of Fingal.

Hobson was assigned command (acting) of HMS Scylla, based in Jamaica, on 14 March 1826; the sloop having suffered severe losses though yellow fever. At some point the Spanish 22-gun letter of marque ship Fama encountered and fired into Scylla, killing one of the men. In return Scylla fired a single broadside at Fama, silencing and almost sinking her.

Through frequent visits to Nassau, The Bahamas, he met and married Eliza Ann Elliott, only daughter of Robert Wear Elliott (1784–1830) and Eliza McPherson (–1832), at Nassau, New Providence, The Bahamas, on or about 17 December 1827. They were to have four daughters and a son.

=== United Kingdom ===
Hobson having returned Scylla to Britain to be paid off in mid-1828, Prince William, Duke of Clarence and St Andrews and Lord High Admiral, and Sir Robert Stoppford, Commander-in-Chief, Portsmouth, visited the ship. Prince William expressed the highest commendation of the discipline and condition of the ship, and in consequence promoted Hobson to post captain, from 9 July 1828.

In December 1834 he obtained a commission from the First Lord of the Admiralty – George Eden, 1st Earl of Auckland – to the East Indies on HMS Rattlesnake.

=== New Zealand ===
1839 document appointing Hobson as lieutenant-governor of New Zealand.

In 1837, Bourke sent Hobson, aboard HMS Rattlesnake, to New Zealand' having received news from Busby, the British Resident at the Bay of Islands, of the outbreak of an inter-tribal Maori war. He arrived on 26 May, and two months later, with his task completed, he returned to Sydney and submitted a report that advocated negotiating with Maori for the creating a series of factory enclaves around New Zealand under British sovereignty, similar to that involving the Hudson's Bay Company in North America. Hobson was then sent to India and thence returned to England shortly afterwards to be put on half-pay.

==== Consul and lieutenant-governor ====
By 1838, the need for adequate law and order in New Zealand had become urgent. On 13 August 1839, the government in London appointed Hobson as consul in New Zealand. It also extended the boundaries of New South Wales to include New Zealand and appointed Hobson as lieutenant-governor on 30 July 1839, under the new governor in Sydney, George Gipps. Hobson was then dispatched to New Zealand with instructions to treat with Maori for the cession of the islands. He reached first, Sydney in December 1839, and thence left for the Bay of Islands abourd HMS Herald, arriving on 29 January 1840.

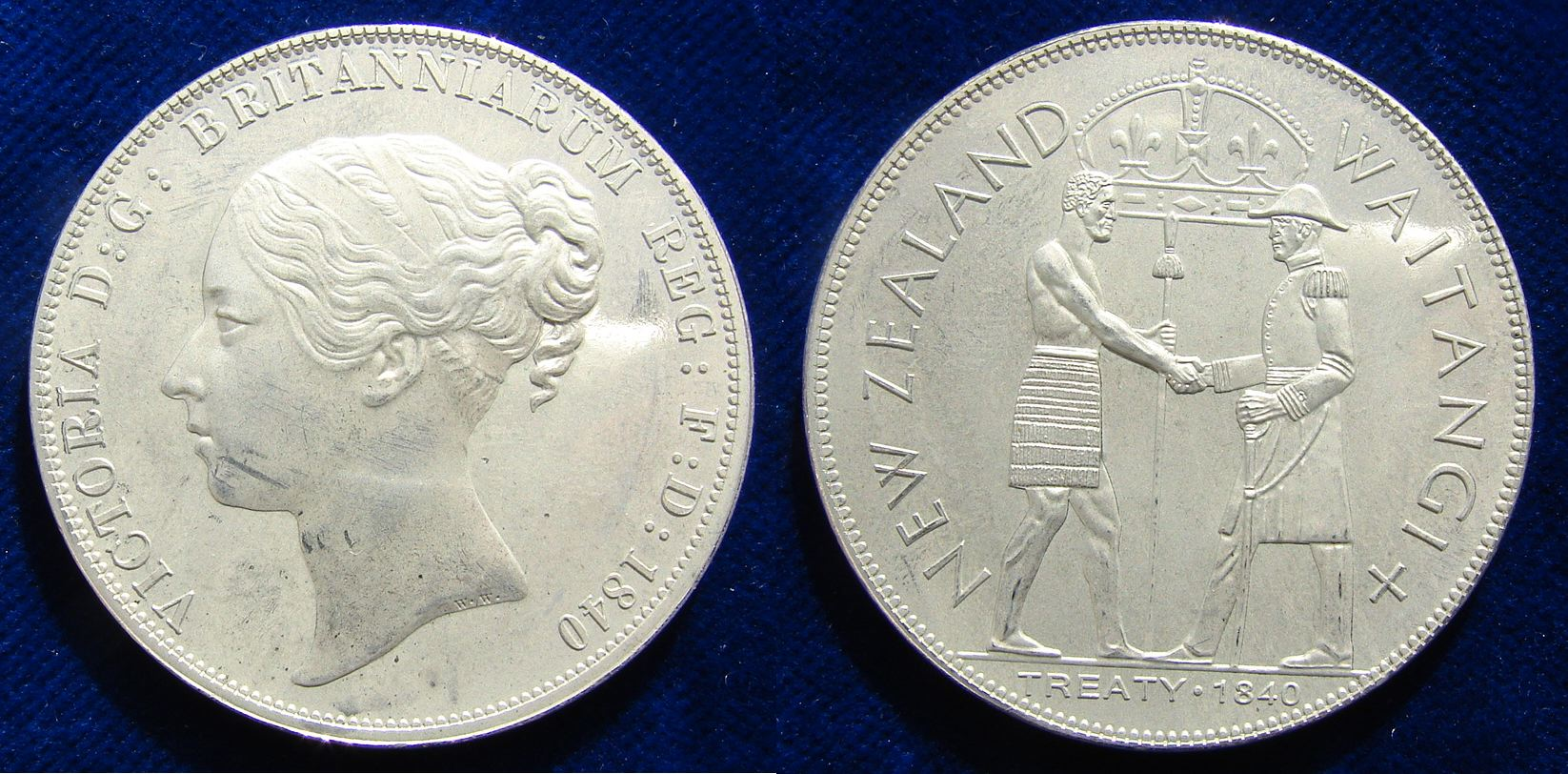
Retro Pattern Crown: Tāmati Wāka Nene shaking hands with Hobson at Waitangi on 6 February 1840

Hobson helped draft what became known as the Treaty of Waitangi and headed the British signatories. As each chief signed, Hobson said "He iwi tahi tātou", meaning "We are [now] one people".

==== Governor ====
In November 1840, the Queen signed a royal charter for New Zealand to become a Crown Colony separate from New South Wales. Hobson was sworn in by the Chief Justice as Governor of New Zealand on 3 May 1841. On the same day, the General Legislative Council came into being, with Hobson in charge of appointing its membership.

== Death ==
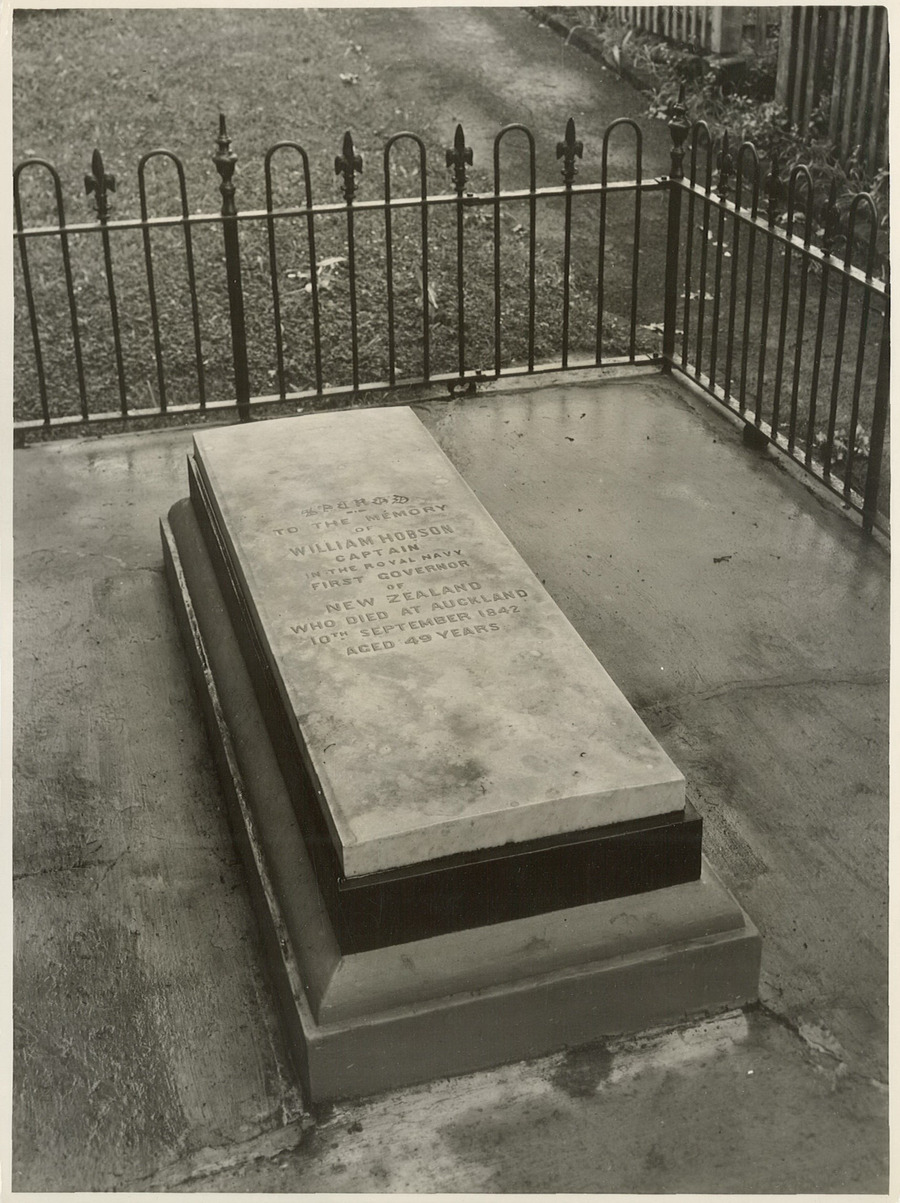
Grave of Captain William Hobson

Hobson suffered a second stroke and, prior to being relieved of office, the Auckland Times reported his death 10 September 1842, which is confirmed on his tombstone. He was buried in the Symonds Street cemetery on Tuesday, 13 September, at a funeral with military honors attended by all government officials, a naval contingent, and (referring only to settlers) "nearly all the respectable inhabitants". A great number of Māori attended his funeral. Uhunga (expressions of grief) were performed as if for one of their own great chiefs. Copies of Ko te Karere o Nui Tireni directed Māori mourners to follow the funeral precession to the burial in the Symonds Street cemetery. Almost every Māori man carried a musket which they fired off once the military salute had been fired. Most of the Māori women had their hair ornamented with wreaths of flowering supplejack.

== Legacy ==
Several places in New Zealand are named after Hobson including:

- Hobsonville, Hobson initially considered this to be a potential site for the Government of New Zealand, but after advice from the Surveyor-General of New Zealand, Felton Matthew this idea was rejected. The area was later named after him.
- Hobson Bay, Auckland
- Mount Hobson, Auckland
- Hobson Hill, a small hill located Northeast of Waitangi, Northland.
- Hobson Street, Auckland
- Hobson Street, Wellington

== Publications ==
- Hobson, William (22 May 1838). "Port Phillip. Directions for Port Phillip, Southern Australia". The Australian. Vol. 5, no. 507. New South Wales, Australia. p. 1 (Supplement to "The Australian.") – via Trove.
