= Command duty officer =

Person who is on watch on a ship

A command duty officer (CDO, on a naval ship) or officer of the watch (OOW, on a merchant ship) is the head duty officer (officer of the day) on a ship, entrusted by the commanding officer and executive officer (on a naval ship) or the shipmaster (on a merchant ship) with exercising in their absence command and control of the ship on their behalf for the duration of a watch.

== Navy ==
In the US Navy, the Command Duty Officer carries out the duties of the commanding officer "in the absence of the commanding officer or the executive officer, or both." The CDO supervises other junior watchkeeping officers such as the officer of the deck. They are typically assigned for ships in port or land naval installations though they may also be found underway on larger warships. While many watchkeepers stand watch for a few hours continuously at a time, CDOs may be on duty for longer periods, such as a day or a week. Whilst the CDO may be outranked by more senior officers on board, the CDO is only subordinate to the commanding officer and executive officer whilst carrying out their duties.

In the Royal Navy, and other navies based upon this structure, other duties may include ceremonial duties (such as carrying out Colours or Sunset) and taking charge in emergency situations in the damage control headquarters. Generally on warships, the holder will be a commissioned junior officer who holds a harbour watchkeeping certificate. In on-shore establishments, a warrant officer may be used to augment the duty roster.

== Merchant marine ==
In port and at sea, the officer of the watch is responsible to the captain for keeping the ship, its crew, and its cargo safe. On watch, he must enforce all applicable regulations, such as safety of life at sea and pollution regulations. In port, the watch focuses on duties such as cargo operations, fire and security watches, monitoring communications, and the anchor or mooring lines.

IMO regulations require the officer be fluent in English. This is required for a number of reasons, such as to use charts and nautical publications, understand weather and safety messages, communication with other ships and coast stations, and to be able to work with a multi-lingual crew.

At sea, the mate on watch has three fundamental duties: to navigate the ship, to safely avoid traffic, and to respond to emergencies. Mates generally stand watch with able seamen who act as helmsman and lookout. The helmsman executes turns and the lookout reports dangers such as approaching ships. These roles are often combined to a single helmsman/lookout and, under some circumstances, can be eliminated completely. The ability to smartly handle a ship is key to safe watchstanding. A ship's draught, trim, speed and under-keel clearance all affect its turning radius and stopping distance. Other factors include the effects of wind and current, squat, shallow water, and similar effects. Shiphandling is key when the need arises to rescue a man overboard, to anchor, or to moor the ship.

The officer must also be able to transmit and receive signals by Morse light and to use the International Code of Signals.

== See also ==
- Duty officer
