= HMS Monkey (1831) =

History

United Kingdom
- Name: Courier
- Launched: 1827
- Fate: Sold 1831

United Kingdom
- Name: HMS Monkey
- Acquired: October 1831
- Fate: Sold 1833

General characteristics
- Type: Schooner
- Tons burthen: 68 (bm)
- Length: 56 ft (17.1 m)
- Beam: 40 ft 3 in (12.3 m)
- Armament: 2 × 12-pounder guns

HMS Monkey was a schooner of the British Royal Navy at the Jamaica station. She was the merchant schooner Courier, built 1827. The Navy purchased her in October 1831 at Bermuda and renamed her Monkey. She remained in service as a tender to HMS Blossom, as a replacement for her predecessor, Monkey, until sold out in August 1833.

There is a prize money notice awarding salvage to those members of Blossom's crew who were aboard Monkey at the saving of the cargo of the brig Charles, of Boston, on 1 May 1832. (Note: A first-class share of the salvage money was worth £138 3s; a sixth-class share, that of an ordinary seaman, was worth £6 18s 1½d.) At the time, Monkey's commander was Lieutenant Samuel Mercer.
