= Duty officer =

Position assigned on a shift or watch

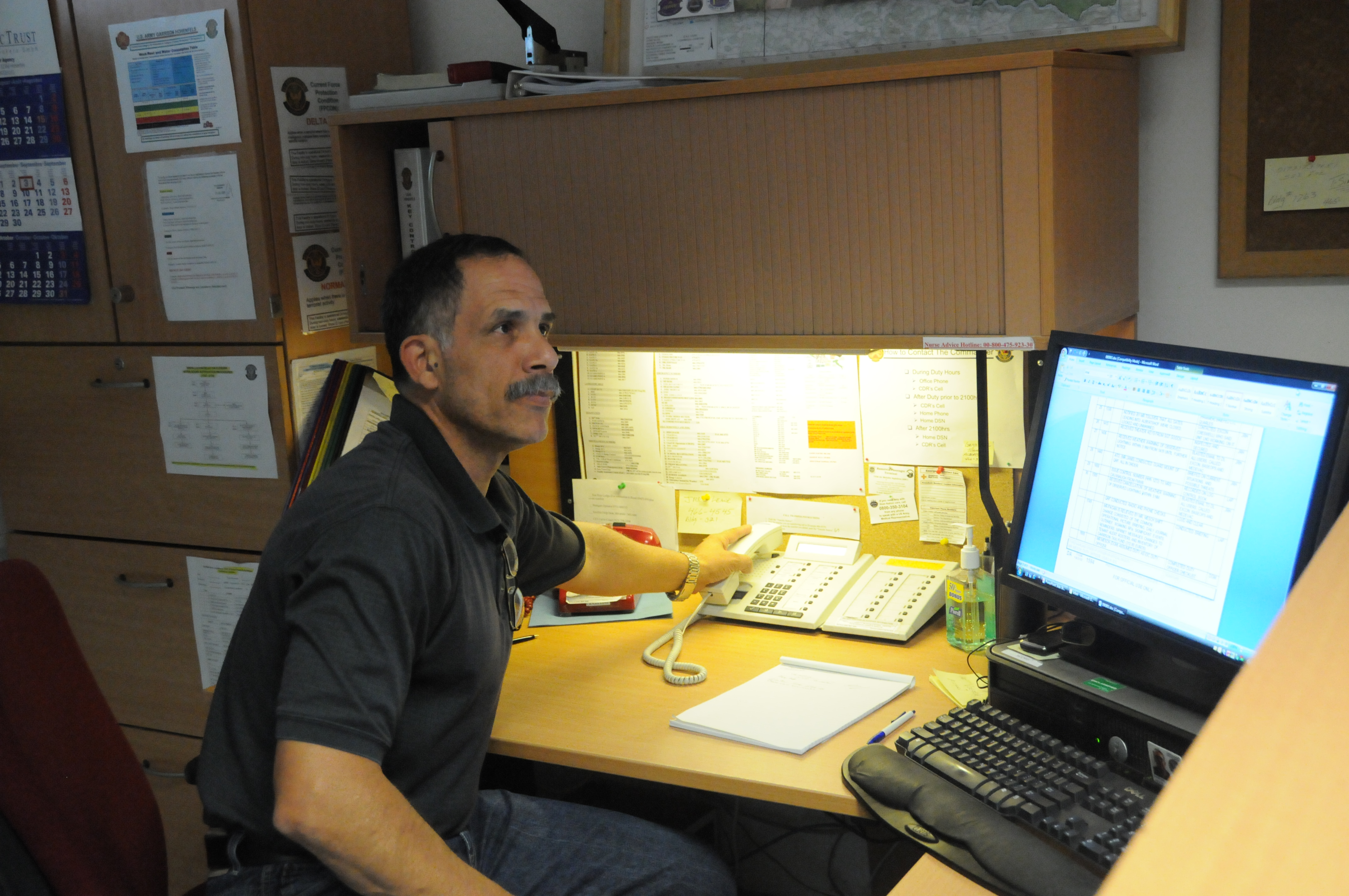
Duty officer at the US Army's Garrison Hohenfels operations center

A duty officer or officer of the day is a worker assigned a position on a regularly rotational basis. While on duty, duty officers attend to administrative tasks and incidents that require attention regardless of the time of day, in addition to the officer's normal duties.

A duty officer is typically assigned to work for a period of time such as 24 to 48 hours, after which they will be relieved by the next duty officer listed on a roster. The outgoing duty officer will turn over relevant data and documentation to the incoming duty officer about the previous day's happenings before returning to their normal duties or resting.

== Military usage ==
In the military, the responsibilities of a duty officer vary depending on the position. Military units may have duty officers that are responsible for the military unit and act as the commanding officer's representative. Certain departments may have duty officers that handle tasks specific to that department after regular working hours. Specialist officers such as dentists, physicians, and lawyers have their own duty officers who are responsible for carrying out the various missions of their respective specialties after hours. Such positions, particularly non-command positions, need not necessarily be held by commissioned officers; they may be filled by non-commissioned officers or warrant officers.

In various navies, the placing of sailors on scheduled duties, including that of officers, is known as watchkeeping. In some naval ships and commands, officer of the day may refer to a specific position of duty officer that represents the commander, namely a command duty officer.

In the Indian Army, the duty officer is in charge of maintaining discipline and order in an Indian Army Unit. They are also in charge of the guards on duty, and conducting inspections of the quarter guard at any time of day or night. A duty officer also has a duty JCO and a duty NCO to assist them in discharging their duties. The duty JCO and duty NCO would be wearing a brassard or an arm band with the words "duty JCO" and "duty NCO" marked on them.

In the United States armed forces, the duty officer is generally in charge of a unit headquarters in the absence of the commander. Their duties include inspection of soldiers on guard duty (also called watchstanders in the Navy), being in charge of quarters at the company and battery level and staff duty NCOs at the battalion level, inspection of the arms rooms, motor pool and unit dining facilities. The duty officer will contact the commander and senior NCOs if emergency messages are sent to the unit. The duty officer usually carries a notebook and briefcase with a series of phone lists and checklists put together by the unit adjutant to guide the officer through their tour of duty.

In the American Civil War, a general officer of the day was a general officer assigned the duties of responding to reports by the picket line, such as a flag of truce.

In the Finnish armed forces, the duty officer (päivystäjä in Finnish), usually a conscript NCO, is responsible for maintaining the order in the unit, monitoring persons entering and leaving it and keeping count of its weapons. Their tour is 24 hours long and they have two assisting officers, usually privates, who cover for duty officer when they are unavailable such as during lunch, dinner, a recreation break and during the night. The duty officer is stationed behind a desk at the unit's main entrance which is usually staffed at all times.

== Corporate usage ==
=== Civil aviation ===
Duty officers are also known in the civil aviation food industry. Following a request of more sophisticated meal controls by air companies, this job has been recently created with the aim of strict control in all meals served in flights, usually for long haul public flights in most international airports. However, airline duty officers might also operate for private companies as for public companies (Such as "Air Canada", "Qatar Airways", "China Airlines"...). The Duty Officer (also known as "DO") operate in the frontline. They are in charge of controlling the right amount of food reserved and received, by interacting with co-workers from independent providers of airline catering and provisioning services. Thus, they have the responsibility to take in charge any problems occurring before the take-off (such as taking orders at the last minute, changing meals for allergies or religious reasons from customers). To validate their work, the DO must interact with the flight crew by making the chief cabin sign a receipt in order to part from their responsibility after the take-off.

Airport DOs, in other hand, work for the airport operator and integrate the many areas of this facility in order to provide the best services to passengers and airlines. They represent the administrator as a person and must decide with a wide range of responsibility - from the car parking lot to the aircraft parking stands. Airport DOs must be able to decide for the best without violate the several norms that drives aviation, environment, public security and everything else adjacent to the airport operation. Due to the wide range of issues to be managed and, especially, without full support from administration by night and weekends, the position requires employees with multi-language and background from airline management, air traffic control or piloting.

=== Station duty officer ===
Station duty officer is a public position in a union, who handles non-emergency calls and other clerical duties for front officers.

== See also ==
- Command duty officer
- Watchkeeping
- Shift work
