= HMS Grecian (1821) =

Cutter of the Royal Navy

History

Great Britain
- Name: HMRC Dolphin
- Builder: Cowes
- Launched: 1799
- Acquired: Sold 1821

United Kingdom
- Name: HMS Grecian
- Acquired: 20 November 1821 by purchase
- Fate: Sold 1827

General characteristics
- Tons burthen: 145 (bm)
- Length: Overall:68 ft 9 1/4 in (21.0 m); Keel:50 ft 9 in (15.5 m)
- Beam: 23 ft 2 1/8 in (7.1 m)
- Depth of hold: 9 ft 6 1/4 in (2.9 m)
- Armament: 2 × 6-pounder guns + 8 × 6-pounder carronades

HMS Grecian was the former Revenue cutter Dolphin, launched at Cowes in 1799, that the Royal Navy purchased in 1821 and renamed. She captured a pirate schooner in 1823. The Royal Navy sold Grecian in 1828.

== Career ==
=== Revenue cutter ===
In late April 1806 Dolphin detained and sent into Penzance Bella, Kallenberg, master, which had been sailing from Baltimore to Bremen. Bella was released and sent on her way on 20 June.

In May Dolphin detained and sent into Penzance the Danish vessel Fortuna, Peterson, master.

On 26 September 1810 Dolphin came upon Valiant, Owen, master, off Land's End. Valiant was waterlogged and in a sinking state. She had been sailing from Bangor to London, and Dolphin brought her into Mount's Bay. There Valiant unloaded her cargo. (Note: Valiant, of 123 tons burthen, E.Owen, master, W.Owen, owner, had been launched at Beaumaris in 1799.)

On 18 December 1812 Dolphin towed Ann into Mount's Bay, Ann, Ancell, master, had been on her way from London to Guadaloupe when she lost her mainmast and rudder. (Note: Ann was a West Indiaman of 213 tons burthen, built in America in 1804, with Ansell, master, and E. Redman, owner. She underwent a "good repair" in 1812.)

=== Royal Navy ===
The Admiralty purchased Dolphin and renamed her HMS Grecian. Lieutenant John Cawley commissioned Grecian on 20 November 1821 for the Jamaica Station.

On 20 March 1823 Grecian captured the pirate schooner Gata, a felucca, and two boats. (Note: A first-class share of the bounty money for the crews of the piratical vessels was worth £497 1s 3d; a sixth-class share, that of an Ordinary Seaman, was worth £9 5s 9¾d.) The Navy acquired Gata and took her into service as HMS Lion.

HMS Scout suffered damage from stranding in May 1823 in the Gulf of Mexico. She might have been lost if Grecian had not rendered assistance.

On 23 May 1824 Grecian arrived at Jamaica with $100,000 that she had carried from Santa Martha (Gran Colombia). (Note: At the time merchants would remit money by entrusting it to the commander of a naval ship. The commander would then receive a commission for the service, a commission that accrued to the commander alone, and not the other officers and crew.)

== Fate ==
Grecian was paid off on 11 May 1825.

The "Principal Officers and Commissioners of His Majesty's Navy" offered the "Grecian cutter, of 145 tons", lying at Portsmouth, for sale on 11 July 1827. She was sold to Mr. Freake, but the sale was cancelled when he was declared insane. The Commissioners offered her again on 18 January 1828. She was sold for £300 to Samuel Phillips.
