= HMS Union (1823) =

History

United Kingdom
- Name: City of Kingston
- Namesake: Kingston, Jamaica
- Launched: 1821
- Fate: Sold 1823

United Kingdom
- Acquired: 1823 by purchase
- Fate: Wrecked 17 May 1828

General characteristics
- Tons burthen: 84 (bm)
- Length: Overall:59 ft 9 in (18.2 m); Keel:44 ft 6 1/4 in (13.6 m)
- Beam: 18 ft 0 in (5.5 m)
- Depth of hold: 6 ft 10 in (2.1 m)
- Sail plan: schooner
- Armament: 3 or 4 guns
- Notes: She was fitted with two centreboards on pivots with the result that she had a draught of only 6 ft 6 in (2.0 m).

HMS Union was the mercantile City of Kingston that the Royal Navy purchased in 1823 for service as a 3-gun schooner. She served in the suppression of the slave trade in the West Indies. She was wrecked in 1828.

== Career ==
On 28 March Union, Lieutenant Marriott commanding, and Lion, Lieutenant William Hobson commanding, were in the Colorados Archipelago off the northwest coast of Cuba when they observed a large schooner. They gave chase until the schooner's crew ran her onto a beach and abandoned her after first setting fire to her. The British took possession of the schooner and removed her cargo, which consisted of goods plundered some time before from a French vessel. The schooner carried three heavy guns, was marked on her mast and sails with the number "104", and had been full of men. The British destroyed her before they left. (Note: Although the report states that Hyperion assisted Lion and Union, a later prize money notice makes it clear that the third vessel was Tamar.)

The next day the British came upon a sloop anchored near the shore in Baja Bay. Lion and Union sent in their boats, together with two launches from HMS Tamar. As they approached the sloop they came under heavy fire from men gathered on the shore. The fire lasted for four-and-a-half hours before the sloop apparently was able to escape, at which time the pirates on shore dispersed into the woods. It was later ascertained that there were some 160 men, consisting of the crew of "104", men from "La Gata", who had escaped when Grecian had captured her, and men from a schooner that the British captured the next day. The pirates had sustained casualties of two men killed and several men wounded; the British suffered no casualties. The British found a schooner of 80 tons (bm) and one gun moored up a narrow creek, apparently being fitted out for a pirate cruize. The British burnt her.

On 30 March Lion, Union, and Hyperion were in Las Carnas Bay in the Colorado Reefs when they came upon a third schooner, this of 80 tons (bm), and armed with one large gun on a pivot mount. When Lion, Union, and two launches from Tamar approached, the crew of the schooner ran her onshore and escaped into the woods. Lion and Union then brought the schooner into Port Royal.

On 5 June Union and Lion captured Flor de la Mar.

On 6 July 1823 Union and Lion, and boats of Tyne captured a pirate felucca.

Lieutenant H.O. Love commissioned Union in September 1824 at Kingston, Jamaica. In October Lieutenant James C. Bennet replaced Love. However, her commander in November was Lieutenant Henderson. While under his command, on 1 November 1823 Union captured the Spanish slave vessel Eugenia. (Note: A 2nd class share was worth £20 13s 5¾d; a sixth-class share, that of an Ordinary Seaman, was worth £1 5s 0½d.)

In March 1825, the frigate HMS Dartmouth, the schooners Lion and Union, and the USS Gallinipper participated in an operation against Cuban pirates. United States Navy Lieutenant Isaac McKeever led an attack against a schooner at the mouth of the Sagua la Grande. American and British forces took the schooner. The attackers killed eight pirates and captured 19 more; the attackers' casualties were only one man wounded. On the following day, the force captured another schooner but the pirates escaped and the vessel was taken without bloodshed.

From 19 June 1825 to August Union was under the command of Lieutenant Charles Elliot. He then took temporary command of Renegade.

On 24 January 1826 Union, Lieutenant A.B.Lowe, captured the Spanish slave schooner Magico. Union sighted Magico on 20 January of the Grand Bahama Bank. An action began with the two vessels exchanging shots. Magico sailed off after half-an-hour, firing her stern chasers at the pursuing Union. The pursuit lasted two days before Magico's crew ran her aground at Manatí, Puerto Rico. Locals helped the crew land some 200 slaves before the crew deserted. Thirty slaves drowned while they were being transferred to the shore. When Union came up she recovered the 200 slaves that had been landed plus 179 who were still on board. When Lowe boarded Magico he had her magazine searched. There the British discovered a keg of powder with a slow-burning match, which they extinguished. (Note: A first-class share of the bounty money for the slaves on her and a portion of the value of her hull and stores was worth £532 13s 8d; a sixth-class share was worth £28 10s 8¼d. A sixth-class share was worth more than a year's salary of an Ordinary Seaman.) (Note: Mágico was a Spanish vessel of five guns, under the command of Captain Jose Ynza. Her slave-trading voyage started in Havana on 26 May 1825 and she acquired her slaves at Popo. Union delivered Mágico and 379 slaves to Havana where the Court of Mixed Commission condemned them.)

In late April, Union gave chase to the Spanish slaver Palowna. The two exchanged fire, which killed three Spaniards. When Union lost his quarry in the dark on 28 April, Lowe anchored. The slaver continued and ran into a coral head. She was holed and sank. Of her 29 crew members and 165 slaves, only her master and three man survived.

Lieutenant Berry Harries commanded Union from August 1826 to May 1827, when Lieutenant Charles Calmady Dent assumed command. While in command of Union, Dent, with two boats, captured a pirate vessel. Dent received promotion to Commander on 5 January 1828, and Lieutenant Charles Madden replaced Dent, only to be replaced by Lieutenant John Wills.

== Loss ==
On 16 March 1828 Lieutenant Wills sailed Union from Port Royal, Jamaica, bound for Havana. He anchored for the night. Next morning he sailed again, only to have to anchor to avoid reefs. When her anchors parted, Union struck the reef and rolled on her side. A boat was launched but overset in the surf. Her masts fell over, which enabled the crew to reach land. In all six men had drowned. The subsequent court martial found that Wills had carried too much sail when close to the land, and had failed to order the regular taking of soundings, with the result that she had struck the Porpoise Rocks at the eastern end of Rose Island. Lieutenant Wills was dismissed the service.
