= HMS Blossom (1806) =

19th-century British Royal Navy ship

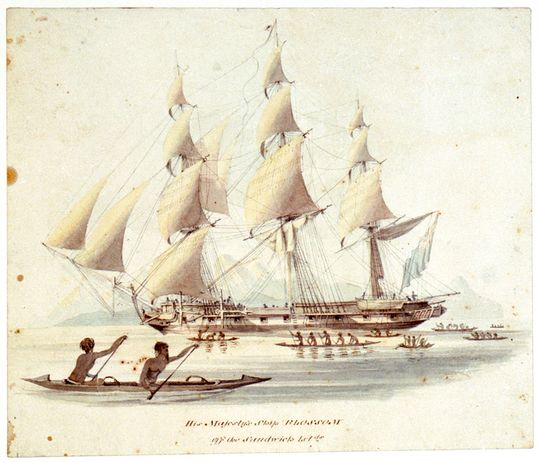
- His Majesty's ship Blossom off the Sandwich Islands

History

United Kingdom
- Name: HMS Blossom
- Ordered: 19 November 1805
- Builder: Robert Guillaume, Northam
- Laid down: February 1806
- Launched: 10 December 1806
- Completed: 21 April 1807
- Reclassified: Exploration ship in 1825; Survey ship in 1829; Hulked in 1833
- Fate: Broken up in August 1848

General characteristics
- Class & type: 18-gun Cormorant-class sloop-of-war
- Tons burthen: 427 bm
- Length: 108 ft 4 1/2 in (33.0 m) (overall); 90 ft 11 1/2 in (27.7 m) (keel)
- Beam: 29 ft 8 3/4 in (9.1 m)
- Depth of hold: 9 ft (2.7 m)
- Sail plan: Full-rigged ship
- Complement: 121
- Armament: (as built); Main deck: 16 × 32-pounder carronades; QD: 6 × 18-pounder carronades; Fc: 2 × 6-pounder guns + 2 × 18-pounder carronades

HMS Blossom was an 18-gun Cormorant-class sloop-of-war. She was built in 1806 and is best known for the 1825–1828 expedition under Captain Beechey to the Pacific Ocean. She explored as far north as Point Barrow, Alaska, the furthest point into the Arctic any non-Inuit had been at the time. She was finally broken up in 1848.

== Napoleonic Wars ==
On 26 February 1808 Blossom was in company with Eclipse when they captured Sally and Hetty, William Fleming, Master. Blossom was in company with Jamaica when they recaptured the American brig Iris.

In the mid-morning of 23 February 1812, Blossom was five leagues (24 km) off Cabrera when a strange schooner sailed towards her, mistaking her for a merchantman. When the schooner realized her mistake a five-hour chase followed before Blossom was able to capture the schooner Jean Bart. Jean Bart was of 147.5 tons (bm) and had been launched in Marseille only five weeks earlier. She was armed with five 12 and two 6-pounder guns, and had a crew of 106 men under the command of Jean Francis Coulome. She had made no captures but within the previous five days her excellent sailing had enabled her to evade two British frigates and a brig.

On 18 August 1812, shortly after the outbreak of war with America, Blossom and Hyacinth were in sight when the letter of marque Sir Alexander Ball captured the American ship Grace Ann Green.

== Post-war ==
Blossom was re-rated as a 24-gun sixth rate in February 1817. Between July 1824 and August 1825, she was at Deptford and Woolwich being converted to serve as an exploration ship in "icy seas". In January 1825 Commander Frederick Beechey commissioned her for exploration of the Pacific Northwest.

In 1917 a copper plate was discovered in the Bonin Islands, inscribed with a message claiming the islands as a British possession:

HBM Ship Blossom Capt F. W. Beechey took possession of this Group of Islands in the Name of and on the behalf of His Britannic Majesty George the IV on the 14th June 1827.

In 1827, Captain Beechey discovered a submerged obstacle in San Francisco Bay, that threatened ships sailing to the young port of San Francisco, California. His soundings revealed that it was a large rock, whose top was 5 feet (1.5 m) below the water line at mean low tide. The rock was previously uncharted, and too large to be removed from the channel by the technology available then. Beechey named the obstacle Blossom Rock, in honour of his ship. Beechey also discovered that two especially prominent giant sequoia trees on the east coast of the bay could serve as a navigational aid to locate the position of the rock, allowing ships to bypass the obstacle and avoid a wreck. (Note: The two trees were thereafter known as "Navigation Trees." They grew in Alameda County, California in what is now Roberts Regional Recreation Area until the early 1850s, when they were cut down by loggers.) This location is marked by California Historical Landmark #962, "Blossom Rock Navigation Trees." In 1870, American military engineers, led by R. S. Williamson, were able to develop technology adequate to remove enough of Blossom Rock to mitigate the hazard to ships.

Blossom was paid off in May 1828. Between April and August 1829, she was at Woolwich being fitted as a survey ship. In May, Richard Owen recommissioned her for the Jamaica station. She remained there until some point in 1832. While she was there the 1-gun schooner Monkey served as Blossom's ship's tender until Monkey wrecked in 1831. The Navy then purchased a second schooner to function as a tender for Blossom, and renamed the tender Monkey. The Navy sold Monkey after Blossom returned to Britain in 1832.

== Fate ==
Blossom was hulked as a lazarette at Sheerness in January 1833, and was broken up at Chatham in August 1848.

== See also ==
- European and American voyages of scientific exploration
- Blossom Point, Wrangel Island, named after the ship.
