= HMS Lion (1823) =

History
- Name: Gata
- Namesake: Cape Gata
- Builder: Baltimore
- Launched: 1820
- Captured: 20 March 1823

United Kingdom
- Name: HMS Lion
- Acquired: 20 March 1823 by capture
- Fate: Sold 15 May 1826

General characteristics
- Tons burthen: 88 (bm)
- Length: Overall:61 ft 8 in (18.8 m); Keel:43 ft 0 1/4 in (13.1 m)
- Beam: 19 ft 7 in (6.0 m)
- Depth of hold: 5 ft 9 in (1.8 m)
- Sail plan: schooner
- Complement: 31
- Armament: 1 × 12-pounder gun

HMS Lion was the pirate schooner Gata, built in Baltimore in 1820, that the Royal Navy captured in 1823 and took into service. She took part in numerous expeditions against pirates, recaptured some of their prizes, and captured a slave ship. The Navy sold her in 1826.

== Career ==
On 20 March 1823 HMS Grecian captured the pirate schooner La Gata, a felucca, and two boats. The Navy acquired Gata and took her into service as Lion. Her initial role was ship's tender to HMS Serapis, which was serving as a storeship at Jamaica.

Lieutenant William Hobson commissioned Lion in March.

On 28 March Lion and Union, Lieutenant Marriott, commanding, were in the Colorados Archipelago off the northwest coast of Cuba when they observed a large schooner. They gave chase until the schooner's crew ran her onto a beach and abandoned her after first setting fire to her. The British took possession of the schooner and removed her cargo, which consisted of goods plundered some time before from a French vessel. The schooner carried three heavy guns, was marked on her mast and sails with the number "104", and had been full of men. The British destroyed her before they left. (Note: Although the report states that Hyperion assisted Lion and Union, a later prize money notice makes it clear that the third vessel was Tamar.)

The next day the British came upon a sloop anchored near the shore in Baja Bay. Lion and Union sent in their boats, together with two launches from HMS Tamar. As they approached the sloop they came under heavy fire from men gathered on the shore. The fire lasted for four-and-a-half hours before the sloop apparently was able to escape, at which time the pirates on shore dispersed into the woods. It was later ascertained that there were some 160 men, consisting of the crew of "104", men from "La Gata", who had escaped when Grecian had captured her, and men from a schooner that the British captured the next day. The pirates had sustained casualties of two men killed and several men wounded; the British suffered no casualties. The British found a schooner of 80 tons (bm) and one gun moored up a narrow creek, apparently being fitted out for a pirate cruize. The British burnt her.

On 30 March Lion, Union, and Tamar were in Las Carnas Bay in the Colorado Reefs when they came upon a third schooner, this of 80 tons (bm), and armed with one large gun on a pivot mount. When Lion, Union, and two launches from Tamar approached, the crew of the schooner ran her onshore and escaped into the woods. Lion and Union then brought the schooner into Port Royal.

Tamar parted from Lion and Union on 5 April, bound for Vera Cruz and Portsmouth.

On 5 June Lion and Union captured Flor de la Mar.

On 6 July 1823 Lion and Union, and boats of HMS Tyne captured a pirate felucca.

Hobson received a promotion to Commander on 18 March 1824. His replacement as captain of Lion was Francis Liardet, who was promoted to Lieutenant and command on 18 March. During his tenure, Lion participated in the destruction of several nests of pirates on the coast of Cuba, and captured nine of their vessels, some of their prizes, and a slave ship.

On 26 June Lion and Assiduous captured a pirate schooner.

On 24 November the French ship Calypso, Ducoumier, master, arrived at Key West with a full cargo of coffee. Pirates had captured Calypso as she was on her way to Havre from St Domingo. The pirates had killed half the crew; the rest had jumped overboard. The schooners USS Beagle and Lion had recaptured Calypso, together with her pirate crew.

On 14 December 1824 Lion, Lieutenant Liardet commanding, captured the slave ship Relampago (Sp: lightning flash), at 23°8′N 79°17′W, about 200 miles east of Havana. Lion and Relampago arrived at Havana on 18 December. There Lieutenant Liardet stated to the Court of Mixed Commission that Lion was a tender to HMS Carnation, and that Captain Maclean of Carnation was authorized to seize Spanish vessels engaged in the illicit slave trade. Carnation arrived at Havana on the 19th, and the mixed commission condemned Relampago on the 23rd. The court found that Relampago, Don Lucas Padron, owner, and Don Jozé Garay, master, had sailed from Havana in May for Africa with papers indicating that she was intending to trade in lawful commerce and not engage in the slave trade. When captured, Melampago had 159 slaves on board, having embarked some 162, with three having died on the way; another eight died while the case was being heard and one man was missing, believed to have fallen overboard due to extreme weakness. Liardet was able to land 150 persons, but two more died while their certificates of emancipation were being prepared. Captain Garay testified that he had accepted the slaves in payment for the goods he had brought, the King at Mesarcoh (Grand Mesurado) being unwilling to pay with gold dust or other commodities. The captain had also taken on board six men from the Spanish schooner Biscayna, which had been lost on the coast of Africa. (Note: Relámpago was sold and by July 1825 was sailing to Africa under another name.)

In March 1825, the frigate HMS Dartmouth, the schooners Lion and Union, and the USS Gallinipper participated in an operation against Cuban pirates. United States Navy Lieutenant Isaac McKeever led an attack against a schooner at the mouth of the Sagua la Grande. American and British forces took the schooner. The attackers killed eight pirates and captured 19 more; the attackers' casualties were only one man wounded. On the following day, the force captured another schooner but the pirates escaped and the vessel was taken without bloodshed. Lion brought the captured pirates into Kingston.

On 5 October 1825 Lion, under the command of Lieutenant Edward Smith, captured the Spanish brigantine Isabel. Isabel, Pedro Blanco, master, had sailed from Havana on 1 August 1824. She had acquired slaves at Gallinhas. When Lion captured Isabel her master was Vicente Gomez, and she had 50 slaves aboard. It is possible that Gomez had stolen Isabel while her owner was on shore buying slaves. When Lion started to pursue Isabel, Gomez ran her on shore. He escaped ashore, together with his crew and most of the slaves. Lion retrieved Isabel and the ten slaves still on board, and brought them into Havana where the Court of Mixed Commission condemned her.

== Fate ==
The Navy sold Lion on 15 May 1826.
