= Newton (surname) =

Surname

The surname Newton is a toponymic surname, derived from the common place name "New-town". "As nearly every county has its ... Newton," there are many independent families that share this surname.

The most well-known bearer of the name was Isaac Newton, and he is usually the one meant when a reference is made to "Newton" without qualification. The surname may also refer to:

== People ==
=== A ===
- A. Edward Newton (1864–1940), American industrialist, author and book collector
- Abba Verbeck Newton (1908–1996), American mathematician
- Alan Newton (disambiguation), multiple people
- Albert Newton (disambiguation), multiple people
- Alfred Newton (1829–1907), British zoologist and ornithologist
- Algernon Newton (1880–1968), British artist
- Amanda Newton (illustrator) (c. 1860–1943), American botanical illustrator
- Arthur Newton (cricketer) (1862–1952), Somerset and Oxford University cricketer
- Arthur F. H. Newton (1883–1959), British athlete
- Arthur L. Newton (1883–1956), American athlete
- Arthur Newton, a character in the film 12.10
- Amanda Newton (netball) (born 1977), English former netball player
- Arthur Newton (cricketer) (1862–1952), English cricketer

=== B ===
- Basil Newton (1889–1965), British ambassador
- Becki Newton (born 1978), American actress
- Ben Newton (disambiguation), multiple people
- Benjamin Wills Newton (1807–1899), English theologian, early leader of the Plymouth Brethren
- Bert Newton (1938–2021), Australian television personality
- Bill Newton (disambiguation), multiple people
- Brian Newton (born 1966), American basketball player

=== C ===
- Cam Newton (born 1989), American football player
- Cam Newton (ice hockey) (born 1950), National Hockey League goaltender
- Cam Newton (safety) (born 1982), American former football player
- Cecil Newton (born 1986), American football player and brother of Cam
- Charles Newton (disambiguation), multiple people
- Christopher Newton (disambiguation), multiple people
- Clara Chipman Newton (1846–1936), an American china painter
- Conor Newton (born 1991), English football player

=== D ===
- David Newton (disambiguation), multiple people

=== E ===
- Edward Newton (disambiguation), multiple people
- Edwin Tulley Newton (1840–1930), British palaeontologist
- Emanuel Newton (born 1984), American mixed martial artist
- Ernie Newton (disambiguation), multiple people
- Esther Newton (born 1940), American cultural anthropologist

=== F ===
- Frances Newton (disambiguation), multiple people
- Frank Newton (disambiguation), multiple people
- Frederick Newton (disambiguation), multiple people, also includes Frederic and Fred

=== G ===
- Gilbert Stuart Newton (1795–1835), British artist
- George Newton (disambiguation), multiple people

=== H ===
- Hal Newton (1933–2014), Canadian football player
- Harold Newton (1904–1963), American painter
- Sir Harry Newton, 2nd Baronet (1875–1951), British politician
- Harry Newton (cricketer) (1935–2014), English cricketer
- Helmut Newton (1920–2004), German photographer
- Henry Newton (disambiguation), multiple people
- Hibbert Alan Stephen Newton (1887–1949), known as Alan Newton (surgeon), Australian surgeon
- Hubert Anson Newton (1830–1896), English astronomer
- Huey P. Newton (1942–1989), founder of Black Panther Party

=== I ===
- Ian Newton (born 1940), English ornithologist
- Irene Newton (1915–1992), English artist
- Isaac Newton (1642–1727), English physicist, mathematician, alchemist, and philosopher
- Isaac Newton (agriculturalist) (1800–1867), American agriculturalist
- Dr.Isaac Newton (1947–1950), Director of Medical Services of Hong Kong

=== J ===
- Jack Newton (disambiguation), multiple people
- Jake Newton (footballer) (born 1984), Guyanese footballer
- Jake Newton (ice hockey) (born 1988), American ice hockey player
- James Newton (disambiguation), multiple people
- Jerjuan Newton (born 2001), American football player
- Jer'Zhan Newton (born 2002), American football player
- John Newton (disambiguation), multiple people
- Joseph Newton (disambiguation), multiple people, includes Joe and Joey Newton
- Josh Newton (musician) (born 1973), American musician
- Josh Newton (American football) (born 2000), American football player
- Joy Newton (1913–1996), English ballet dancer and teacher
- Juice Newton (born 1952), American singer

=== K ===
- Keith Newton (prelate) (born 1952), English prelate of the Roman Catholic Church
- Keith Newton (footballer) (1941–1998), English international footballer
- Kathryn Newton (born 1997), American actress

=== L ===
- Lauren Newton (singer) (born 1952), European musician
- Lee Newton (born 1985), American YouTube personality
- Luke Newton (born 1993), English actor

=== M ===
- Margaret Newton (1887–1971), Canadian plant pathologist and mycologist
- Margit Evelyn Newton (born 1962), Italian actress
- Mark Newton (politician) (born 1960), American politician
- Mark Charan Newton (born 1981), British fantasy author
- Mark J. Newton, convicted child sexual abuser
- Martha Elizabeth Newton (1941–2020), British bryologist and botanist
- Matt Newton (born 1977), American actor
- Matthew Newton (born 1977), Australian actor
- Matty Newton (born 1984), Australian songwriter, bass player, guitarist, keyboardist, and producer
- Maxwell Newton (1929–1990), Australian media publisher
- Michael Newton (disambiguation), multiple people
- Mike Newton (disambiguation), multiple people
- Milt Newton (born 1965), American former basketball player
- Morgan Newton (born 1991), American former football player

=== N ===
- Nate Newton (American football) (born 1961), former NFL offensive lineman
- Nell Jessup Newton, American lawyer and professor
- Norman Newton, American landscape architect

=== O ===
- Olivia Newton-John (1948–2022), English-Australian singer, songwriter, actress, entrepreneur, and activist
- Ollie Newton (born 1988), New Zealand cricketer
- Omari Newton, Canadian actor

=== P ===
- Pania Newton, New Zealand lawyer and activist
- Patti Newton (born 1945), Bert Newton's wife
- Paul Newton (disambiguation), multiple people
- Paula Newton (born 1968), Canadian anchor and correspondent for CNN
- Peter Newton (kayaker) (born 1970), American sprint kayaker
- Peter Newton (winemaker) (1926–2008), English-born American winemaker

=== R ===
- Richard Newton (disambiguation), multiple people
- Robert Newton (disambiguation), multiple people
- Ross Newton (born 1967), Australian actor

=== S ===
- Samuel B. Newton (1868–1932), American college football coach
- Samuel Newton (sport shooter) (1881–1944), Canadian sport shooter
- Sarah Newton (born 1961), British politician
- Sean Newton (born 1988), English footballer
- Stephen Newton (1853–1916), English cricketer
- Stephen Newton (artist) (born 1948), British artist
- Stephen Hibbert Newton (born 1955), Australian teacher
- Steve Newton (born 1941), American basketball coach
- Sydney Newton (1875–1960), English photographer
- Syvelle Newton (born 1985), American college football player

=== T ===
- Thandiwe Newton (born 1972), English actress
- Theodore Newton (actor) (1904–1963), American actor
- Thomas Newton (disambiguation), multiple people
- Todd Newton (born 1970), American game show host
- Tony Newton (disambiguation), multiple people
- Tristen Newton (born 2001), American basketball player
- Tyler Newton (born 1982), American basketball player

=== V ===
- Virgil Miller Newton (born 1938), Antiochian Orthodox priest and former head of controversial teen drug-rehabilitation facilities

=== W ===
- Walter Newton (1880–1941), American politician
- Wayne Newton (born 1942), American singer and entertainer
- Wes Newton (born 1977), English darts player
- Williams Newton (1893–1970), American college sports coach
- William Ellis Newton (1919–43), Australian Victoria Cross recipient

== See also ==
- Newton baronets
- Newton (disambiguation), multiple people
