= Mark Newton =

Mark Newton may refer to:

- Mark Newton (politician) (born 1960), member of the Georgia House of Representatives
- Mark Charan Newton (born 1981), British fantasy author
- Mark J. Newton, child sexual abuser, see Mark J. Newton and Peter Truong
