= Thomas Newton (disambiguation) =

Thomas Newton (1704–1782) was an English cleric, biblical scholar and author.

Thomas Newton may also refer to:

- Thomas Newton (politician) (died 1399), London member of Parliament
- Thomas Newton (poet) (c. 1542–1607), English physician, poet and translator
- Thomas Newton Jr. (1768–1847), American politician
- Thomas Newton Jr. (mayor), (died 1807), American politician
- Thomas Willoughby Newton (1804–1853), Whig member of the United States House of Representatives from the State of Arkansas
- Thomas Newton (footballer) (c. 1890s–1924), English football goalkeeper
- Thomas Walter Francis Newton (1862–1903), English architect
- Tom Newton Dunn (born 1973), English broadcast journalist
- Thomas Jerome Newton (disambiguation), for various fictional characters
