= James Newton =

James Newton may refer to:

- James Newton (New South Wales politician) (1850–1913)
- James Newton (Tasmanian politician) (1864–1929)
- James Newton (flutist) (born 1953), an American flutist
- James Todd Newton (born 1970), American television personality
- James William Newton (1831–1906), claimed to have invented the foghorn technique by using loud and low notes
- James Newton (footballer) (1898–?), English footballer
- James O. Newton (1882–1938), American football and basketball coach
- James P. Newton (fl. 1890s–1900s), African American photographer

== See also ==
- James Newton Howard (born 1951), American composer
- Jamie Newton (fl. 2000s), American contestant of Survivor: Guatemala
- Jim Newton, a main character in the TV series Fury, played by Peter Graves
