= Harold Newton (disambiguation) =

Harold Newton is an artist.

Harold Newton may also refer to:

- Harold Newton (cricketer)
- Hal Newton, Harold Newton, Canadian football player

== See also ==
- Harry Newton (disambiguation)
