= John T. Newton =

American naval officer (1793–1857)

John Thomas Newton
- Born: May 20, 1793; Alexandria, Virginia, US
- Died: July 28, 1857 (aged 64); Washington, D.C., US
- Burial place: Congressional Cemetery
- Relatives: Thomas Willoughby Newton (brother); Robert C. Newton (nephew); Charles Campbell Worthington (grandson)
- Military career
- Allegiance: United States
- Branch: United States Navy
- Service years: 1809–1857
- Rank: Commodore
- Commands: USS Beagle; USS Spark; USS St. Louis; USS Fulton; USS Missouri; Pensacola Navy Yard; Home Squadron
- Conflicts: War of 1812: Capture of HMS Peacock; Capture of HMS Penguin
- Awards: Congressional silver medal

Commodore John Thomas Newton (May 20, 1793 – July 28, 1857) was an officer in the United States Navy who commanded several ships over a period of decades, undertaking missions in the Caribbean and leading the first crossing of the Atlantic by an American steam-powered warship. He was court-martialed following a fire that destroyed that vessel, but his suspension from service was remitted by President John Tyler, after which Newton commanded Pensacola Navy Yard and the Home Squadron for periods. He died while serving in his last post as president of a Naval Court of Inquiry.

== Early life and family ==
He was born in Alexandria, Virginia, to William Newton. He was the brother of U.S. Representative Thomas Willoughby Newton, the only person ever elected to the U.S. House of Representatives from Arkansas as a member of the Whig Party. His nephew was Confederate Colonel Robert C. Newton who served as a major general in the state militia. His daughter Sara Jane married Henry Rossiter Worthington, who founded the American Society of Mechanical Engineers; their son, Charles Campbell Worthington, was partly responsible for founding the Professional Golfers Association.

== Naval career ==
Newton joined the Navy on January 16, 1809 and was commissioned on July 24, 1813.

He served with distinction on the USS Hornet. Lieutenant Newton was awarded a presentation sword in 1817 by the city of Alexandria for gallantry during the February 24, 1813 sinking of HMS Peacock by Hornet. On March 23, 1815, Hornet captured HMS Penguin, not having received word that the War of 1812 had ended. Captain James Biddle was awarded a Congressional Gold Medal on February 10, 1820 in recognition of this victory, while Newton and others among the crew were awarded silver medals. As of March 20, 1820, Lieutenant Newton was still stationed on Hornet.

=== Early commands ===
Lieutenant Commandant Newton commanded the schooner USS Beagle on her maiden voyage to the Caribbean, sailing on February 15, 1823 from Hampton Roads with Commodore David Porter's squadron. On June 12, Porter ordered Newton to deliver letters to various military governors, as well as the admiral stationed in Jamaica, and also to suppress piracy. Beagle and USS Greyhound reconnoitered Cape Cruz, Cuba, on July 21. Both captains went ashore. Though they found nothing, while they were returning to their ships they came under fire. The next day, the Americans found and destroyed a pirate base, capturing eight armed boats, though the pirates were able to escape an attempted encirclement. In September of that year, the ship put in at Thompson's Island, where an outbreak of disease was underway, leading to the deaths of a number of members of the crew, though Newton was spared. Beagle and several other stricken ships had to return home to obtain new crews.

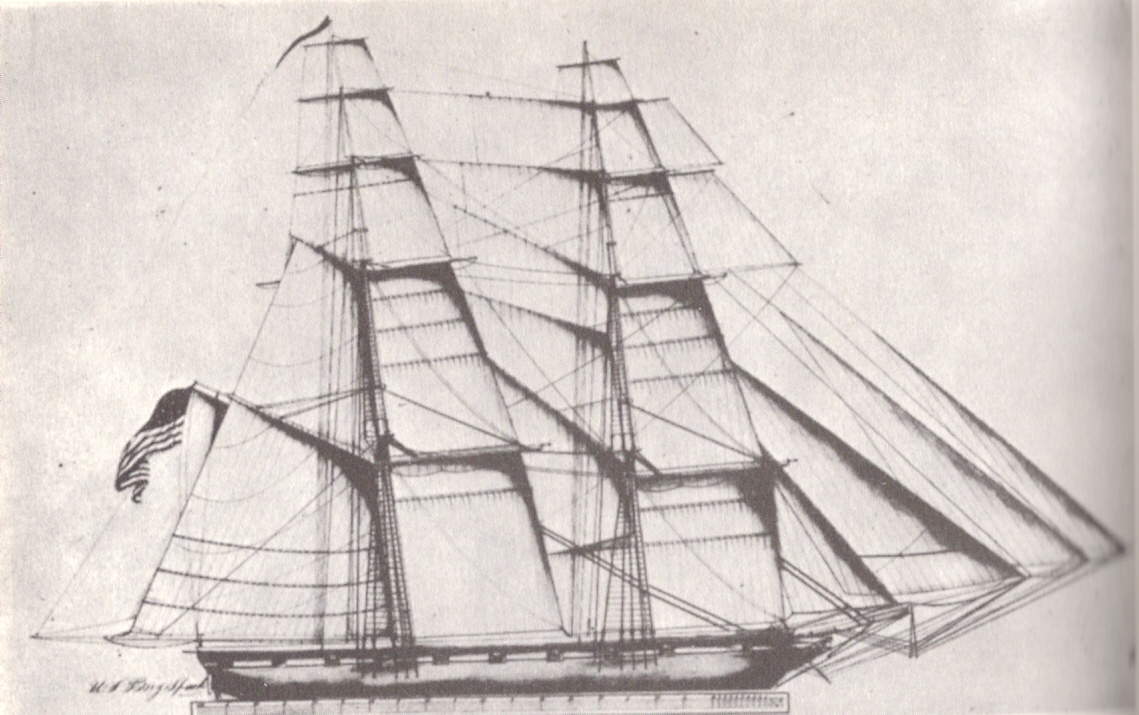
Sail plan of USS Spark

By 1824, Newton was in command of the brig USS Spark. Landing at the Isla de Mona in February of that year, Newton found papers and property from the brig William Henry out of Baltimore, which had been captured by pirates. The following year, Lieutenant-Commandant Newton searched the south coast of Cuba for pirates for three months, following the orders of Commodore Lewis Warrington dated April 30, 1825. He had no success and sailed for Trinidad on June 7, arriving on June 13. In July, Newton and his crew were stricken with "severe sickness"; four men died. Having heard of a Colombian privateer harassing American shipping, Newton sailed sometime in July to seek it out. Making no sighting, Spark arrived at Matanzas, Cuba, on August 8.

In 1832, USS St. Louis, under Commander Newton, joined the West Indies Squadron and, until 1838, sailed the Caribbean, fighting piracy and the slave trade and protecting American commerce. Among the crew under Newton's command was future admiral Benjamin F. Sands, who wrote of an August 1833 experience while the ship was docked in New York Harbor:

Captain Newton was very polite to the party [of Sands' visiting family members], which particularly gratified me; but when they left to continue their eastern trip and I was starting for Washington, the complimentary letter he gave me was more than gratifying, as I had remembered a number of little tiffs in the course of the cruise... still the merry twinkle in his eyes often told me that there was no angry feeling mixed up with his manner of discharging his official duties, although I was rather a noisy midshipman, and must have annoyed him often. Once he was compelled to suspend me from duty to preserve a proper discipline and to furnish an example to other midshipmen (as the French say, "pour encourager les autres"—the reason they assigned for the shooting of poor old Admiral Byng by the English for his failure at Port Mahone!); but I was soon restored to duty, and I could at the end of the cruise see that, whilst strictly disciplining me whenever my shortcomings were noticed, he was a good friend to me.

=== Crises, court-martial, and return to service ===
In 1841, Captain Newton was in command of USS Fulton. Experiments in gunnery and projectiles were conducted aboard under the direction of Captain Matthew C. Perry; during one such experiment, a gun burst, killing several men and wounding others. Newton had been aboard with Commodore Isaac Chauncey, who was inspecting the ship, and the two had left "only 10 or 15 minutes before the explosion".

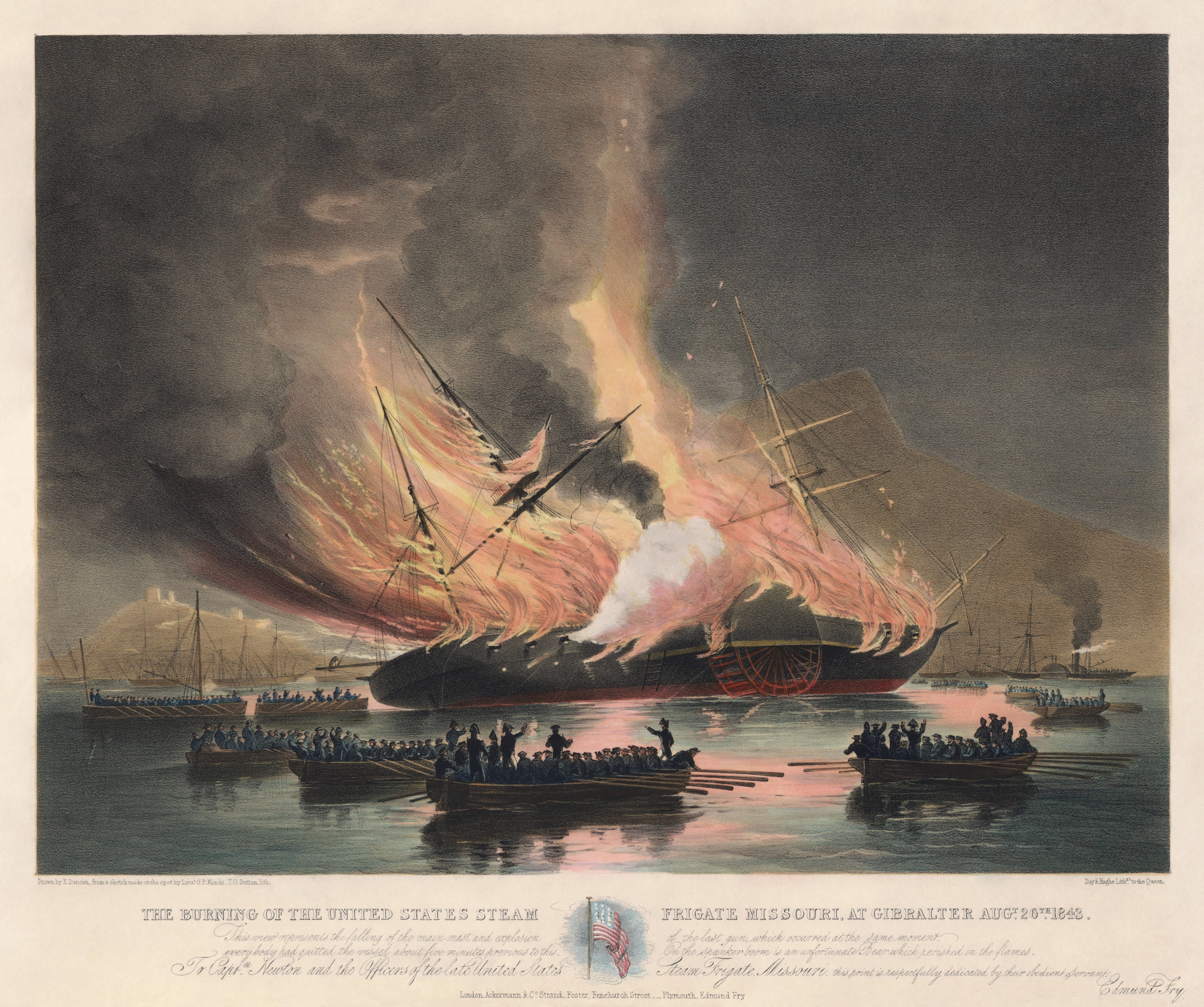
USS Missouri on fire at Gibraltar, 1843 painting by Edward Duncan

Captain Newton commanded USS Missouri during her historic 1843 crossing of the Atlantic, the first by a steam-powered American warship. Missouri arrived at Gibraltar on August 25 and anchored in its harbor. On the night of the 26th, the engineer's yeoman accidentally broke a demijohn of turpentine in a storeroom. The chemical dripped down to the floor below, where it was ignited by an open lamp (which was lit contrary to US naval regulations). The flames spread so rapidly that the Missouri's crew had to abandon ship, though Newton reported that there were no deaths. Newton was subsequently court-martialed for negligence in the loss of the ship, with the trial being carried out from September to October 1844. He was convicted and sentenced to a suspension from service, but on March 3, 1845, President John Tyler remitted the remaining portion of the suspension, writing in his order effecting this remittance that "there is nothing implicating in the slightest degree the moral standing of Captain Newton".

Newton was the commandant of Pensacola Navy Yard in Florida from 1848 to 1852, requesting and receiving a visit from the touring teetotalist reformer Father Mathew to that facility in January 1851. As commodore, he commanded the Home Squadron, with the USS Columbia as his flagship, from March 1852 until March 1855. During this time, he undertook a voyage to Havana, Cuba, where he refused to salute the Spanish flag "on account of discourteous language used towards the President and authorities of the United States by the public journals, under the authority of the Captain General of Cuba". Newton's conduct in this matter "met with the full approval" of President Franklin Pierce upon Newton's return to the United States in April 1854. In December 1854, Newton traveled to Nicaragua to confer with an English counterpart on undisclosed matters. Newton was president of one of three Naval Courts of Inquiry in Washington, D.C., at the time of his death.

== Death ==
Newton died on July 28, 1857, in Washington, D.C., at age 64, of apoplexy, while visiting the residence of Charles Winder. The Brooklyn Daily Eagle reported at the time of his death that Newton "considered Brooklyn as his home", and that he "had a large circle of relatives and friends in this city". The Washington Evening Star reported that it had "stopped the press" with their edition of the day half-worked off to add the announcement of his death. Volunteer companies of the District of Columbia were ordered to attend his funeral. The members of the three Naval Courts of Inquiry met thereafter and appointed a committee to draft resolutions commemorating Newton, which were published in The Washington Union and transmitted to Newton's family. He was buried at the Congressional Cemetery.
