= Harry Newton =

Harry Newton is the name of:

- Sir Harry Newton, 2nd Baronet (1875–1951), British Conservative politician
- Harry Newton (cricketer) (1935–2014), English cricketer

== See also ==
- Harold Newton (disambiguation)
- Henry Newton (disambiguation)
