= You're So Cool =

You're So Cool may refer to

== Songs ==
- "You're So Cool" (The Cyclones song), 1981
- "You're So Cool" (Mark Williams ZNZ song), 1993
- "You're So Cool" (Hans Zimmer song), theme for the 1993 film True Romance
- "You're So Cool" (Taking Back Sunday song), 2006
- "You're So Cool" (The Orion Experience song), 2008
- "You're So Cool" (Patty Loveless song), 2009
- "You're So Cool" (Roger Shah song), 2009
- "You're So Cool" (Tyler Rix song), 2009
- "You're So Cool" (Streamer Bendy song), 2010
- "You're So Cool" (The History of Apple Pie song), 2013
- "You're So Cool" (Jonathan Bree song), 2017
- "You're So Cool" (Muskets song), 2017
- "You're So Cool" (Tate McRae song), 2022
- "Baby You're So Cool", 1997 Espen Lind song
- "You're So Cool, I'm So Freaky", 2013 Kate Nash song
