= Stephen Newton (disambiguation) =

Stephen Newton (1853–1916) was an English cricketer.

Stephen Newton may also refer to:

- Stephen Hibbert Newton (born 1955), Australian teacher
- Stephen Newton (artist) (born 1948), British artist

== See also ==
- Steve Newton (born 1941), American basketball coach
- Newton (disambiguation)
- Newton (surname)
