= Frank Newton =

Frank Newton may refer to:

- Leo Newton (1888–1939), full name Leonard Frank Newton, Welsh international footballer
- Frank Newton (cricketer) (1909-1973), New Zealand cricketer
- Frank Newton (footballer, born 1882) (1882–1959), English footballer
- Frank Newton (forward, born 1902) (1902–?), English footballer
- Frank Newton (defender, born 1902), English footballer
- Frank Newton (racing driver), British racing driver and engineer
- Frankie Newton (1906–1954), jazz trumpeter

== See also ==
- Francis Newton (disambiguation)
