= Robert Newton (disambiguation) =

Robert Newton (1905–1956) was an English stage and film actor.

Robert Newton may also refer to:

- Robert Newton (hurdler) (born 1981), British hurdler
- Robert C. Newton (1840–1877), lawyer and Confederate General in Arkansas during the American Civil War
- Robert Russell Newton (1918–1991), American physicist, astronomer and historian of science
- Robert E. Newton (born 1931), American politician in the state of Iowa
- Robert Newton (Canadian academic administrator) (1889–1985), Canadian scientist and president of the University of Alberta
- Robert Newton (English academic administrator), rector of Exeter College, Oxford
- Bob Newton (American football) (born 1949), former American football guard
- Bob Newton (footballer, born 1946), English footballer
- Bob Newton (footballer, born 1956), English footballer
- Rob Newton (footballer) (born 1953), Australian footballer who played for Essendon
- Rob Newton (cricketer) (born 1990), English cricket player
- Bob Newton, character in Alias John Preston
