= A. E. Newton =

A. E. Newton may refer to:

- Arthur Newton (cricketer), Somerset and Oxford University cricketer
- A. Edward Newton, American author, publisher, and book collector
