= Newton-John =

Newton-John is a surname. Notable people with the surname include:

- Brinley Newton-John (1914–1992), Welsh-Australian professor of German literature, intelligence officer, and Wing Commander during the Second World War
- Emerson Newton-John (born 1974), American racing driver
- Olivia Newton-John (1948–2022), English-born Australian singer, songwriter and actress

== See also ==
- Newton (surname)
- John (surname)
