= Nightfall (2000 film) =

- Home video cover art
- Directed by: Gwyneth Gibby
- Written by: Isaac Asimov; John William Corrington; Michael B. Druxman; Gwyneth Gibby
- Produced by: Roger Corman
- Starring: Jennifer Burns; Winsome Brown; Joseph Hodge; David Carradine; Ashish Vidyarthi; Pradeep Rawat; Tony Mirrcandani; Sushant Kumar; Smita Hai; Varun Vardhan; Lalith Sharma
- Edited by: Robert E. Newton
- Music by: Brad Segal; Nic. tenBroek
- Release date: 2000
- Running time: 82 min.
- Country: United States
- Language: English

Nightfall is a 2000 American straight-to-video science-fiction thriller film directed by Gwyneth Gibby and loosely based on Isaac Asimov's short story of the same name. The film stars Jennifer Burns, Winsome Brown, Joseph Hodge, David Carradine and Ashish Vidyarthi in the lead roles.

== Cast ==
- Jennifer Burns as Illyra
- Winsome Brown as Sheerin
- Joseph Hodge as Metron
- David Carradine as Gnomen
- Ashish Vidyarthi as Kopton
- Pradeep Rawat as Django
- Tony Mirrcandani as Mecco
- Sushant Kumar
- Smita Hai
- Varun Vardhan
- Lalith Sharma

== Production ==
The film was shot in India.
