= Walraven =

Walraven is a Dutch given name and patronymic surname. The given name is first attested in 1294 and has the Germanic roots *wald- ("ruler") and *χraban- ("raven"). The German equivalent of the name is Walram. Variants are Walrave and Walravens. People with this name include:

== As a given name ==
- Walraven I van Brederode (c.1370–1417), Dutch nobility, Stadtholder of Holland 1416–1417
- Walraven of Moers (1393–1456), Dutch Roman Catholic bishop
- Walraven II van Brederode (1462–1531), Dutch nobility, council of Maximilian of Austria
- Walraven III van Brederode (1547–1614), Dutch noble and ambassador
- Walraven Robbert van Heeckeren van Brandsenburg (1776–1845), Dutch mayor of Utrecht
- Walraven van Hall (1906–1945), Dutch banker and World War II resistance leader

== As a surname ==
Walraven

- Isaac Walraven (1686–1765), Dutch painter, engraver and jeweler
- James Walraven (1949–2004), American murderer
- Jean Walraven (1926–2014), American hurdler
- Jeanne Beijerman-Walraven (1878–1969), Dutch composer
- Jook Walraven (born 1947), Dutch experimental physicist
- Nicole Walraven (born 1994), South African field hockey player
- Sharon Walraven (born 1970), Dutch wheelchair tennis player
- Willem Walraven (1887–1943), Dutch writer and journalist

Walrave

- Bruno Walrave (1939–2022), Dutch track cycle motor pacer

Walravens

- Carolus Gustavus Walravens (1841–1915), Belgian Roman Catholic bishop
- Hartmut Walravens (born 1944), German librarian
- Jean-Paul Walravens (born 1942), Belgian cartoonist, animator and film director known as "Picha"
- Gerard Walravens (c. 1900 – 1972), Belgian diplomat

== See also ==
- 1946 Walraven, main belt asteroid named after Dutch astronomer Theodore Fjeda Walraven (1916–2008)
- Walraven 2, Indonesian twin-engine plane designed by Laurens Walter Walraven (1898–1942)
