= William and Zachary Zulock =

American child rapists and sex offenders

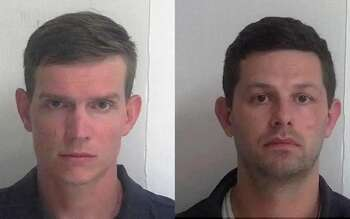
- William and Zachary Zulock's mugshots
- Born: William Dale Zulock; 1989 (age 36–37); Georgia, U.S. Zachary Jacoby Zulock; 1987 (age 38–39); Georgia, U.S.
- Occupations: Government employee (William); Bank worker (Zachary)
- Status: Incarcerated (both)
- Conviction: Guilty on all counts (both) (Note: Zachary pleaded not guilty to the two counts of incest. According to DA McGinley, Zachary's plea involved "purely legal issues." He was found guilty on both counts in bench trial proceedings.)
- Penalty: 100 years in prison without the possibility of parole, plus life on probation (both) (Note: The Georgia Department of Corrections does not list a possible release date for the Zulocks, instead stating that they are serving life sentences.)

Details
- Date apprehended: July 2022
- Imprisoned at: Jimmy Autry State Prison (William); Georgia Diagnostic and Classification State Prison (Zachary)

William Dale Zulock and Zachary Jacoby Zulock (born 1989 and 1987, respectively), are Americans convicted of child rape, who are presently serving a sentence of 100 years in prison without the possibility of parole for the repeated sexual abuse and exploitation of their two adoptive sons.

A wealthy couple involved in online LGBTQ activism, their case garnered significant attention from conservative media and some right-wing political commentators in the United States, as well as from President of Argentina Javier Milei, who mentioned the case at the 2025 World Economic Forum in Davos.

== Background ==
William and Zachary Zulock were born in 1989 and 1987, respectively.

Per The Telegraph, Zachary was said to have been a suspect in the rape of a 14-year-old boy following a police report in 2011, but charges were never brought.

After their marriage, the Zulocks became actively involved in online activism for LGBT rights, including adoption by same-sex couples and other campaigns and initiatives such as the NOH8 Campaign and others, while keeping a socially active and upper-class lifestyle. According to The Daily Wire, a conservative news website, the Zulocks had become visible online and alleged that LGBTQ magazine Out had asked them for permission to publish their story.

The Telegraph reported that in November 2018, they were living together and had an affluent lifestyle, with William working for the government and Zachary for a bank. The same month, when the Zulocks applied for adoption, they had residences in Loganville, Georgia, divided between Walton and Gwinnett County, plus another property in nearby Oxford in Newton County. The couple was granted the custody of two young boys – aged three and five – from a Christian special needs agency named All God's Children Inc., associated with the All God's Children Campaign. According to a website of private investigators, the adoption process was "unusually quick" for the Zulocks and it was not known whether the adoption agency had conducted background checks on each before granting them the custody of the children. The boys had been removed from their biological parents due to heroin addiction and were living in foster care when they were adopted by William and Zachary Zulock.

== Crimes and arrests ==
In 2019, after being granted custody of the boys, the Zulocks began sexually abusing the two children. They also engaged in the homemade production of child pornography and frequently procured the boys to two men in the area who would also abuse them.

Between 2019 and July 2022, the abuse continued, with Zachary contacting other pedophiles on Snapchat, where he posted boastful comments, as well as graphic details of his abuse. The two men who were indicted along with the Zulocks, Hunter Lawless and Luis Vizcarro-Sanchez, told Walton County police and the Georgia Bureau of Investigation (GBI) that the Zulocks had offered them the boys multiple times.

On July 22, 2022, the National Center for Missing & Exploited Children informed the GBI's crimes against children unit that they had tracked an IP address to Walton County where suspected child pornographic material had been uploaded to a Google account. Local police and the GBI conducted a search warrant on the house and arrested 27-year-old Hunter Lawless, who confessed to receiving the material from a man named Zach Zulock. Lawless also provided the GBI with chats between Zachary Zulock and him, in which Zachary told Lawless when he was going to rape the boys.

Police quickly arrested 25-year-old Luis Vizcarro-Sanchez, who was also accused of soliciting and consuming child sexual abuse material. That same evening of July 22, 2022, the Walton County Police Department and the GBI localized the Zulocks with the help of the Walton County School District, which provided information to identify the boys. Law enforcement agencies conducted a search warrant on the Zulocks's residence in Oxford, while child and family services took the two boys into protective custody.

== Legal proceedings ==
William and Zachary Zulock confessed to sexually abusing their two sons that same night. The GBI found extensive evidence of the abuses at the Zulocks's home, including a folder on Zachary's cell phone containing footage and pictures depicting sexual acts on the boys. Among the incriminating files was a video showing the Zulocks forcing the children to perform oral sex on them. Another series of images and videos included a sexual assault on the elder sibling, resulting in injury to his anus.

Law enforcement agencies and the district attorney's office gathered a total of 149 images, a text message from Lawless to the Zulocks, and a letter from the social app Snapchat as well as reports from a Sexual Assault Nurse Examiner who certified the abuses of the two boys.

Zachary told investigators that the abuse was "routine" but admitted that they had distributed the recorded material to up to a dozen people. The evidence included more than seven terabytes of photos and videos of child sexual abuse, with the newest material recorded 14 days before the couple's arrest.

Randy McGinley, the district attorney for the Alcovy Judicial District, which encompasses Walton and Newton County, charged the Zulocks with multiple crimes. Zachary was indicted on two counts of aggravated sodomy, three counts of aggravated child molestation, two counts of incest, two counts of sodomy, three counts of sexual exploitation of children, and two counts of pandering for a person under the age of 18. William was charged with six counts of aggravated sodomy, three counts of aggravated child molestation, two counts of incest, and two counts of sexual exploitation of children.

The DA office also filed charges against Lawless and Vizcarro-Sanchez for their involvement in the crimes. Lawless pled guilty to sexual exploitation of children and was sentenced to 20 years in prison, with the first 12 years to be served in prison. Vizcarro-Sanchez pled guilty to pandering for a person under the age of 18 and numerous counts of computer theft upon being discovered that he was stealing from his employer while he worked at a Kroger in Loganville. He was sentenced to 60 years in prison, with the first 15 years to be served in prison and on the condition that he testify in any legal proceeding against the Zulocks.

William Zulock did not face a trial and entered a guilty plea to all charges on August 20, 2024. Zachary pleaded not guilty to the two counts of incest, not contending the rest of the indictment. On October 21, after a bench trial, he was found guilty on both counts. Judge Jeffrey L. Foster subsequently set a sentencing hearing for the Zulocks for December 19, 2024.

That day, William and Zachary Zulock were sentenced to 100 years in prison each, followed by life on probation.

== Reactions and aftermath ==
Randy McGinley described the Zulocks's home as a "house of horrors,” additionally thanking law enforcement officials and social workers for their efforts to secure a conviction in the case. McGinley added that the officers involved in the case will "never forget what they had to see and hear." He called the Zulocks "selfish" individuals who "put their extremely dark desires above everything and everyone else" with a level of depravity "as deep as it gets". McGinley concluded his statement saying that the harsh punishments imposed on the Zulocks guarantees that the victims "will not have to worry as they grow older about their abusers being free".

The case against the Zulocks prompted interest in many U.S. conservatives and some others abroad, such as President of Argentina Javier Milei. In her primetime show, The Ingraham Angle, Fox News host Laura Ingraham gave explicit details about the Zulocks's crimes. Matt Walsh, another right-wing political commentator, said on X that the case was "not surprising," condemning same-sex adoption and calling the Zulocks "gut-wrenchingly disgusting and evil".

Internationally, President of Argentina Javier Milei mentioned the Zulocks's case at the 2025 World Economic Forum in Davos, suggesting that gay men were particularly prone to abusing children and calling "gender ideology" "plain and simply" pedophilia, along with other criticisms of feminism and transgender people in sports. Milei later denied comparing gay men to pedophiles, saying that he "lamented" that "they [gay men] let themselves be used by Party of the State's scumbags who edited the video". (Note: Milei's references to the Zulocks were made in the context of their crimes and their names were mentioned by media, not Milei.) Argentine media and society mostly reacted negatively to Milei's comments, with national deputy Maximiliano Ferraro of the Civic Coalition ARI condemned Milei for using “abhorrent cases" to attack the LGBTQ community. Journalist Ernesto Tenembaum argued on Infobae that the rhetoric against the LGBT community from Milei and the ruling La Libertad Avanza party, as well as Milei's association between gay men and pedophilia was "dangerous".

In February 2025, Argentines marched in the first anti-fascist protest against the government of Javier Milei and his remarks in Davos. Prominent gay Argentines, including from the fields of science, acting, entertainment, politics, and sports, condemned Milei and the usage of an isolated criminal case perpetrated by gay men to openly attack gays in general. The anti-fascism march took place for a second edition in February 2026, including broader meanings on its platform to protest Milei's economic policies, among other political causes.

== Analysis ==
Matt Gertz of Media Matters for America accused right-wing influential figures of gay bashing, asserting that these figures "continue to target same-sex couples who want to participate in traditionally conservative institutions like marriage and parenthood." Gertz wrote that right-wing commentators were "cynically leveraging" the Zulocks's crimes to reinforce opposition to same-sex adoption. He further described the Zulocks's actions as "appalling" but said that abuse by household members is "unnervingly common," especially among children who go through the foster care system.

Laura Ingraham interviewed Mia Cathell, a Townhall journalist who published an extensive multipart report about the case for the conservative website. Cathell expressed that the problem that the story showed was that "a same-sex couple was able to receive services" from an adoption agency.

In concluding his analysis, Gertz said that the "right's hateful anti-LGBTQ vitriol" and the "GOP's cruel legislative efforts in response" have focused on drag queens and transsexuals due to the historic civil rights advances by the gay community, adding that some reporters have suggested an increased support for gay, lesbian, and bisexual people among right-wing Americans and that the political focus has shifted to the trans community.

Argentine President Javier Milei's speech at Davos drew strong criticism and triggered anti-fascism protests in Argentina. Ernesto Tenembaum wrote on Infobae that Milei and his supporters were deliberately and falsely associating gay men with pedophiles, condemning pro-Milei commentator Agustín Laje for using homophobic rhetoric to describe the 2024 Summer Olympics opening ceremony in Paris and implied that gay men were "desperate to screw underage children." Tenembaum also asked readers what they believed that President Milei wanted Argentina to become, arguing that decisions against sexual minorities and women put into question the freedom preached by the government, concluding that the raising of some questions previously considered "absurd" in Argentina were "strikingly beginning to make sense."

== See also ==
- Mark J. Newton and Peter Truong, same-sex couple that also sexually abused their adopted children
