= USS Beagle (1822) =

History

United States
- Name: USS Beagle
- Acquired: 20 December 1822
- Commissioned: 1823
- Decommissioned: March 1825
- Fate: Sold

General characteristics
- Tonnage: 52 tons
- Propulsion: Sail
- Complement: 31
- Armament: 3 guns

USS Beagle was a schooner in the United States Navy during the 1820s. Beagle was purchased by the Navy on 20 December 1822 in Baltimore, Maryland, and commissioned early in 1823, Lieutenant John T. Newton in command.

On 15 February 1823, the schooner put to sea from Hampton Roads, Virginia, in company with Commodore David Porter's squadron, bound for the West Indies. Depredations inflicted on American shipping by pirates in the Caribbean constituted the reason this and other punitive expeditions were launched. The squadron arrived in the Virgin Islands at the island of St. Thomas on 3 March and soon thereafter began searching for pirates.

On 21 July, while Beagle and schooner Greyhound were reconnoitering Cape Cruz on the southern coast of Cuba, the commanding officers of both warships went ashore to investigate but found nothing on that side of the cape. Thereupon, they reembarked in their boat and pulled around to the other side of the promontory. When close to the shoreline, they came under fire that forced them to retreat around the cape to their ships.

The following day, Beagle and Greyhound rounded the cape and anchored within gunshot of the shoreline. One landing party went ashore to work around behind the pirates and cut off their retreat while another, supported by the guns of the two schooners, assaulted the pirates frontally. The pirates retreated, evaded the attempted encirclement, and escaped. The Americans located the pirates' base and destroyed it, carrying off the heavier weaponry. Beagle then resumed her patrols and continued to ply the waters of the West Indies until the autumn of 1823 when a severe outbreak of yellow fever forced her and several other ships of the squadron to return home for new crews.

Beagle returned to the West Indies sometime in 1824. Late in October, she was at St. Thomas when some pirates from Fajardo, Puerto Rico, stole about 5,000 dollars' worth of merchandise from an American-owned store. One of the store's owners requested Lt. Platt—then commanding Beagle—to help in recovering the goods. Platt agreed and quickly set Beagle's sails for Fajardo. Late that evening, the schooner entered the outer harbor at Fajardo and anchored for the night.

The next morning, 27 October 1824, Platt and a party of men from Beagle went ashore, in civilian garb, after having identified himself and his ship to local authorities. In a meeting with those same local authorities, he received assurances that the merchandise would be found and returned to its rightful owners. Satisfied that his mission was going well, Platt took his party to a public house for breakfast. At mid meal, summoned back to the mayor's office, Platt soon learned that the mood of the Spanish authorities had changed markedly. In response to the captain of the port's demand that he produce Beagle's register, he declared that a warship carried no register. Thereupon, the captain of the port stated that Platt would be imprisoned if he did not come up with one. Platt attempted to leave the office, but a detail of soldiers barred his way. Finally, the lieutenant succeeded in getting permission for one of his party to return to Beagle to retrieve his commission and uniform.

When the designated sailor returned, Platt donned his uniform and presented his commission. The Spanish authorities, however, pronounced the commission a forgery, denounced Platt as a pirate, and briefly imprisoned him in a filthy guardhouse. He was soon taken back to the mayor's office where the authorities granted him permission to send for his orders as Beagle's commanding officer. After examining Platt's orders, the Spaniards finally released him. Platt returned to Beagle and immediately set sail for St. Thomas to report this affront to the American flag and to the Navy to Commodore Porter.

On 12 November 1824, Porter reached St. Thomas in the frigate John Adams. Platt's report of the incident enraged the commodore, and he at once resolved to extract a public apology from the Spanish authorities. The next morning, Beagle headed back to Fajardo in company with John Adams and Grampus. Only Beagle and Grampus completed the short voyage as shallow water at the halfway point forced the commodore to complete the journey in Grampus and leave John Adams to await his return. The two smaller ships, reinforced by about 100 men from John Adams, arrived at Fajardo just after sunrise on 14 November. Porter then sent Lieutenant Cornelius Stribling and a small advance party under a flag of truce to deliver a letter to the Spanish authorities demanding a suitable public apology.

Later, Porter led the remainder of his large, well armed landing party inland toward the town. When he arrived near the town, he drew up his force and moved forward alone to confer with the officer in charge of an advance party of his marines. About 15 minutes later, Lt. Stribling appeared accompanied by Fajardo's mayor, the captain of the port, and several leading citizens. After some heated haggling in which the mayor indicated that he had been coerced by the pirates and factions favorable to them, he and the captain of the port finally made acceptable apologies to Lt. Platt. The commodore and his landing party returned to the beach, enjoyed some refreshments, and reembarked. He penned a report of the entire incident to the Secretary of the Navy. Confident that he had done his duty, Porter thought no more of it. Later, however, he would be recalled, court martialed, and suspended from the Navy for six months. Instead, Porter resigned his commission.

After the conclusion of the Fajardo incident, Beagle resumed her patrols against pirates.

On 24 November 1824 the French ship Calypso, Ducourmier, master, arrived at Key West with a full cargo of coffee. Pirates had captured Calypso as she was on her way to Havre from St Domingo. The pirates had killed half the crew; the rest had jumped overboard. The schooners Beagle and HMS Lion had recaptured Calypso, together with her pirate crew.

By the end of 1824, Beagle scoured the coast of Colombia searching for the seaborne predators on a cruise that lasted through the first two months of 1825. In March of that year, the schooner reentered Chesapeake Bay and sailed up the Potomac River to Washington, D.C. Upon arriving at the Washington Navy Yard, Beagle was decommissioned, and she was sold soon thereafter.

== See also ==
- List of historical schooners
