= Jack Newton (disambiguation) =

Jack Newton (1950–2022) was an Australian golfer.

Jack Newton may also refer to:

- Jack Newton (Toronto politician), Toronto politician
- Jack B. Newton (1942-2025), Canadian astronomer
- John Verdun Newton (1916–1944), military aviator and politician in Western Australia
- Jack Newton (footballer) (born 1952), Australian rules footballer

== See also ==
- John Newton (disambiguation)
