= "All God's Children" Campaign =

LGBTQ activism campaign

The "All God's Children" Campaign is an effort by the Human Rights Campaign (HRC) to challenge religious opposition to the legalization of same-sex marriage and promote LGBTQ acceptance in the Southern United States. According to the HRC, the program was designed to "change hearts and minds, improve the public perception and overall awareness of LGBT people, begin to reduce the painful stigma that many face in their daily lives, and help future efforts to enact pro-equality legislation." The program targeted Mississippi, Alabama, and Arkansas – all states that had no form of housing, employment, or marriage protections for LGBT citizens.

== Background ==
The Southern United States is far more culturally conservative than the North. In the early 2000s, while northern states began legalizing same-sex marriage, many southern states were passing laws banning it. However, southern support as a whole rose an entire 26 percentage points from 2003 to 2013, leaving the south split on the issue of same-sex marriage. Scholars suggested that some of the factors leading to this cultural change include generational differences, the "friends and family effect," and a new appreciation for the separation of church and state. Approximately 64% of Southerners can say that they know someone who is gay or lesbian, a factor that is considered crucial for support of legislation such as same-sex marriage.

The South also holds the lowest regional social climate index ranking for the LGBTQ community in the United States, with a score of 55. Same-sex couples with kids have a household income that averages about $11,000 lower than heterosexual couples. Gay and bisexual men in the south hold higher HIV infection rates than those in other parts of the country; additionally, only 75% of southern LGBT people are covered by health insurance. "Discomfort" with exposure to LGBTQ lifestyles, such as attending a same-sex wedding or seeing pictures of a coworker with a same-sex partner, polls about 5-10 percentage points higher in the South than in northern states.

Additionally, the chosen states are heavily religious; for example, more than half of Mississippi residents are members of the southern Baptist church. Because of this, the Human Rights Campaign refers to Mississippi, their target audience for the early stages of the All God's Children campaign, as being "the most religious state in America." Mississippi also has no statewide protects for LGBTQ people and, in 2014, passed a law allowing businesses to refuse services to LGBTQ people.

== Strategy ==
The "All God's Children" project included phone banking, TV commercials, banner ads, and "direct-mail" messages. The ad campaign featured testimonies from Christian parents of LGBTQ children, gay army veterans, and transgender students to appeal towards the religious community. The Mississippi campaign itself was expected to cost approximately $310,000, out of a total of $8.5 million including Alabama and Arkansas over the course of three years. The first television commercials aired in November 2014 in Mississippi, two days before a federal court hearing on a state law banning same-sex marriage.

== Response ==
The American Family Association of Mississippi issued a retaliatory statement in November [2014] arguing that the "[normalization of] homosexuality in the southern states" would not be acceptable to their program. Others argued that the campaign wouldn't be enough to change the hearts of "biblically literate Christians." Southern Protestants, especially those in the Southern Baptist Convention, have been alleged to be the most vehemently opposed to the expansion of LGBTQ protections in the south.

One of the campaign's affiliates in Walton County, Georgia, came under heavy criticism from right-wing political commentators for having granted the custody of two boys to William and Zachary Zulock, a gay couple who, between 2019 and July 2022, repeatedly abused both children. Some of the commentators, including Charlie Kirk and Laura Ingraham, unfoundedly associated same-sex adoption with the Zulocks's crimes.
