= Frances Newton (disambiguation) =

Frances Newton was executed in Texas in 2005 for the 1987 triple murder of her family.

Frances Newton may also refer to:

- Frances E. Newton (1871–1955), English missionary who lived in Palestine until 1938
- Frances Newton, Baroness Cobham (1539–1592), second wife of William Brooke, 10th Baron Cobham
- Frances Newton (educator) (1865–?), American early childhood educator
- Frances Newton, the pen name of Canadian writer Muriel Denison

== See also ==
- Francis Newton (disambiguation)
