= James Walraven =

American murderer (1949–2004)

James Samuel Walraven
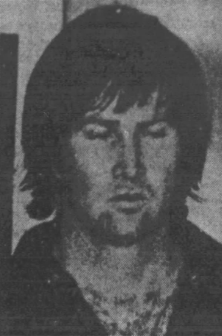
- Walraven shortly after his arrest
- Born: May 11, 1949; Macon, Georgia, U.S.
- Died: April 16, 2004 (aged 54); Jimmy Autry State Prison, Pelham, Georgia, U.S.
- Cause of death: Suicide by hanging
- Other name: "The Bathtub Strangler"
- Conviction: Murder
- Penalty: Death; commuted to life imprisonment

Details
- Victims: 1–3
- Span of crimes: April – June 1981
- Country: United States
- State: Georgia
- Date apprehended: July 14, 1981

James Samuel Walraven (May 11, 1949 – April 16, 2004), nicknamed The Bathtub Strangler, was an American murderer and suspected serial killer from Georgia who murdered 22-year-old Giselle Clardy in 1981 and was the prime suspect in two similar murders of women in their apartments. He was convicted and sentenced to die in the electric chair, which was later commuted to a life sentence. Walraven killed himself in prison in 2004.

== Early life ==
James Walraven was born in Macon, Georgia, in 1949. He was reported to have been a withdrawn but well-behaved child who developed emotional problems in his junior year of high school. Walraven's mother testified that his father was an alcoholic who was abusive towards her and their children, leading them to divorce. In adulthood, Walraven was unemployed and frequented public tennis courts in Atlanta and DeKalb County. He had been committed to mental institutions numerous times and told doctors and strangers that he had felt inadequate with women. Walraven was arrested in June 1980 after pointing a gun at his tennis acquaintance, Jeff Campbell, who later described Walraven as a moody and unstable person.

== Murders ==
On April 15, 1981, police discovered 22-year-old Louise DalSanto strangled, lying face down in her bathtub at Woodcreek Apartments in Clarkston. On May 29, in Brookhaven, 22-year-old Giselle Yvonne Clardy was found murdered in her bathtub at Cherry Hill Apartments, where she was an assistant manager. Both DalSanto and Clardy appeared to have been raped before their murders. Patricia Berry, also aged 22, was found dead in her bathtub on June 15 at Windermere Apartments in Fulton County, strangled with her own hair ribbon.

== Investigation, trial and conviction ==
Due to the similarities between the murders, law enforcement began investigating recent police reports for possible leads. One report from March 3 by Margaret Finnerty, another resident of Windermere Apartments, described a man entering her apartment under the guise of fixing pipes and, upon entering, strangling her until she was unconscious. The apartment was ransacked, but only a World War II bayonet was stolen. Another report from March 16 by Constance Harold described a man dressed as a floral deliveryman outside her apartment. When she opened the door, he attempted to force his way in, though she managed to slam the door shut and call the police.

Law enforcement connected these two incidents to the murders and developed a composite sketch of the suspect from the two women and other witnesses in the apartment complex. They later received a tip, which led them to 32-year-old James Samuel Walraven, an unemployed man who frequented local tennis courts. On July 14, he was arrested and held in the DeKalb County Jail. During interrogation, he told officers that "the only person he had ever had sex with in his life was his sister".

His trial took place in November 1981. David Zorda, a forger who was incarcerated in the DeKalb County Jail at the time, testified that Walraven had told him that he "killed those goddamn bitches". A mechanic named James Buffington testified that he witnessed Walraven speaking briefly to Clardy in the parking lot of Cherry Hill Apartments shortly before her murder. Additionally, Finnerty and Harold both identified Walraven as the man who had attacked them at their apartments in March. Walraven's defense attorney, Richard M. Loftis, contended that there were no fingerprints or other physical evidence to connect Walraven to the crimes. The DeKalb County jury returned its verdict of guilty on November 16, and Walraven was sentenced to death.

A motion was later filed, and due to the statement Walraven gave to Zorda not taking place in custodial interrogation, a retrial was scheduled, and he was sentenced to life imprisonment in 1983.

On April 16, 2004, Walraven committed suicide by hanging himself with a torn bed sheet in Jimmy Autry State Prison.

== See also ==
- List of serial killers in the United States
