= Edward Newton (disambiguation) =

Edward Newton (1832–1897) was a British colonial administrator and ornithologist.

Edward Newton may also refer to:

- A. Edward Newton (1863–1940), American author and bibliophile
- Edward Newton (cricketer) (1871–1906), English cricketer
- Eddie Newton (born 1971), English footballer
- Eddie Newton (EastEnders)

== See also ==
- Ted Newton, character in Beethoven films
- Teddy Newton (born 1964), artist
- Edwin Tulley Newton (1840–1930), English palaeontologist
