= 5th Arkansas Cavalry Regiment =

- Active: 1863–1865
- Disbanded: May 26, 1865
- Country: Confederate States
- Allegiance: Arkansas
- Branch: Army
- Type: Cavalry
- Size: Regiment

The 5th Arkansas Cavalry Regiment (1863–1865) was a Confederate Army cavalry regiment during the American Civil War. The regiment was designated at various times as Newton's Regiment Arkansas Cavalry, Morgan's Regiment Arkansas Cavalry, 2nd Regiment Arkansas Cavalry, and the 8th Regiment Arkansas Cavalry. This regiment should not be confused with a later regiment commanded by Col. Robert Crittenden Newton, which was a regiment of Arkansas State Troops usually referred to as Newton's 10th Arkansas Cavalry Regiment.

== Organization ==
Organized with 12 companies at Little Rock, Arkansas in April, 1863 under the command of Colonel Robert C. Newton. The unit was composed of companies from the following counties:

- Company A – Van Buren County and Jackson County; enlisted June 24, 1862, at Clinton, Arkansas.
- Company B – Jefferson County; enlisted February 10, 1863, at Pine Bluff, Arkansas.
- Company C – Independence County; enlisted January 10, 1863, at Pleasant Plains, Arkansas.
- Company D – Lawrence County; enlisted November 1, 1862, at Evening Shade, Arkansas.
- Company E - Conway County; enlisted December 24, 1862, in Conway county, Arkansas.
- Company F – Independence County; enlisted January 9, 1863, at Hess Ferry, Arkansas.
- Company G – Fulton county, Arkansas, enlisted December 12, 1862, also known as Capt. Lorenzo Dow Bryant's mounted company, which also included some Missourians from near by Howell and Oregon counties. The company was organized in December 1862 and was attached to the 4th Missouri Cavalry as (old) Co. I until April 1863, when it was detached and assigned to the 5th Arkansas Cavalry as Company G.
- Company H – Independence County and Izard County enlisted December 15, 1862.
- Company I - Mississippi County; enlisted March 16, 1863, at Camp Wilson, Arkansas.
- Company K – Van Buren County; enlisted March 4, 1863, at Clinton, Arkansas.
- Company L – Van Buren County; enlisted December 26, 1862, at Kenyon, Arkansas.

The regiment went by a variety of unofficial names during its existence. When Colonel Robert Crittenden Newton was in command, it went by its official title of 5th Arkansas Cavalry. Colonel Newton was succeeded in December 1863 by Col. Thomas J. Morgan, formerly captain of Company C. Under Colonel Morgan's command, the regiment went by the designation 8th Arkansas Cavalry; but it was also known on occasion as the 2nd Arkansas Cavalry. The Compiled Service Records are filed under the designation 8th Arkansas Cavalry. The commanders of the 5th/2nd/8th Cavalry include Colonels Robert C. Newton, Thomas J. Morgan, and W. A. Bevens.

== Battles ==
As the 5th Arkansas under Colonel Newton, the unit served in General J. G. Walker's (later Dobbins') Division, Trans-Mississippi Department, and fought in the following engagements:

- Battle of Helena, Arkansas, July 4, 1863.
- Battle of Brownsville, Arkansas, August 25, 1863
- Battle of Reed's Bridge, Arkansas, August 27, 1863
- Battle of Bayou Fourche, Arkansas, September 10, 1863.
- Battle of Pine Bluff, Arkansas, October 25, 1863.

The unit had several members captured in the Battle of Bayou Fourche (Little Rock) in September 1863. These prisoners were sent to Camp Morton, near Indianapolis, Indiana. A few died in prison, a few joined the U.S. Army frontier service, but most were exchanged in March 1864. Many of these men were back in Arkansas in time to be paroled at Jacksonport, Arkansas, on June 5, 1865, at the end of the war.

The unit designation changed to the 2nd (Morgan's) Cavalry Regiment effective December 24, 1863. As the 8th/2nd Arkansas under Colonel Morgan, the unit served in General Cabell's Brigade, Trans-Mississippi Department, and fought in the following engagements:

- Battle of Poison Spring, Arkansas, April 18, 1864.
- Battle of Marks' Mills, Arkansas, April 25, 1864. The regiment lost 18 percent of the 130 engaged.
- Price's Missouri Raid, Arkansas-Missouri-Kansas, September–October, 1864

Battle of Fort Davidson, Missouri, September 27, 1864
Fourth Battle of Boonville, Missouri, October 11, 1864
Battle of Glasgow, Missouri, October 15, 1864
Battle of Sedalia, Missouri, October 15, 1864
Second Battle of Lexington, Missouri, October 19, 1864
Battle of Little Blue River, Missouri, October 21, 1864
Second Battle of Independence, Missouri, October 21–22, 1864
Battle of Byram's Ford, Missouri, October 22–23, 1864
Battle of Westport, Missouri, October 23, 1864
Battle of Marais des Cygnes, Linn County, Kansas, October 25, 1864
Battle of Mine Creek, Missouri, October 25, 1864
Battle of Marmiton River, Missouri, October 25, 1864
Second Battle of Newtonia, Missouri, October 28, 1864

== Surrender ==
This regiment actually disbanded prior to the formal surrendered and the men were paroled at various places, but primarily at Jacksonport, Arkansas.

== Bibliography ==
Bears, Edwin C. “The Battle of Helena, July 4, 1863.” Arkansas Historical Quarterly 20 (Autumn 1961): 256–297.

Christ, Mark K. Civil War Arkansas, 1863: The Battle for a State. Norman: University of Oklahoma Press, 2010.

Christ, Mark K., ed. Rugged and Sublime: The Civil War in Arkansas. Fayetteville: University of Arkansas Press, 1994.

Christ, Mark K. “‘We Were Badly Whipped’: A Confederate Account of the Battle of Helena, July 4, 1863.” Arkansas Historical Quarterly 69 (Spring 2010): 44–53.

Schieffler, George David. “Too Little, Too Late to Save Vicksburg: The Battle of Helena, Arkansas, July 4, 1863.” MA thesis, University of Arkansas, 2005

== See also ==
- List of Confederate units from Arkansas
- Confederate Units by State
