= Edith Eleanor Newton =

British missionary

Edith Eleanor Newton (January 1860 - April 1926) was a British missionary part of the Church Missionary Society (CMS). She lived and worked in Palestine from October 1887 to October 1893 along with both of her sisters and fellow missionaries, Frances E. Newton and Constance A. Newton.

Edith Eleanor Newton's work primarily involved religious missionary work along with education to both adults and children in Palestine. She is known to have been responsible for the running and maintenance of several schools, hospitals and, missions throughout her career. Prior to her work in Palestine, Newton was heavily involved in volunteer work in Jaffna, Sri Lanka.

Edith Eleanor Newton was known to have been involved with the Jaffa Mission during her time in Palestine and has been honored for her work and contributions there. She was one of the very few and first women to have volunteered their services towards the Jaffa Mission during that time period.

== Family and personal life ==
Edith Eleanor Newton was the daughter of Anne Rosamond and Charles E. Newton. Newton was baptised on 31 January 1860. Her family lived at The Manor in Mickleover, Derbyshire in the United Kingdom and was known to have numerous servants, tutors and groundsmen. Her father, Charles E. Newton was the Justice of the Peace to the county and borough of Derby, a banker and a prominent farmer with many employees and laborers. He also remarried a Maltese woman Mary Henrietta Moore, of which little is known.

Newton had several siblings including Rosamond C. Newton, Mary L. Newton, Frances E. Newton, Margaret E. Newton, Constance A. Newton and, Francis C. Newton. Both of her sisters, Frances E. Newton and Constance A. Newton served in Palestine as religious missionaries alongside Edith. Frances is known for her roles in activism and politics in Palestine during her time there. Constance was known for being the director of the Jaffa Mission Hospital.

Up until age 27, Edith worked as a voluntary helper in Jaffna, Sri Lanka before being accepted to become a religious missionary in Palestine where she would later join her sister Constance. Frances joined them later on in 1895.

== Missionary Work ==
Edith Eleanor Newton was among the first few people to respond to the call made by Rev. John Robert Longley Hall for approximately ten missionaries to go to Palestine in light of the ecclesiastical difficulties in Palestine at that time. John Robert Longley Hall was a Chaplain and was invited to England when the Archbishop of Canterbury assigned him the duty of finding missionaries to help with the situation in Palestine. Newton, together with two other women on record, Eliza Armstrong and Annie S. H. Vidal were the first to respond to this appeal made by Hall.

Newton was accepted as an Honorary Missionary of the Church Missionary Society (CMS) on 4 October 1887 and went to Jaffa on 20 October 1887 to begin her mission. While there, she was the Sister Head of the Medical Mission Hospital. Over the time period of 1887 to 1893, Newton traveled back and forth between England and Palestine very frequently. Her regular travel was due to visiting her sister, Constance who had contracted an illness that proved to be fatal and had to leave her missionary work in Jaffa and return to England.

The Jaffa Mission Hospital was owned and operated by Mildmay Missions, an organisation which worked in conjunction with the Church Missionary Society (CMS). Constance together with another missionary, Miss Mangan were responsible for running the facility with the help of a Syrian physician Dr. Keith Ghoreyeb. After Miss Mangan's death in 1885, the hospital was rebuilt into a functional medical facility. In 1892, Mildmay Missions bequeathed the Jaffa Mission Hospital to Constance Newton and Edith Eleanor Newton for full ownership and operation. After Constance became ill, the hospital was run by Edith and Dr. Ghoreyeb. Following her death on 19 August 1908, Constance left behind an endowment of £10,000 for the running of the hospital.

At the Jaffa Mission Hospital, aside from its medical practices, every day half-hour services were held in both the men's and women's wards for inpatients. During these services, the patients were allowed to participate in gospel singing as well as scripture readings. In addition to this, every day before the patients see the doctor, they also have a short gospel service. Edith was responsible for coordinating these events as well as conducting her own Women's Service every Thursday afternoon. One of the most prominent issues faced by the hospital at the time was infant mortality. Edith's service was specifically tailored to the mothers' rehabilitation and spiritual enlightenment. Newton frequently sang to the women, engaged in prayer, carried them to her garden and showed them lantern slides. Edith was not only involved in the capacity of being a missionary but was also involved in donating various resources to the hospital over the years leading to its overall development and improvement.

In addition to the Jaffa Mission Hospital, there was also an outpatient clinic at Lod (previously Lydd) which was operated by the Church Missionary Society (CMS). During war activities, part of the building was destroyed by fire but was rebuilt to accommodate the needs of the patients. In order for work to be carried out efficiently at this site, two persons were required to be there each day to carry out duties in between doctor's visits however, just train rides and walking were very time consuming. As such, Edith donated a Ford car to transport individuals between the hospital in Jaffa and outpatient clinic in Lod. The car served to transport the local reverend back and forth as well as an ambulance to transport critically ill patients. In some cases, the car would be used to visit surrounding villages to find and treat persons who were ill.

== Edith's Letters ==
During her time as a missionary in Palestine, Newton would frequently write letters and literary pieces to the Church Missionary Society's range of publications including the Church Missionary Gleaner, Church Missionary Intelligencer, Mercy and Truth and, The CMS Home Gazette. These publications served to give readers in the outside world insight as to what was going on politically, economically, religiously and medically in countries other than their own which CMS sent to be missionaries. These publications served as a medium through which missionaries could relay their thoughts and experiences to the mass public of their journeys and their purpose being there.

Newton's earliest letters began as soon as she arrived in Palestine and detailed her life in concise paragraphs almost on a monthly basis. The contents of these letters basically conveyed what was going on in her life at the current time as well as challenges such as sickness, community adjustment, struggles in learning Arabic together with a snapshot of what her role was at the time.

As far as her literary work is concerned, she published an article titled, "A Story of a Russian Pilgrim."This article takes the form of a story which Newton recalls from her own experience. It essentially involves a Russian woman brought in to be treated at the Jaffa Mission Hospital and was not able to communicate with anyone as their languages differed. Newton further goes on to say that the woman, after her medical procedure, would often engage with other members of the hospital in singing hymns and the only word which she learned was 'Hallelujah'. According to Newton, singing and praying made the Russian woman feel great joy and happiness in a place where she knew no one, could not communicate effectively and was being treated medically.

== Death ==
Edith Eleanor Newton died on 6 April 1926. She was buried at St. Bartholomew's Church located in Haslemere Parish, Surrey, England on 9 April 1926. Prior to her death in 1926, Edith was named as an Honorary Life Member of the Church Mission Society (CMS) in 1916 for her outstanding service and invaluable work throughout her career as a missionary.
