= John Newton (disambiguation) =

John Newton (1725–1807) was an English slave ship master and Anglican clergyman, author of "Amazing Grace".

John Newton may also refer to:

== Military ==
- John Newton (engineer) (1823–1895), U.S. Army engineer and Civil War general
- John Newton (soldier) (1755–1780), American Revolution soldier, fictionalized as a hero
- John H. Newton (1881–1948), American admiral
- John T. Newton (1793–1857), American naval officer
- John Newton (Canadian admiral) (born c. 1959), Royal Canadian Navy officer

== Politicians ==
- Sir John Newton, 2nd Baronet (1626–1699), English politician
- John Newton (MP for Bristol) see Bristol 1407
- John Newton (MP for Derby), see Derby 1473
- John Newton (MP for Stafford), see Stafford (1388–1391)
- John Newton (Nova Scotia politician) (1727–1811), surveyor and politician in Nova Scotia
- John Verdun Newton (1916–1944), military aviator and politician in Western Australia
- John Orville Newton (1864-1958), state representative in Maine

== Sportsmen ==
- John Newton (bowls), Paralympic lawn bowler from Australia
- John Newton (rugby league) (1920–1991), New Zealand rugby league player

== Others ==
- John Newton (actor) (born 1965), American actor
- John A. Newton (1930–2017), president of the Methodist Conference, president of the Wesley Historical Society
- John Newton (trade unionist) (1908–1993), British trade unionist
- John B. Newton (1839–1897), Episcopal bishop in Virginia, USA
- John E. Newton (judge) (1904–1984), Justice of the Nebraska Supreme Court
- John Newton (epidemiologist) (born 1959), UK public health expert
- John Newton (poet) (born 1959), New Zealand poet
- John Frank Newton (1767–1837), British vegetarianism activist and Zoroastrian
- John Gubbins Newton, subject of the 1833 painting John Gubbins Newton and His Sister, Mary Newton

== See also ==
- Jack Newton (disambiguation)
