= Mike Newton =

Mike Newton may refer to:

- Mike Newton (racing driver) (born 1960), British businessman and racing driver
- Mike Newton (American football) (born 1987), American football defensive back
- Harold Newton (cricketer) (1918–2007), known as Mike, English cricketer
- Mike Newton (Twilight)

== See also ==
- Michael Newton (disambiguation)
