= Francis Newton =

Francis Newton may also refer to:

- Francis Newton (golfer) (1874–1946), American golfer
- Francis Newton (priest) (died 1572), English clergyman and Dean of Winchester Cathedral
- Francis Milner Newton (1720–1794), English portrait painter and first secretary of the Royal Academy
- Francis James Newton (1857–1948), British colonial administrator
- Francis Newton, occasional pen name of British historian Eric Hobsbawm

== See also ==
- Frank Newton (disambiguation)
- Frances Newton (disambiguation)
