= Albert Newton =

Albert Newton is the name of:

- Albert Newton (footballer) (born 1894), English footballer
- Bert Newton (born 1938), Australian media personality
- Albert Newton (bowls), Australian lawn bowler
