= Robert C. Newton =

13th governor of Arkansas

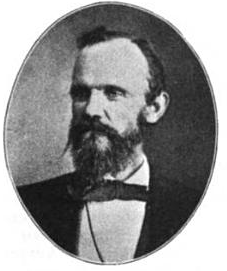

15th Treasurer of Arkansas
- In office May 1874 – November 1874
- Governor: Elisha Baxter
- Preceded by: Henry Page
- Succeeded by: T. C. Churchill

Member of the Arkansas House of Representatives from the Pulaski County district
- In office November 5, 1866 – April 2, 1868
- Preceded by: Thomas Fletcher
- Succeeded by: redistricted

Personal details
- Born: June 2, 1840 Little Rock, Arkansas
- Died: June 7, 1877 (aged 37) Little Rock, Arkansas
- Resting place: Calvary Cemetery; Little Rock, Arkansas
- Spouse: Cassandra Reider
- Relations: John Allen (grandfather); John T. Newton (uncle)
- Parent: Thomas W. Newton (father)
- Education: Western Military Institute
- Profession: Lawyer
- Known for: Brooks-Baxter War

Military service
- Allegiance: Confederate States
- Branch/service: Confederate States Army
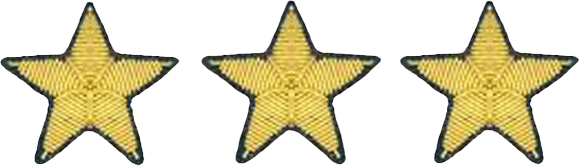
- Rank: Colonel

Robert Crittenden Newton (June 2, 1840 – June 7, 1877) was a lawyer, politician, and Confederate Colonel in Arkansas during the American Civil War. He is most remembered for his involvement in the Brooks-Baxter War. Robert C. Newton Camp # 197 of Little Rock was named for him and was the oldest continually run camp of the Arkansas Division, Sons of Confederate Veterans, as well as the oldest continually active camp west of the Mississippi River.

== Early life and education ==
Born in Little Rock, Arkansas, son of Thomas W. Newton and Eliza Allen Newton. His father had been a state legislator and a representative in the 28th Congress. Newton was also the grandson of Col. John Allen, who was killed leading his “Bark” at the Battle of River Rasin, January 22, 1813.

Newton was educated at the Western Military Institute in White House, Tennessee. He studied at the University of Nashville, in Nashville, Tennessee, and studied mathematics and languages with a private tutor. He was admitted to the bar in 1862 and practiced law in Little Rock.

== American Civil War ==
He joined the Confederate army as a private in 1861 and was promoted lieutenant and assistant adjutant-general on the staff of Thomas C. Hindman. He took part in the battles of Woodsonville, Shiloh, Siege of Corinth, Prairie Grove, Helana, Little Rock, and Jenkin's Ferry. He was regularly promoted, becoming colonel of the 5th Arkansas Cavalry Regiment, and was acting brigadier general in command of the Arkansas state troops at the close of the war. He was a commissioner from Arkansas to authorities at Washington in 1866 to secure representation for the state in congress.

== Brooks–Baxter War ==
Newton arrested Elisha Baxter for treason during the American Civil War and brought him to Little Rock, the state capital. After the war, when Baxter was governor, he appointed Newton Major General in charge of the Arkansas State Militia. During the coup by Joseph Brooks known as the Brooks-Baxter War, Newton was the commander of the Baxter militia. After the war, Baxter appointed Newton as state treasurer.
