= Joseph Newton =

Joseph or Joe Newton may refer to:

- Joseph Fort Newton (1876–1950), American Baptist minister
- Joe Newton (coach) (1929–2017), high school coach of The Long Green Line cross country team
- Joseph Newton (cricketer) (born 1950), Barbadian cricketer
- Joe Newton, drummer for Gas Huffer, now deputy art director for Rolling Stone magazine
- Joe Newton, character in Alias John Preston
- Joey Newton (born 1977), Australian America's Cup sailor
- Joe Newton (footballer) (born 2001), English footballer, (Solihull Moors, Boreham Wood), see 2024–25 Rochdale A.F.C. season
