= James P. Newton =

African American photographer

James P. Newton was a photographer in Memphis, Tennessee. He is noted as the city's first African American professional photographer and as an influential documenter of the city's history. Several of his cabinet card photographs remain including in the University of Memphis' collection.

Newton owned property in Chicago and partnered with his brother Charles to form Newton & Newton. He also worked for a larger studio during his career.

He featured in Sprakling Gems of Race Knowledge Worth Knowing (1897), along with a portrait of him. G. P. Hamilton wrote about him in The Bright Side of Memphis (1908).

He had a studio on 134 South Main and then Beale Street. The Memphis Heritage Trail includes a site related to him.
