= Christopher Newton (disambiguation) =

Christopher Newton may refer to:

- Christopher Newton (born 1936), Canadian director and actor
- Chris Newton (born 1973), British cyclist
- Christopher Newton (criminal) (1969–2007), American murderer
