= James Newton (footballer) =

English footballer

Personal information
- Date of birth: 1898
- Place of birth: Horsforth, England
- Position: Goalkeeper

Senior career*
Years	Team	Apps	(Gls)
- Anderston Victoria
- Glasgow Perthshire
- Rutherglen Glencairn
1921–1923	Queen's Park	69	(0)
1923–1925	Bradford City	5	(0)
- Halifax Town
- Coventry City
- Brighton & Hove Albion
- Otley
- Burley Grove United
Total		74	(0)
- * Club domestic league appearances and goals

James I. Newton, known as Jimmy Newton and Jack Newton (born 1898) was an English professional footballer who played as a goalkeeper.

== Career ==
Born in Horsforth, Newton spent his early career with Anderston Victoria, Glasgow Perthshire, and Rutherglen Glencairn. He then played for Queen's Park between 1921 and 1923. He joined Bradford City in June 1923, making 5 league appearances for the club. He left the club in May 1924 to sign for Halifax Town. He later played for Coventry City, Brighton & Hove Albion, Otley and Burley Grove United.

== Sources ==
- Frost, Terry (1988). Bradford City: A Complete Record, 1903-1988. Breedon Books Sport. ISBN 0-907969-38-0.
