= Sydney Newton =

English photographer

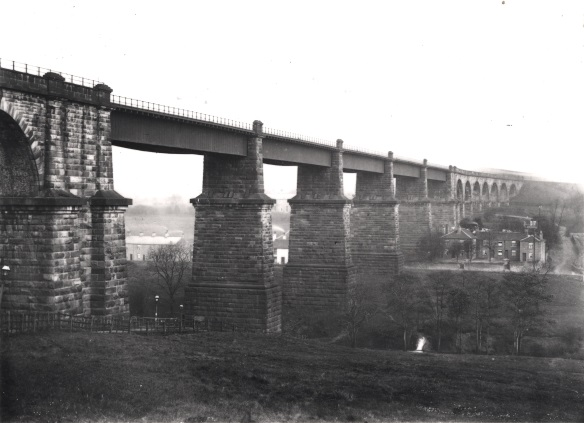
The brick and girder viaduct that carried the Great Central Railway across the valley at Dinting, Derbyshire. 18 May 1903

Sydney Walter Alfred Newton (1875 – 1960) was an English photographer based in Leicester.

== Life ==
He was born on 27 June 1875 in Leicester, the eldest son of Alfred Newton (1852-1929) and Elizabeth (Betsy) Newton (1853-1915). He was baptised on 15 Aug 1875 in St Matthew's Church, Leicester.

He married Winifred Edith Hodges (1886-1961) on 8 March 1915. He became a father when he was 45, his son being born on 24 August 1919 and taking his name.

Later moving to live with his son, a schoolmaster, he died at the age of 85 years, on 24 January 1960, at Beverley, East Yorkshire. He left an estate valued at £1,257 (equivalent to £40,000 in 2023).

== Career ==
His father, Alfred, ran a photographic business at 19 Belvoir Street and the family lived above the shop. After a fire in an adjacent factory, the Newton family and business relocated to 17 King Street, Leicester.

Alfred Newton and Son was the official photographer to Leicester Museum, recording and documenting many objects and artefacts.

Sydney Newton joined the family firm in the early 1890s. When the work on the Great Central Railway (GCR) began in 1894, Sydney recorded the work in progress. He was not an official photographer for the GCR but created a photographic archive out of his own enthusiasm for the work. He recorded the London Extension of the GCR as the work progressed, capturing every aspect of its creation. Newton also took photographs of the ‘navvies’ working on the construction, as well as the construction itself.

For many years he lived at 336 Victoria Park Road, Leicester in a house that he named ‘Finmere’ after one of the stations on the London Extension.

Sydney Newton remained in photography for the rest of his life and the business stayed in King Street until around 1950. After he sold the King Street shop he moved to a smaller house at Branting Hill in Groby, Leics.

The public English Heritage Archive holds 3926 glass negatives taken by Alfred Newton and Son. Two thirds of these photographs relate to the Great Central Railway.
