= Henry Newton =

Henry Newton may refer to:

- Henry Newton (MP for Wells) (c. 1531–1599), English politician
- Sir Henry Puckering, 3rd Baronet (1618–1701), previously Sir Henry Newton, English royalist and politician
- Henry Newton (Canadian politician) (1731–1802), Member of the Nova Scotia House of Assembly, 1758–1760
- Henry Newton (footballer) (1944–2026), English footballer
- Henry Chance Newton (1854–1931), author and theatre critic
- Henry Newton (bishop) (1866–1947), Anglican colonial bishop
- Henry Newton (diplomat) (1651–1715), British envoy to Tuscany, 1704–1711
- Henry Newton (Coronation Street), a fictional character in the British soap opera

== See also ==
- Henry Newton Brown (1857–1884), American lawman and outlaw of the old west
- Henry Newton Brown Jr. (born 1941), Louisiana appellate judge, legal lecturer, and former district attorney.
- Harry Newton (disambiguation)
