= Jimmy Autry State Prison =

Prison in Georgia, United States

Coordinates: 31°11′22″N 84°08′42″W

- Interactive map of Jimmy Autry State Prison
- Location: 3178 Mt Zion Church Road Pelham, Georgia
- Status: open
- Security class: medium
- Capacity: 1698
- Opened: 1993
- Managed by: Georgia Department of Corrections

Jimmy Autry State Prison is a state prison located in Mitchell County, near Pelham, Georgia. It was constructed in 1992 and opened in 1993.

Autry houses close security inmates who, due to their offense or behavior, would not be safe in the general prison population. Sex offender treatment is compulsory. Various religious activities are offered and are well attended. Vocational options consist of Footwear Manufacturing, Buffer Repair, and Food Preparation. The prison compound consists of eight buildings. Six buildings maintain two cell units which have 48 double-bunked beds in each. Building seven has four living areas with 92 beds in each. The last building holds one dorm with 85 double-dunks and a segregation hall of 47 beds.

Autry state prison, as of 2020, offers two programs for inmate recreation. These include a Bee Keeping program and an Art Workshop. Due to lack of adequate security inmates are not currently able to fully participate in all of the camp's programs.

Autry was one of nine Georgia state prisons implicated in an FBI sting operation announced in February 2016. The agency indicted 47 correction officers who'd agreed to deliver illegal drugs while in uniform. These charges were "part of a larger public corruption investigation into Georgia Correctional Facilities".

== Notable Inmates ==
- Nicholas Kassotis
- William Zulock
- Silento - former rapper who was convicted of voluntary manslaughter after shooting and killing his cousin,sentenced to 30 years.
