= Ben Newton =

Ben Newton may refer to:

- Ben Newton (wheelchair rugby) (born 1988), Australian Paralympian
- Ben Newton (footballer, born 1934), English footballer (Grimsby Town)
- Ben Newton (Australian footballer), (born 1992) Australian rules footballer
