= Richard Newton =

Richard Newton may refer to:

- Richard Newton (caricaturist) (1777–1798), English caricaturist
- A. Richard Newton (1951–2007), Australian-born American electrical engineer
- Richard Newton (academic) (1676–1753), English academic, Principal of Hertford College, Oxford
- Richard Newton (actor), American film and television actor, see Matlock
- Richard Newton (justice) (died 1448), English justice
- Richard Orr Newton (1905–1963), politician in British Columbia, Canada
- Richard Blake Newton (1801–1868), English landowner
- Richard Bullen Newton (1854–1926), British paleontologist
- R. Heber Newton (1840–1914), American Episcopalian priest and writer
- Richard Newton, justice on the Supreme court of Victoria, see John David Phillips
- Richard Legh, 5th Baron Newton, a Baron in the peerage of the United Kingdom
