= Leo Newton =

Welsh footballer

Personal information
- Full name: Leonard Frank Newton
- Date of birth: January or February 1888
- Place of birth: Halifax, Nova Scotia, Canada
- Date of death: 7 February 1939 (aged 51)
- Place of death: Cardiff, Wales
- Positions: Centre-forward; half-back

Senior career*
Years	Team	Apps	(Gls)
1906–191?	Cardiff Post Office		
1910–191?	Cardiff Corinthians		
190?–1914	Cardiff City	4	(0)

International career
1912–1913	Wales Amateur	2	(0)
1912	Wales	1	(0)
- * Club domestic league appearances and goals

Leonard Frank Newton (January or February 1888 – 7 February 1939), commonly known as Len or Leo Newton, was a Welsh footballer who played as a centre-forward or half-back and made one appearance for the Wales national team.

== Club career ==
On Saturdays, Newton played for Cardiff Corinthians in the early 1910s as a centre-forward. He was also a founding member and captain of Cardiff Post Office Soccer Club, established in 1906, who he played for on Wednesdays. When called upon, Newton also played for Cardiff City as a forward or half-back, appearing in matches of the South Wales League. Between 1911 and 1914, he made four appearances for Cardiff City in the Southern League.

== International career ==
Newton made his debut for the Wales amateur team on 17 February 1912 in Bishop Auckland against England, which finished as a 0–3 loss. He impressed selectors for holding Vivian Woodward during the match, thus earning himself his first and only cap for Wales on 13 April 1912 in the 1911–12 British Home Championship against Ireland. The home match, which was played in Cardiff, finished as a 2–3 loss for Wales. Newton made his second and final amateur international appearance in the following year, again a loss against England, this time by a score of 1–3 in Llandudno on 8 February.

== Personal life ==
Newton was born to Ellen Newton in January or February 1888 in Halifax, Nova Scotia, Canada, but by 1891 he and his family lived in the English village of Beer, Devon at the age of 3. By 1901, at the age of 13, he and his family resided in Cardiff. Newton married Bertha Elizabeth Hosgood on 25 December 1909 in Cardiff, where he worked as a post office sorting clerk and telegraphist. On 7 February 1939, Newton died in Cardiff at the age of 51.

== Career statistics ==
=== International ===
Wales
Year	Apps	Goals
1912	1	0
Total	1	0
