= Thomas Newton (politician) =

English politician

Thomas Newton (died 1399) was an English politician. He sat as MP for London in November 1390.

He also served as collector of customs and subsidies in Southampton from 25 February 1386 till 25 July 1387, ambassador to treat for a truce with Flanders on 20 May 1388, warden of the Mercers' Co. from 24 June 1391 till 1392, commissioner of sewers in Essex in October 1391, and oyer and terminer in Middlesex in July 1393 concerning counterfeiting, alderman of Langbourn Ward from 12 March 1392 till his death, auditor of London from 21 September 1395 till 1396 and Sheriff of London and Middlesex from 25 June 1392 till Michaelmas 1393.

He married a woman named Anne or Avice before February 1390.
