= Jack Newton (footballer) =

Australian rules footballer

Personal information
- Full name: Jack Newton
- Born: 24 May 1952 (age 74)
- Original team: Bulleen-Templestowe
- Height: 188 cm (6 ft 2 in)
- Weight: 76 kg (168 lb)

Playing career^{1}
Years	Club	Games (Goals)
1971; 1973	Fitzroy	12 (33)
- ^{1} Playing statistics correct to the end of 1973.

Jack Newton is a former Australian rules footballer, who played for the Fitzroy Football Club in the Victorian Football League (VFL).
