= Frances E. Newton =

English missionary

Frances E. Newton DStJ
- Born: Frances Emily Newton; 4 November 1871; Mickleover Manor, Mickleover, Derbyshire, England
- Died: 11 June 1955 (aged 83); Chelsea, London, England
- Relatives: Edith Eleanor Newton (half-sister)

Frances Emily Newton DStJ (4 November 1871 – 11 June 1955) was an English missionary who lived and worked in Palestine from 1889 until 1938, the last 18 years of which saw the country under British rule. She became Dame of Justice of the Venerable Order of Saint John in 1930, and was a member of the Palestine Women's Council, a consultative committee that advised the British, usually to no avail, on matters affecting women and children. The journalist Owen Tweedy described her as, "comely but podgy—tall & masterful and with the hell of a temper and always having rows."

She was a founding member and honorary secretary of the Palestine Information Centre, referred to by the British Arab News Bulletin as the "first office to put the Arab view before the British public." Described by Norman Bentwich, the first Attorney-General of Mandatory Palestine, as "incurably anti-Jewish ... and a principal supporter of the Arab cause," she also founded the Anglo-Arab Friendship Committee in 1946, with the aim of opposing Zionism.

Living on Mount Carmel in Haifa, Newton became known as someone willing to document acts of violence against Arabs suspected of opposing British rule. She found herself in trouble in 1938 after publishing two pamphlets, Punitive Methods in Palestine, which accused the British of atrocities and was denounced in the House of Commons as "all lies," and Searchlight on Palestine; Fair Play or Terrorist Methods, which supported the 1936–1939 Arab revolt. The British issued an exclusion order and she was deported in October 1938. When she died of a heart attack in 1955, a British official said she had, "the exterior of an English woman and the mind of a Palestinian."

== Early life and education ==
Newton was born on 4 November 1871 at Mickleover Manor, Mickleover (present-day Derby) to Charles Edmund Newton, a banker, and Mary Henrietta Newton (née Moore). The third of four siblings, Newton was educated at home by a governess in a strict evangelical household. From her father's first marriage Newton had five older paternal half-siblings, including the Church Missionary Society (CMS) missionary Edith Eleanor Newton and the Deaconess Constance Newton. (Note: Edith and Constance Newton are also cited as being her stepsisters.)

Newton first visited Palestine in 1888 to see her half-sisters, Edith and Constance. Within a year, Newton had signed up with the CMS as a volunteer, learning Arabic and travelling throughout Palestine and Jordan. Her mother died in 1893, leaving Newton sufficient funds to be able to volunteer indefinitely. She was trained in nursing and social work in Birmingham, and in missionary work at The Olives in Hampstead, the CMS training centre. She left for Jaffa on 3 October 1895.

== World War I ==
Newton volunteered to serve as a police officer in Leicester Square during the war, but instead she became the secretary of the Syria and Palestine Relief Fund, which had been set up by Rennie MacInnes, an Anglican bishop in Jerusalem. She represented the Fund on a committee with the Red Cross and the order of St John of Jerusalem, which led to her recognition by the latter as a lady of grace, and later as a dame of justice.

She became acquainted with T. E. Lawrence and with King Faisal, the latter visiting her at her home on Mount Carmel.

== Activism ==
Jonathan Dimbleby writes that Newton was scrupulous in keeping notes of the cases she examined. On 22 February 1938 she visited the village of Igzim, near Haifa, which had undergone a collective punishment after the assassination of a British officer, a Squadron Leader Alderton. She wrote: "I entered many of the houses and can only say that the havoc which had been wrought was indescribable, and, unless seen with one's own eyes, unbelievable."

In sixty houses, she found that doors had been torn from their hinges, mirrors smashed, cupboards emptied, furniture smashed to pieces, bedding and clothing soaked in olive oil. Nine hundred sheep and goats had been rounded up by British soldiers and taken to Haifa. The owners had to buy the animals back for eight shillings a head.

A month later, the village's residents left after the British installed 40 police officers, requiring the villagers to pay the cost of their upkeep, which was 90 pounds a month. Rather than wait for the authorities to seize their possessions in lieu of payment, the villagers fled, some of them moving to shelters made of sacks under olive trees in nearby fields.

=== Anti-Zionism ===
Newton was criticized for the virulence of her anti-Zionist activity, which stretched to publishing in 1946 a defence of Mohammad Amin al-Husayni, the Grand Mufti of Jerusalem, who had met Adolf Hitler in 1941. The pamphlet, The Truth about the Mufti, was published by the Anglo-Arab Friendship Society, which she controlled, and excused his collaboration with the Nazis. In her autobiography, Fifty Years in Palestine, Newton blamed the British for the Mufti's relationship with Hitler.

=== Deportation ===
Newton exclusion order was issued under Regulation 15 of the Emergency Regulations Act, 1936, as amended by Defence (Amendment) regulations (No. 19), 1938. It was appealed in December 1939 but was upheld by the Chief Secretary of Palestine. Newton appealed again, pleading that her exclusion affected her ability to safeguard her business interests in the country, and the order was eventually lifted in September 1943.

== Death ==
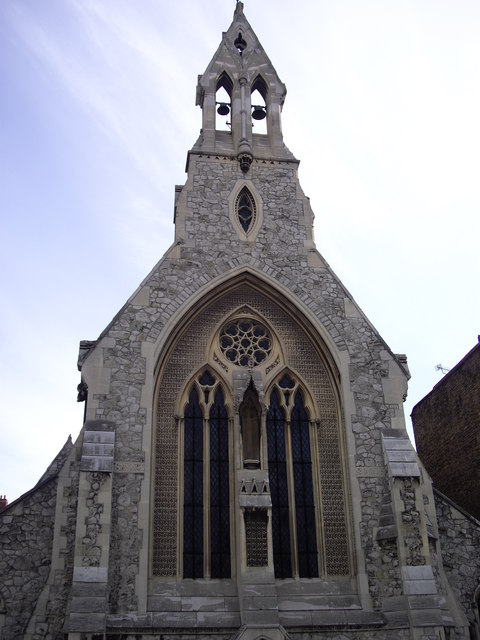
St Simon Zelotes Church, Milner Street (2009)

Newton died in her sleep of a heart attack in 1955 at home in Flat 8, 9 Wilbraham Place, Chelsea. Her funeral was held at St Simon Zelotes church, Milner Street, Chelsea, followed by cremation at Putney Vale. She left 44,675 pounds and two shillings, a substantial sum at the time, all or most of which went to provide medical services for Palestinian refugees in Jordan.

== Works ==
- Fifty Years in Palestine. London: Coldharbour Press, Ltd. 1948.
- Palestine: Britain's honour at stake. 1947.

== See also ==
- 1936–1939 Arab revolt in Palestine
- Freya Stark
