= USS Greyhound (1822) =

History

United States
- Name: USS Greyhound
- Acquired: 1822
- Fate: Sold 1824

General characteristics
- Type: Schooner
- Tons burthen: 65 (bm)
- Propulsion: Sails
- Sail plan: Schooner
- Complement: 31
- Armament: 3 guns

The first USS Greyhound was a U.S. Navy, two-masted schooner in commission from 1822 to 1824.

Greyhound was one of several ships the U.S. Navy purchased in 1822 to augment Commodore David Porter's "Mosquito Fleet" combating piracy in the West Indies. With Master Commandant John Porter in command, she joined the West Indies Squadron in early 1823 and almost immediately was dispatched to Puerto Rico to seek Puerto Rican aid in suppressing the pirates. Returning from this mission, Greyhound was placed under the command of Lieutenant Lawrence Kearny and sent to patrol the coast of Cuba.

While patrolling with the schooner USS Beagle on 21 July 1823, Greyhound gave chase to an unidentified ship off the Cuban coast near Vera Cruz; the ship turned out to be a legitimate Colombian privateer, a rare thing in those waters. Lieutenant Kearny then decided to go ashore in search of game to supplant his ship's food supply. His boat, when it neared the shore, was attacked from ambush and forced to return to Greyhound.

When another attempt to land on 22 July 1823 met the same reception, Lieutenant Kearny sent ashore a party of United States Marines and U.S. Navy sailors under the command of Lieutenant David Farragut, to attack the pirate camp. Meanwhile Greyhound and Beagle closed the shore and began to bombard the camp, effectively trapping the pirates between the landing party and the sea. After a brief but fierce struggle, the pirates, including some women and children, fled inland. Exploring the village, Farragut and his men discovered several large caves filled with rich plunder of all sorts. They burned the village and the eight small boats they found in the harbor, then returned to Greyhound and Beagle.

Greyhound continued her coastal patrol duties until, with the onset of the yellow fever season later in 1823, the "Mosquito Fleet" sailed north for healthier weather.

Greyhound did not return to the Caribbean with Porter in the spring of 1824. After a survey found her unfit for further service, the Navy sold her at Baltimore, Maryland, in 1824.

== See also ==
- List of historical schooners

== Bibliography ==
- —— (2008). Piracy: The Complete History. Osprey Publishing. p. 336. ISBN 9781846032400. Url
- Mahan, Alfred Thayer (1892). Admiral Farragut.
  D. Appleton and company, New York. p. 333. E'Book
- Porter, David Dixon (1875). Memoir of Commodore David Porter: of the United States Navy.
  J. Munsel, publishers, New York. p. 427. E'Book (Primary source)
- Spears, John Randolph (1905). David G. Farragut.
  G.W. Jacobs, Philadelphia. p. 407. E'Book
