= James O. Newton =

American football and basketball coach

Biographical details
- Born: March 28, 1882; Dexter City, Ohio, U.S.
- Died: August 10, 1938 (aged 56); Lima, Ohio, U.S.
- Education: Ohio State (1903, DDS)

Coaching career (HC unless noted)

Football
- 1918–1920: Heidelberg
- 1922–1923: Ohio Northern

Men's basketball
- 1919–1921: Heidelberg
- 1922–1927: Ohio Northern

Women's basketball
- 1922: Ohio Northern

Administrative career (AD unless noted)
- 1921–1929: Ohio Northern

Head coaching record
- Overall: 28–15 (football); 64–66 (basketball)

James Otto Newton (March 28, 1882 – August 10, 1938) was an American football and basketball coach.

== Early years ==
Newton earned his DDS degree from Ohio State University in 1903.

== Heidelberg ==
Newton served as the head football coach at Heidelberg University from 1918 to 1920 and, also, as the school's head men's basketball coach from 1919 to 1921.

== Ohio Northern ==
Newton moved to Ada, Ohio to become the head football coach (1922–1923), men's basketball coach (1922–1927), and women's basketball coach (1922).

== Head coaching record ==
=== Football ===
Year	Team	Overall	Conference	Standing	Bowl/playoffs
Heidelberg (Independent) (1918–1919)
1918	Heidelberg	5–1			
1919	Heidelberg	6–3			
Heidelberg (Ohio Athletic Conference) (1920)
1920	Heidelberg	7–2	3–2	T–6th	
Heidelberg:		18–6	3–2		
Ohio Northern Polar Bears (Ohio Athletic Conference) (1922–1923)
1922	Ohio Northern	4–5	2–5	14th	
1923	Ohio Northern	6–4	3–4	12th	
Ohio Northern:		10–9	5–9		
Total:		28–15			
