= Frank Newton (defender, born 1902) =

English footballer

Personal information
- Date of birth: 1902
- Place of birth: Romiley, England
- Height: 6 ft 0 in (1.83 m)
- Position: Centre half

Senior career*
| Years | Team | Apps | (Gls) |
- Menston Town
| 1921–1922 | Bradford City | 1 | (0) |
- Northampton Town
- Halifax Town
- * Club domestic league appearances and goals

Frank Newton (born 1902) was an English professional footballer who played as a centre half.

== Career ==
Born in Romiley, Newton joined Bradford City from Menston Town in August 1921. He made 1 league appearance for the club. He left the club in May 1922 to sign for Northampton Town, and later played for Halifax Town.

== Sources ==
- Frost, Terry (1988). Bradford City A Complete Record 1903-1988. Breedon Books Sport. ISBN 0-907969-38-0.
