= Tony Newton =

Tony Newton may refer to:

- Tony Newton, Baron Newton of Braintree (1937–2012), British Conservative politician
- Tony Newton (American musician) (born 1948), musician, producer and arranger from Detroit
- Tony Newton (English musician) English bassist and producer
