= George Newton =

George Newton may refer to:

- George Newton, 1st Baron Eltisley (1879–1942), British Conservative politician
- George Newton (speedway rider) (1913–1984), English international speedway rider
- George Newton (minister) (1602–1681), English ejected nonconformist minister
- George Newton (clergyman), American Presbyterian minister sometimes credited with naming Mount Pisgah in North Carolina
- George Newton (Virginia politician), 17th century American politician
- George Newton (weightlifter) (1936–2016), international weightlifter
- George Newton, a character in the film series Beethoven
