= Alan Newton =

Alan Newton may refer to:

- Alan Newton (cricketer) (1894–1979), Australian cricketer
- Alan Newton (cyclist) (1931–2023), British cyclist
- Sir Alan Newton (surgeon) (1887–1949), Australian surgeon
