= Edward Newton (cricketer) =

English cricketer

Personal information
- Born: 31 October 1871; Blackmoor, Hampshire, England
- Died: 9 May 1906 (aged 34); Edinburgh, Midlothian, Scotland

Domestic team information
- Years: Team
- 1900: Hampshire

Career statistics
Competition	First-class
Matches	17
Runs scored	568
Batting average	18.32
100s/50s	0/3
Top score	69
Catches/stumpings	8/–
- Source: Cricinfo, 3 January 2010

Edward Newton (31 October 1871 — 9 May 1906) was an English first-class cricketer.

Newton was born in October 1871 at Blackmoor, Hampshire. A club cricketer in Southampton for Deanery Cricket Club, he made his debut in first-class cricket for Hampshire against Lancashire at Old Trafford in the 1900 County Championship, with Newton making seventeen first-class appearances in 1900. Described by Wisden as a "very useful batsman, [and] a most brilliant field", he scored a total of 568 runs in these matches, at an average of 18.32; he made three half centuries, with a highest score of 69. In the field, he took eight catches. Besides playing, Newton coached cricket at Marlborough College, where amongst the students he coached there was Reggie Spooner, who would later play Test cricket for England. Newton died from pneumonia at Edinburgh in May 1906.
