= Thomas Jerome Newton =

Thomas Jerome Newton can refer to:

- A character in the novel The Man Who Fell to Earth
  - Thomas Jerome Newton was played by David Bowie in the 1976 film adaptation
  - The character was renamed John Dory and played by Lewis Smith in the 1987 TV film adaptation
  - Bowie's version of the character was played by Michael C. Hall in the musical sequel Lazarus
- A character in the show Fringe, played by Sebastian Roché
