= Matty Newton =

Matthew "Matty" Newton
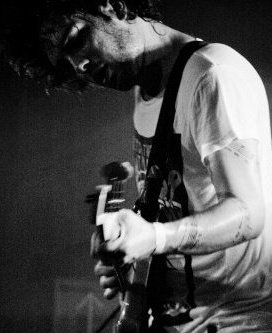

Background information
- Birth name: Matthew Netwon
- Born: 3 January 1984 (age 41); Brisbane, Queensland, Australia
- Genres: Alternative rock, pop punk, emo, pop rock, electro, indie rock, hip hop, pop, alternative rock
- Occupation(s): Musician, bassist, guitarist, songwriter
- Instrument(s): Bass, guitar, keyboard, drums
- Years active: 2003–present

Matthew "Matty" Newton (born 3 January 1984) is an Australian songwriter, bass player, guitarist, keyboardist and producer from Queensland, Australia.

== Biography ==
Matty Newton got his start in the Australian music scene as bass player for Brisbane indie rock band Repeat Offender from 2003 through 2009. In 2008 Newton and Erinn Swan formed the band Streamer Bendy. He has also spent time performing as a guitarist with rock bands Trial Kennedy, Tourism and Nina May. Newton has worked closely with a lot of bands in Australia, notably as touring guitar technician for bands The Butterfly Effect, Trial Kennedy and Tourism, occasionally joining the latter on guitar. Newton spent three years as the bass player for the Tribute Theatre Company, Showtime where he toured the world for several years. In 2010 Newton was approached by The Veronicas to play bass and contribute to songwriting for their third album, and subsequently spent several months living in Los Angeles with the band before parting ways to continue work on the never-released Streamer Bendy project in Stockholm, Sweden.

In 2012 Newton's solo project, The Rebound Girl, was shortlisted for "Best Urban Release" in the QLD Music Awards.

== Repeat Offender ==
As a founding member, Newton played bass, wrote the songs and managed Australian band Repeat Offender who released several albums and toured with bands such as The Veronicas, The Butterfly Effect, and Panic! at the Disco and played festivals such as Taste of Chaos and Big Day Out. Repeat Offender released their first EP, To a Modern Love..., in May 2006 independently and debuted at number 23 in the Australian singles charts. Repeat Offender toured heavily and performed over 600 shows between 2003 and 2009.

== Streamer Bendy ==
Streamer Bendy were a Brisbane band that recorded their self-titled debut album between Stockholm, Los Angeles, Brisbane and Sydney. Newton formed the band in 2008 with Erinn Swan, formerly of Nina May. Initially the bass player for the group, Newton has also toured as their drummer, guitarist and keyboardist after several line-up changes. Along with Swan, Newton was a primary songwriter for the group.

== Queen, it's a Kind of Magic ==
Queen, it's a Kind of Magic was the world's largest and most successful Queen tribute act. As a touring member of this group from 2009 to 2010 Newton performed hundreds of shows in Australia, New Zealand, Canada, South Africa, Hong Kong, Indonesia and Singapore. He also performed as a bass player for other shows produced by Showtime Entertainment during this time, including an ABBA show and a Hannah Montana / Miley Cyrus production.

== The Hangout ==
The Hangout are a Brisbane band that formed in 2013 and released two singles, "Amsterdam" and "Those Girls" later that year. Newton was a primary songwriter and performer for the band.

== Tourism ==
Tourism are an indie-rock back from Brisbane, Australia. Fronted by British ex-pat Jozef Wisniewski, they toured heavily around Australia from 2010 to 2014, releasing several singles including "City Never Sleeps" (produced by Steven Schram), "Run" (produced by Lewis Stephenson - Jungle Giants/The Belligerents), and "Supermodel" (Sean Cook - Yves Klein Blue/Big Scary). The band received generous airplay across Australia.

== Jared Porter ==
In 2015, Newton joined 2014 Toyota StarMaker winner Jared Porter for several key country music shows: CMC Rocks Festival, Country Summer (Sonoma County CA), and Music In The Mulga. Newton fulfills multiple roles for Porter: organ, keys, lead guitar, rhythm guitar, bass and synthesizer.

== Joe Vish ==
This project from Tourism frontman Josef Wisniewski was to release music in 2016.

== Equipment ==
- Newton plays Fender basses and guitars, including a Tony Franklin Fretted P-Bass, American Deluxe Stratocasters and Squier BassVI models. He also plays a Roland VK-7 organ, Gibson SG and various Korg synthesizers.

== Discography ==
- 1999: CareFactorZero EP
- 2000: CareFactorZero So Sorry
- 2004: Repeat Offender Red for you EP
- 2006: Repeat Offender To a modern love
- 2007: Repeat Offender Black Hearts and Poison Girls
- 2008: Repeat Offender Archives
- 2008: Nina May "Crazy/Insane" single
- 2008: Streamer Bendy Streamer Bendy
- 2010: Streamer Bendy "You're So Cool" single
- 2012: Repeat Offender Fame EP
- 2013: The Hangout "Amsterdam" single
- 2013: The Hangout "Those Girls" single
- 2014: Tourism TOURISM EP
- 2014: Tourism "Supermodel" single
- 2014: Tourism "RUN" single
- 2016: Joe Vish "Holy Roller" single
