= Albert Newton (footballer) =

English footballer (1894–1975)

Personal information
- Full name: Albert Newton
- Date of birth: 13 March 1894
- Place of birth: Barnsley, England
- Date of death: 1975 (aged 80–81)
- Height: 5 ft 11 in (1.80 m)
- Position: Outside left

Senior career*
Years	Team	Apps	(Gls)
- Barnsley St George's
191?–1926	Barnsley	225	(22)
1926	Bradford City	4	(0)
- * Club domestic league appearances and goals

Albert Newton (13 March 1894 – 1975) was an English professional footballer who made 229 appearances in the Football League playing as an outside left.

== Career ==
Newton was born in Barnsley. He began his career with Barnsley St George's, and moved on to Barnsley, for whom he made 225 appearances in the Football League Second Division. He joined Bradford City in May 1926. He made 4 league appearances for the club. He was released by the club in October 1926.

Newton died in 1975.

== Sources ==
- Frost, Terry (1988). Bradford City A Complete Record 1903–1988. Breedon Books Sport. ISBN 0-907969-38-0.
