= Erinn Swan =

- Birth name: Erinn Swan
- Born: 19 July 1984 (age 41)
- Genres: Rock, pop rock, pop, hip hop
- Occupation(s): Singer, songwriter, actress
- Years active: 2004–present

Erinn Swan (born 19 July 1984) is an Australian singer and songwriter from Brisbane. She is also an A&R Representative for Sony Music Australia and Head of Digital for the Australian Labor Party.

== Biography ==
Swan is the daughter of politician Wayne Swan. She is the lead singer for the Brisbane based band The Hangout. She has performed live on MTV's The Lair, Channel 9, NOVA and AUSTEREO national radio, and supported the likes of The Klaxons, Good Charlotte, Kisschasy, Stafford Brothers, among others. Swan is also an actress and has appeared in many Brisbane based projects, including the lead role in Yahoo7's PS TRIXI, and has been a reporter for Austero's Hot 30, which broadcasts nationwide. Swan is also an active member of the Australian Youth Music Council. She is Sony Music’s A&R scout for Queensland. She also ran a small independent label, Smile or Die Music, for three years, where she managed and worked intimately with the Brisbane scene. Additionally, she worked at Mercury Mobility for a year where she drove efforts involving programming music for mobile platforms and researching and developing programs for how to cope with the music industries’ shift to the digital realm.

== Bands ==
Swan was the lead singer of progressive rock band Nina May and pop rock band Streamer Bendy, and is currently a vocalist for pop rock/hip-hop band The Hangout. She travels extensively to Los Angeles and Sweden, where she writes with the likes of Wayne Beckford.

== Musical career ==
- 2001–2005 – lead singer of Darren J Ray Band
- 2003–2005 – vocal/dance teacher (private/group tuition)
- 2004 – solo vocalist, QUT big band
- 2006 – Bachelor of Music QUT
- 2006–2008 – lead singer/writer of Nina May (live on MTV, Kerri-Anne Kennerley, spot rotation Triple J)
- 2006–present – A&R REP Sony Music Australia
- 2006–present – management/promotions/co-founder of Smile or Die Music
- 2008–2009 – music programmer/label liaison Mercury Mobility (3Mobile/Optus/Telecom New Zealand/Bell Canada)
- 2009 – Bell Hughs songwriting trip to Stockholm, Sweden. Wrote with notable pop writers including Wayne Beckford (Akon, Britney Spears, Robyn)
- 2009 – lead role in theatre production ABBA national tour of South Africa, 17 November 2009 – 19 January 2010
- 2009 – lead singer/writer of Streamer Bendy (medium rotation Triple J)
- 2013 – lead singer/writer of The Hangout

== Acting career ==
- 2001 – NIDA Open Learning School
- 2002 – Music Theatre Summer School, QUT
- 2004–2006 – private coaching Martin Challis QUT
- July 2004 – completed QUT Continuing Professional Education – Acting (completed intermediate module)
- 2006 – lead role of Trixi in PS Trixi with Yahoo7! and Hoodlum Active – multi-platform Internet drama ad "Hero", McDonald's Lean Beef Burger TV campaign

== Discography ==
- 2007: Nina May – Make Love to Your Stereo
- 2007: Paper Champion – Paper Champion EP
- 2008: Nina May – Crazy/Insane EP
- 2008: Streamer Bendy – Streamer Bendy
- 2010: Streamer Bendy – "You're So Cool" single
- 2013: The Hangout – "Amsterdam" single
