= Paul Newton =

Paul Newton may refer to:

- Paul Newton (artist), Australian painter
- Paul Newton (DJ), British electronic dance music DJ and producer
- Paul Newton (musician) (born 1948), British rock musician
- Paul Newton (politician) (born 1960), American politician, Republican member of the North Carolina State Senate
- Paul Newton (British Army officer), British Army officer 1975–2012
