= Charles Newton =

Charles Newton may refer to:

- Charles Newton (actor) (1874–1926), American silent film actor
- Charles Newton (inventor) (1870–1932), American firearm designer and inventor
- C. M. Newton (1930–2018), American basketball coach
- Charles D. Newton (1861–1930), NY State Attorney General, 1919–1922
- Sir Charles Thomas Newton (1816–1894), British archaeologist
- Charles Newton (American football) (1916–1994), American football back
