= Michael Newton =

Michael Newton may refer to:

- Michael Newton (footballer) (born 1987), Australian rules footballer for Melbourne in the Australian Football League
- Michael Newton (author) (1951–2021), American author best known for his work on Don Pendleton's Mack Bolan series
- Michael Newton (hypnotist) (1931–2016), known for his books about past life regression
- Michael Newton (field hockey) (born 1952), American field hockey player
- Sir Michael Newton, 4th Baronet (c. 1695–1743), Member of Parliament for Grantham and Beverley
- Michael Newton (died 1803), Member of Parliament for Beverley
- Michael A. Newton (born 1964), Canadian statistician

== See also ==
- Mike Newton (disambiguation)
