= David Newton =

David Newton may refer to:

- David Newton (artist) (1953–2011), American artist
- David Newton (pianist) (born 1958), Scottish jazz pianist and composer
- David Newton (guitarist), with the British band The Mighty Lemon Drops
- David George Newton (1935–2016), United States Ambassador to Iraq, 1985–1988, and to Yemen, 1994–1997
