= Robert E. Newton =

American politician (born 1931)

Member of the Iowa House of Representatives
- In office 1969–1971

Personal details
- Born: July 11, 1931 (age 95) Muscatine, Iowa, U.S.
- Party: Democratic
- Occupation: professor

Robert Edward Newton (born July 11, 1931) is an American retired politician in the state of Iowa.

Newton was born in Muscatine, Iowa. He attended the University of Iowa and earned a PhD at the Catholic University of America. He is a college professor. He served in the Iowa House of Representatives from 1969 to 1971 as a Democrat.
