= Harry Newton (cricketer) =

English cricketer

Personal information
- Full name: Harry Newton
- Born: 2 May 1935; Little Lever, Lancashire, England
- Died: 22 December 2014 (aged 79); Bolton, Lancashire, England
- Batting: Right-handed
- Bowling: Right-arm fast-medium

Domestic team information
- Years: Team
- 1966: Sussex

Career statistics
Competition	First-class
Matches	2
Runs scored	16
Batting average	8.00
100s/50s	–/–
Top score	16*
Balls bowled	396
Wickets	6
Bowling average	23.50
5 wickets in innings	1
10 wickets in match	–
Best bowling	5/54
Catches/stumpings	–/–
- Source: Cricinfo, 25 December 2011

Harry Newton (2 May 1935 – 22 December 2014) was an English cricketer. Newton was a right-handed batsman who bowled right-arm fast-medium. He was born at Little Lever, Lancashire.

Newton made two first-class appearances for Sussex against Hampshire and Essex in the 1966 County Championship. Against Hampshire, Newton ended unbeaten on 16 in Sussex's first-innings of 153, while in Hampshire's first-innings he took what would be his only first-class five wicket haul, with figures of 5/54 from 32 overs to help bowl Hampshire out for 128. He was again unbeaten during Sussex's second-innings, though without scoring, while in Hampshire's second-innings he bowled 10 wicketless overs. Hampshire won the match by 9 wickets. Against Essex, he was dismissed for a duck by Brian Edmeades in Sussex's first-innings total of 86, while in Essex's first-innings he took the wicket of Barry Knight, finishing with figures of 1/28 from 20 overs. He was again dismissed for a duck in Sussex's second-innings, this time by Tony Jorden, with Sussex being dismissed for 132 to set Essex a target of 66, which they easily chased down to win by 9 wickets. These were his only major appearances for Sussex.
