= Harold Newton (cricketer) =

English cricketer

Harold 'Mike' Newton (5 September 1918 – 11 August 2007) was an English cricketer who played for Northamptonshire. He was born in Overstone and died in Towcester.

Newton made a single first-class appearance, during the 1938 season, against Worcestershire. From the tailend, he scored 2 runs in the first innings in which he batted, and a duck in the second innings. Northamptonshire lost the match by 2 wickets.
