= Arthur Newton (cricketer) =

English cricketer (1862–1952)

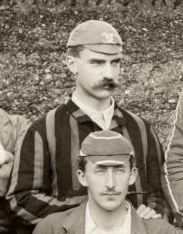
- Newton in about 1892

Personal information
- Full name: Arthur Edward Newton
- Born: 12 September 1862; Corfe, Taunton, Somerset, England
- Died: 15 September 1952 (aged 90); Trull, Somerset, England
- Batting: Right-handed
- Role: Wicket-keeper

Domestic team information
- Years: Team
- 1880–1914: Somerset
- 1885: Oxford University
- FC debut: 21 May 1885 Oxford Univ. v Lancashire
- Last FC: 1 August 1914 Somerset v Derbyshire

Career statistics
Competition	First-class
Matches	217
Runs scored	3,614
Batting average	12.59
100s/50s	0/6
Top score	77
Balls bowled	15
Wickets	0
Bowling average	–
5 wickets in innings	–
10 wickets in match	–
Best bowling	–
Catches/stumpings	320/130
- Source: CricketArchive, 28 December 2009

Arthur Edward Newton (12 September 1862 – 15 September 1952) was an English cricketer who played for Somerset in the county's pre-first-class days and then for more than 20 years after the team entered the County Championship in 1891. He also played for Oxford University and for a variety of amateur teams. As a cricketer, he was known as "A. E.", not by his forename.

Newton was a right-handed lower order batsman and a wicket-keeper. Educated at Eton College, he played in the Lord's matches against Harrow School for three years and then went to Pembroke College, Oxford, where he appeared in the freshmen's trial match in 1882. But he did not get into the university team until 1885, when he made his first-class debut in the match against Lancashire. In his third match, batting at No 9, he made 57 against Surrey. He retained his place as wicket-keeper to win his blue in the University match against Cambridge at Lord's.

At the end of the 1885 season, Newton was a member of an amateur side raised by the Devon cricketer Edward Sanders that played matches in North America, with two of the games later being designated as first-class. Two years later, he was a member of a rather larger touring side, this time organised by George Vernon and including Lord Hawke, Andrew Stoddart and professionals such as Bobby Abel and Bobby Peel, which toured Australia for five months in the winter of 1887–88, playing first-class matches and a variety of other games against state and scratch teams. Vernon's team was a strong one. One of the bigger matches of the tour was at Melbourne Cricket Ground against an Australian XI which contained 10 Test players: Vernon's XI won by an innings and Newton, one of only three non-Test players in his team, made 77, starting a revival in his team's single innings after the first six wickets had fallen for 51 runs to a final total of 292. The innings of 77 remained the highest of Newton's long career, not surpassed, though he equalled it in 1900.

== County cricket ==
According to his obituary in the 1953 edition of Wisden, Newton started playing for Somerset in 1880, and his final appearance for the side was 35 seasons later in 1914. The first match for which statistics are readily available was a two-day non-first-class match between Somerset and Marylebone Cricket Club (MCC) at Taunton in August 1880: Newton made 14 in a match that Somerset won by an innings, and it is not clear whether he kept wicket or not. Somerset's matches between 1882 and 1885 are regarded as first-class, but Newton did not play in any of these games. He was, however, in the side in 1886 for a non-first-class game against Warwickshire at Edgbaston when Sammy Woods made his debut and took a wicket with his first ball: "C. W. Rock, batting for Warwickshire, missed a very fast yorker on the leg-side, and Newton stumped him brilliantly."

From 1887 onwards, Newton played regularly for Somerset in the second half of most seasons. From 1891, Somerset resumed first-class cricket status, and Newton played in the first County Championship match involving the team, against Middlesex at Lord's. In these early days of Somerset's first-class cricket, the county did not lack capable amateur wicket-keepers, and Newton shared the position with the Rev. Archdale Wickham and then Henry Martyn, with the Test player Leslie Gay intervening for a season in 1894. For the seven seasons from 1897 to 1903, Newton played fairly regularly, and his batting improved in these seasons. In 1899, his batting average was more than 20 for the only time in his career, and he made an unbeaten 64 in a high-scoring match against Surrey at Taunton. In 1900, batting in the unaccustomedly high position of No 5 in the batting order, he made 77, equalling his highest career score, in the match against Gloucestershire at Bristol: this was a good match for wicket-keeper/batsmen, with Wickham, Newton's Somerset colleague, making his highest career score with 28 and Jack Board, the Gloucestershire wicket-keeper, trumping both of them with a score of 214 to give his side an innings victory.

Newton's wicket-keeping in this period was also of high quality: against Middlesex at Lord's in 1901, he dismissed nine batsmen in the match, with six catches and three stumpings, to set a Somerset record for first-class cricket that has been equalled but not surpassed in the 109 years since. In two other matches in 1901 and 1902 he made seven dismissals. His representative cricket at higher level, though, was restricted to just two matches for the Gentlemen in the Gentlemen v Players series, one at The Oval in 1897 and the other the more important Lord's match in 1902. He did not progress to Test selection, however.

After the 1903 season, Newton reverted to more occasional first-class cricket appearances with Somerset, playing at least one match each season through to 1914, but never more than nine games. His final match for the county ended just three days before the outbreak of World War I; according to Wisden, Newton "showed remarkable form behind the wickets for a man approaching the age of fifty-two".

== Later life ==
Newton continued to play club cricket well beyond normal retirement age: his obituary in Wisden records that he played for amateur sides such as the Somerset Stragglers until he was 81. It noted: "When 74, having cycled to the Taunton ground to turn out for Somerset Stragglers, he demonstrated that his ability had not seriously declined by stumping five batsmen." He also continued hunting in the Taunton area into his 80s.

== Death ==
Newton died on 15 September 1952, three days after his 90th birthday.
