= Mark Charan Newton =

British fantasy author (born 1981)

- Born: 1981 (age 44–45)
- Occupation: Novelist
- Writing career
- Genre: Fantasy
- Notable work: The Legends of the Red Sun
- Website: markcnewton.com

Mark Charan Newton (born 1981) was a British fantasy author. He is best known for his fantasy series The Legends of the Red Sun, published by Tor UK, an imprint of Pan Macmillan. He was also a book reviewer for The Ecologist, UK's oldest ecological magazine. As Mark Newton he also writes regularly for the whisky industry for various magazines, including being a reviewer for Whisky Magazine.

== Biography ==
Mark Charan Newton was born in 1981. His first and last names are English in origin, while his middle name is Indian in origin. He has a degree in Environmental Science and currently lives in Nottingham, UK.

He worked for some time at the bookstore chain Ottakar's. It was during this time that he decided to start writing. This decision was influenced by reading China Miéville's novel, The Scar. At 23 years of age, he joined the publishing industry, working for the imprint Black Flame. He also co-founded an imprint called Solaris, which was later sold in 2009. In 2007, he sold rights for two books to Tor UK, and has since published a further five titles, many of which have been translated into foreign languages.

== Bibliography ==
=== The Legends of the Red Sun ===
==== Nights of Villjamur (2009), ISBN 978-0345520845 ====
Beneath a dying red sun sits the proud and ancient city of Villjamur, capital of a mighty empire that now sits powerless against an encroaching ice age. As throngs of refugees gather outside the city gates, a fierce debate rages within the walls about the fate of these desperate souls. Then tragedy strikes—and the Emperor’s elder daughter, Jamur Rika, is summoned to serve as queen. Joined by her younger sister, Jamur Eir, the queen comes to sympathize with the hardships of the common people, thanks in part to her dashing teacher Randur Estevu, a man who is not what he seems. Meanwhile, the grisly murder of a councillor draws the attention of Inspector Rumex Jeryd. Jeryd is a rumel, a species of nonhuman that can live for hundreds of years and shares the city with humans, birdlike garuda, and the eerie banshees whose forlorn cries herald death. Jeryd’s investigation will lead him into a web of corruption and to an obscene conspiracy that threatens the lives of Rika and Eir, and the future of Villjamur itself. But in the far north, where the drawn-out winter has already begun, an even greater threat appears, against which all the empire’s military and magical power may well prove useless—a threat from another world.

==== City of Ruin (2010), ISBN 978-0230712591 ====
Villiren: a city of sin that is being torn apart from the inside. Hybrid creatures shamble through shadows and barely human gangs fight turf wars for control of the streets.
Amidst this chaos, Commander Brynd Lathraea, commander of the Night Guard, must plan the defence of Villiren against a race that has broken through from some other realm and already slaughtered hundreds of thousands of the Empire’s people.
When a Night Guard soldier goes missing, Brynd requests help from the recently arrived Inqusitor Jeryd. He discovers this is not the only disappearance on the streets of Villiren. It seems that a serial killer of the most horrific kind is on the loose, taking hundreds of people from their own homes. A killer that cannot possibly be human.
The entire population of Villiren must unite to face an impossible surge of violent and unnatural enemies or the city will fall. But how can anyone save a city that is already a ruin?

==== The Book of Transformations (2011), ISBN 978-0230750067 ====
A new and corrupt Emperor seeks to rebuild the ancient structures of Villjamur to give the people of the city hope in the face of great upheaval and an oppressing ice age. But when a stranger called Shalev arrives, empowering a militant underground movement, crime and terror becomes rampant. The Inquisition is always one step behind, and military resources are spread thinly across the Empire. So Emperor Urtica calls upon cultists to help construct a group to eliminate those involved with the uprising, and calm the populace. But there’s more to The Villjamur Knights than just phenomenal skills and abilities – each have a secret that, if exposed, could destroy everything they represent.
Investigator Fulcrom of the Villjamur Inquisition is given the unenviable task of managing the Knights, but his own skills are tested when a mysterious priest, who has travelled from beyond the fringes of the Empire, seeks his help. The priest’s existence threatens the church, and his quest promises to unweave the fabric of the world. And in a distant corner of the Empire, the enigmatic cultist Dartun Súr steps back into this world, having witnessed horrors beyond his imagination. Broken, altered, he and the remnants of his cultist order are heading back to Villjamur. And all eyes turn to the Sanctuary City, for Villjamur's ancient legends are about to be shattered…

==== The Broken Isles (2012), ISBN 978-0230750074 ====
The culmination of the Legends of the Red Sun series. This takes us back to Villiren where Commander Brynd Lathera prepares for the coming battle ahead with invaders from the other world.
Villjamur is gone, Rika and her sister Eir are all that remains of the Jorsalir line and Brynd is determined that Rika will lead her people in the creation of a new city and new culture.
But Villiren has never been a city to play by the rules and, despite the impending threat of destruction, criminal gangs work to undermine everything that Brynd has set out to do. The world is on the brink of destruction and anarchy...

=== Other ===
- The Reef

=== Lukas Drakenfeld Mysteries (ongoing) ===
This is a two-book series being published by Tor UK. The first book is a locked-room murder mystery called Drakenfeld and was published in October 2013.

- Drakenfeld (10 October 2013)
- Retribution (23 October 2014)

A short story entitled "The Messenger" (14 August 2014) has been released by Newton and involves Lukas Drakenfeld trying to prevent the prince's assassination.

=== James Abbott ===
Mark Charan Newton has also published the novel The Never King (18 May 2017) under the pseudonym James Abbott.
