= Mark J. Newton and Peter Truong =

Convicted child sexual abusers

Mark J. Newton
- Known for: Sexual abuse of his adopted son
- Partner: Peter Truong
- Penalty: 40 years in prison

Peter Truong
- Known for: Sexual abuse of his adopted son
- Partner: Mark J. Newton
- Penalty: 30 years in prison

Mark J. Newton and Peter Truong are two convicted child sexual abusers arrested in Los Angeles in 2013. Truong, a Vietnamese-Australian, and Newton, from the United States, entered a civil partnership in Australia, adopted a boy from Russia in 2005 and paid his mother $8,000 for him. The pair groomed the boy for sexual abuse and flew him around the world for other men to abuse, having visited many countries by the time he was three years old. Before their crime came to light, Newton and Truong were featured in several TV programs and magazine articles about LGBT families, including a notorious interview by Australian journalist Ginger Gorman in June 2010.

The crime was accidentally revealed when police found videos of the child, identified by a distinctive henna tattoo on his chest, being abused by Newton, Truong, and others. The two were also found to be part of an international child sex ring. In June 2013, US district judge Sarah Evans Barker sentenced Newton to a 40-year federal prison sentence and in December, she sentenced Truong to 30 years, after having his sentence reduced 10 years for cooperating with the investigators.

In 2013, Ginger Gorman published a follow-up on her earlier reporting about the couple.

== See also ==
- William and Zachary Zulock, a similar case in Georgia, U.S.
