= Thomas Willoughby Newton =

American politician

Member of the U.S. House of Representatives from Arkansas's At-large district
- In office February 6, 1847 – March 3, 1847
- Preceded by: Archibald Yell
- Succeeded by: Robert W. Johnson

Personal details
- Born: Thomas Willoughby Newton; January 18, 1804 Alexandria, Virginia, U.S.
- Died: September 22, 1853 (aged 49) New York City, New York, U.S.
- Party: Whig

Thomas Willoughby Newton (January 18, 1804 – September 22, 1853) was a Whig member of the United States House of Representatives from the State of Arkansas.

Newton was born in Alexandria, Virginia, in 1804. Newton had little schooling in his early years but had great penmanship. He came to Arkansas in 1820 began his career as a post rider from Arkansas Post on the north side of the Arkansas river to Cadron. In 1825 he became clerk of the court of Pulaski County, Arkansas, and served for four years, During this time he studied law with Robert Crittenden and had become a lawyer. While living with Crittenden as an associate, Crittenden would revive many letters of disdain, and with that Newton strongly defended him. He was adjutant to Crittenden at the November 15th 1824 treaty with the Quapaws, and aide-de-camp to General William Bradford (1771–1826) in 1826. In 1829 he went to Shelbyville, Kentucky, and married Mary K. Allen, daughter of Colonel John Allen, veteran of the war of 1812. Newton remained at Shelbyville practicing law until 1837. After the admission of Arkansas to the Union, Newton brought his wife back to Arkansas, making it his home. He was elected as a Whig to the fifth State legislature and served in the Senate from November 4, 1844, to November 4, 1848. When Archibald Yell resigned his seat in Congress to become colonel of the Arkansas volunteer regiment in the Mexican–American War in 1847, Newton was elected to fill the unexpired term and served as a Whig in the Twenty-ninth Congress. This election made Newton the only person ever elected to the U.S. House from Arkansas as a Whig. Newton served in Washington for only a month, and declined to run for a full term. on September 22, 1853, at the age of 49, Newton died in New York City and is buried in the historic Mount Holly Cemetery in Little Rock. Newton County, Arkansas, was named in his honor.

Newton was a slaveholder.
