= List of ship launches in 1791 =

The list of ship launches in 1791 includes a chronological list of some ships launched in 1791.

Date	Ship	Class	Builder	Location	Country	Notes
7 January	Rattlesnake	Hound-class sloop	Nicholas Phillips	Chatham Dockyard	Great Britain	For Royal Navy.
3 March	Aréthuse	Frigate		Brest	France	For French Navy.
22 March	Bogoiavlenie Gospodne	Third rate	S. I. Afanaseyev	Saint Petersburg	Russia	For Imperial Russian Navy.
March	Vigilant	Cutter	Patrick Dennis		United States	For Revenue Cutter Service.
4 April	Soshestvie Sviatogo Dukha	Pyotr Apostol-class frigate	I. V. Dolzhnikov	Rogozhskaya	Russia	For Imperial Russian Navy.
9 April	Active	Cutter		Baltimore, Maryland	United States	For Revenue Cutter Service.
16 April	Kronprindsesse Maria	Prindsesse Sophia Frederica-class ship of the line		Arodsand	Denmark-Norway	For Dano-Norwegian Navy.
23 April	Providence	Sloop-of-War	Perry & Co.	Blackwall Yard	Great Britain	For Royal Navy.
4 May	Beaulieu	Fifth rate	Henry Adams	Buckler's Hard	Great Britain	For Royal Navy.
6 May	Sviataia Troitsa	Third rate	S. I. Afanaseyev	Kherson	Russia	For Imperial Russian Navy.
18 May	Hélène	Charmante-class frigate		Rochefort	France	For French Navy.
21 May	Mexicana	Goleta	Manuel Bastarrachea	San Blas	New Spain	For Spanish Navy.
24 May	Arkhangel Mikhail	Arkhangel Mikhail-class frigate	M. D. Portnov	Arkhangelsk	Russia	For Imperial Russian Navy.
24 May	Arkhangel Rafail	Arkhangel Mikhail-class frigate	M. D. Portnov	Arkhangelsk	Russia	For Imperial Russian Navy.
28 May	Garf Orlov	Aziia-class ship of the line	M. D. Portnov	Arkhangelsk	Russia	For Imperial Russian Navy.
24 May	Pamiat Evstafii	Iaroslav-class ship of the line	M. D. Portnov	Arkhangelsk	Russia	For Imperial Russian Navy.
28 May	Pompée	Téméraire-class ship of the line		Toulon	France	For French Navy.
31 May	Suffren	Téméraire-class ship of the line		Brest	France	For French Navy.
Unknown date	Grigory Velikiia Armenii	Fourth rate	A. P. Sokolov	Nicholaieff	Russia	For Imperial Russian Navy.
29 June	Mount Royal	Brig	Newland	Northam	Great Britain	For private owner.
7 July	General Green	Cutter		Philadelphia, Pennsylvania	United States	For Revenue Cutter Service.
10 July	Kazanskaya Bogoroditsa	Pyotr Apostol-class frigate	I. V. Dolzhnikov	Rogozhskaya	Russia	For Imperial Russian Navy.
16 July	Ioann Zlatoust	Fifth rate	Fursov	Taganrog	Russia	For Imperial Russian Navy.
20 July	Dauphin Royal	Océan-class ship of the line		Toulon	France	For French Navy.
23 July	Massachusetts	Schooner	Searle & Tyler	Newburyport, Massachusetts	United States	For Revenue Cutter Service.
July	Giasone	Cutter			Republic of Venice	For Venetian Navy.
15 August	Georgiana	Merchantman	W. Richards	Hythe	Great Britain	For St. Barbe & Co.
19 August	Pyrrhus	Third rate		Rochefort	France	For French Navy.
24 August	Scammel	Schooner			United States	For Revenue Cutter Service.
20 August	Minerve	Frigate		Naples	Kingdom of Naples	For Royal Neapolitan Navy.
30 August	Sibylle	Hébé-class frigate		Toulon	France	For French Navy.
10 September	Lougen	Lougen-class brig	Ernst Wilhelm Stibolt	Copenhagen	Denmark-Norway	For Dano-Norwegian Navy.
12 September	Reina María Luisa	Santa Ana-class ship of the line	Reales Astilleros de Esteiro	Ferrol	Spain	For Spanish Navy.
12 September	Thémistocle	Téméraire-class ship of the line		Lorient	France	For French Navy.
24 September	Sarpen	Lougen-class brig	Ernst Wilhelm Stibolt	Tønsberg	Denmark-Norway	For Dano-Norwegian Navy.
28 September	Rainha de Portugal	Third rate	Torcato Jose Clavina	Lisbon	Portugal	For Portuguese Navy.
28 September	Serpente do Mar	Sixth rate		Lisbon	Portugal	For Portuguese Navy.
29 September	Comet	Merchantman	Marmaduke Stalkart	Rotherhithe	Great Britain	For B. Daubuz.
September	Medusa	Palma-class Frigate	Girado Manao	Venice	Republic of Venice	For Venetian Navy.
1 October	Glommen	Lougen-class brig	Ernst Wilhelm Stibolt	Copenhagen	Denmark-Norway	For Dano-Norwegian Navy.
6 October	Princesa Carlota	Fifth rate		Bahia	State of Brazil	For Portuguese Navy.
25 October	Concorde	Nymphe-class frigate		Brest, France	France	For French Navy.
25 November	Sémillante	Sémillante-class frigate		Lorient	France	For French Navy.
28 November	Indian Trader	Merchantman	Barnard	Deptford	Great Britain	For John Brickwood.
9 December	Conquistador	Third rate		Carthagena	Spain	For Spanish Navy.
22 December	Ceres	Fifth rate	Landa Romero	Havana	(Spain) Cuba	For Spanish Navy.
22 December	Infante Don Pelayo	Third rate		Havana	(Spain) Cuba	For Spanish Navy.
Autumn	Margaret	Full-rigged ship		Boston, Massachusetts	United States	For James & Thomas Lamb, James Magee, Thomas Handasyd Perkins and Russell Sturgis.
Unknown date	Aleksei	Galley	I. Ivanov	Taganrog	Russia	For Imperial Russian Navy.
Unknown date	Amphitrite	Merchantman		Scarborough	Great Britain	For private owner.
Unknown date	L'Anacréon	Privateer		Dunkirk	France	For privateer.
Unknown date	Argus	Sloop		New London, Connecticut	United States	For Revenue Cutter Service.
Unknown date	Brilliant	Cutter	Nicholas Bools & William Good	Bridport	Great Britain	For Nicholas Bools and William Good.
Unknown date	Britannia	Merchantman		Plymouth	Great Britain	For Moore & Co.
Unknown date	Brunswick	West Indiaman		River thames	Great Britain	For T. Hibbert & Co.
Unknown date	Cadiz Packet	Cutter	Nicholas Bools & William Good	Bridport	Great Britain	For private owner.
Unknown date	Commerce	Merchantman		Liverpool	Great Britain	For G. Slater.
Unknown date	El Corso	Brig			Spain	For Spanish Navy.
Unknown date	Esmeralda	Frigate		Puerto Mahón	Spain	For Spanish Navy.
Unknown date	Goodwill	Lighter	John Nicholson	Chatham	Great Britain	For Royal Navy.
Unknown date	Grand Falconer	Cutter	Nicholas Bools	Bridport	Great Britain	For Duke of St Albans.
Unknown date	Guiscard	Third rate	Antonion Imbert	Castellamare del Golfo	Kingdom of Sicily	For Royal Sicilian Navy.
Unknown date	Harpooner	Whaler		Bristol	Great Britain	For J. Caves.
Unknown date	Hebe	Merchantman		Bristol	Great Britain	For Jacks & Co.
Unknown date	Indispensable	Merchantman		Bordeaux	France	For private owner.
Unknown date	Lady Harewood	West Indiaman	Randall & Brent	Rotherhithe	Great Britain	For Elliott & Co.
Unknown date	London Packet	Merchantman		River Thames	Great Britain	For John Toone.
Unknown date	Minerva	Merchantman		Galway	Ireland	For Burk & Co.
Unknown date	Rambler	Sloop	Nicholas Bools	Bridport	Great Britain	For Nicholas Bools.
Unknown date	Selby	Ship-sloop		Whitby	Great Britain	For Mr Woodcock.
Unknown date	St. Jean de Lone	East Indiaman			France	For private owner.
Unknown date	Sylph	Merchantman	Reynolds & Co	Whitby	Great Britain	For Nathaniel Langbourne, William Holt, and W. Reynolds.
Unknown date	Union	Slave ship		Liverpool	Great Britain	For George Hault, John Ratcliffe, and William Thompson.
Unknown date	Vigilant	Schooner			United States	For Revenue Cutter Service.
Unknown date	Westmoreland	Merchantman		River Thames	Great Britain	For private owner.
Unknown date	No.2 longboat	Longboat	Edward Sison	Sheerness Dockyard	Great Britain	For Royal Navy.
Unknown date	Name unknown	Merchantman			France	For private owner.
Unknown date	Name unknown	Merchantman			United States	For private owner.
Unknown date	Name unknown	Merchantman			United States	For private owner.
Unknown date	Name unknown	Merchantman			France	For private owner.
Unknown date	Name unknown	Merchantman			Spain	For private owner.
Unknown date	Name unknown	Merchantman		America		For private owner.
Unknown date	Name unknown	Merchantman			Spain	For private owner.
Unknown date	Name unknown	Brig		Nantes	France	For private owner.
Unknown date	Unnamed	Schooner			Russia	For Imperial Russian Navy.
