= United States Coast Guard Cutter =

Commissioned vessel of the U.S. Coast Guard

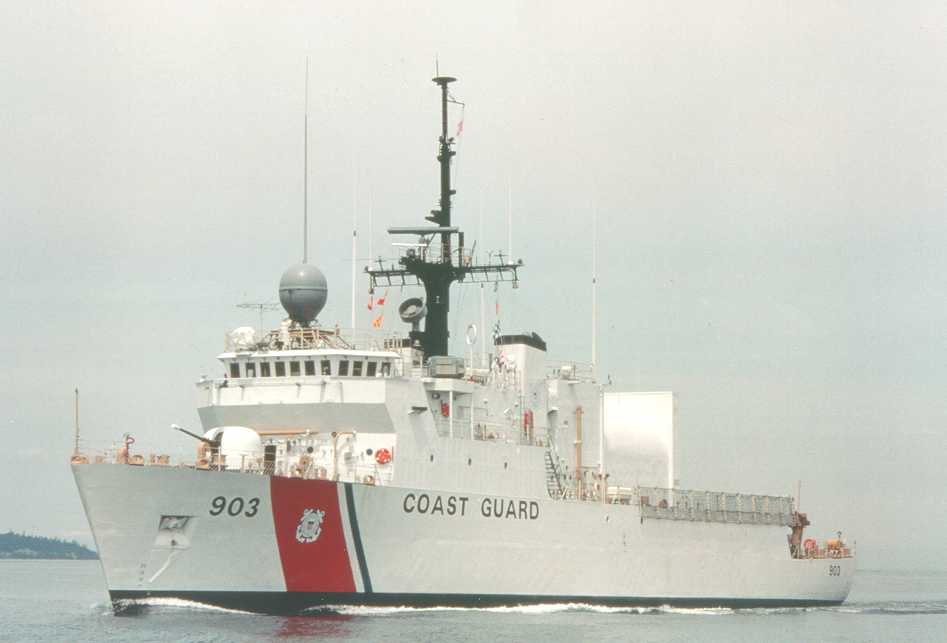
USCGC Harriet Lane, a Medium Endurance Cutter (WMEC)

United States Coast Guard Cutter is the term used by the U.S. Coast Guard for its commissioned vessels. They are 65 feet (19.8 m) or greater in length and have a permanently assigned crew with accommodations aboard. They carry the ship prefix USCGC.

== History of the USCG cutters ==
The Revenue Marine and the Revenue Cutter Service, as it was known variously throughout the late 18th and the 19th centuries, referred to its ships as cutters. The term is English in origin and refers to a specific type of vessel, namely, "a small, decked ship with one mast and bowsprit, with a gaff mainsail on a boom, a square yard and topsail, and two jibs or a jib and a staysail." With general usage, that term came to define any vessel of the United Kingdom's HM Customs and Excise and the term was adopted by the U.S. Treasury Department at the creation of what would become the Revenue Marine. Since that time, no matter what the vessel type, the service has referred to its vessels with permanently assigned crews as cutters.

=== First ten cutters ===
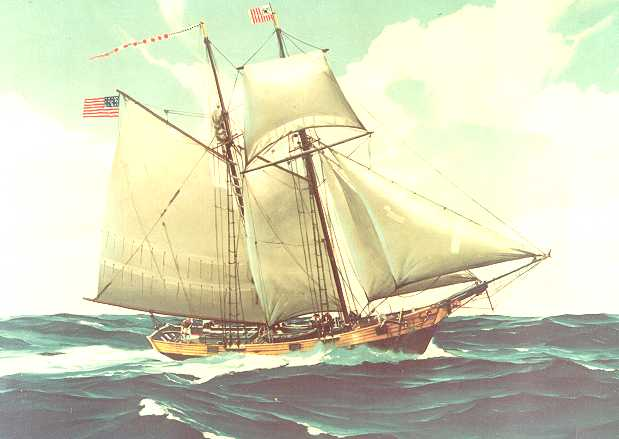
Painting of a Revenue Marine cutter (possibly USRC Massachusetts), not contemporary

In 1790, Congress authorized the Secretary of the Treasury, Alexander Hamilton, to create a maritime service to enforce customs laws (1 Stat. L. 145, 175; 4 August 1790). Alternatively known as the system of cutters, Revenue Service, and Revenue-Marine this service was officially named the Revenue Cutter Service (12 Stat. L., 639) in 1863. This service was placed under the control of the Treasury Department. The first ten cutters were:

- USRC Vigilant
- USRC Active
- USRC General Green
- USRC Massachusetts
- USRC Scammel
- USRC Argus
- USRC Virginia
- USRC Diligence
- USRC South Carolina
- USRC Eagle

== Current USCG cutter classes and types ==
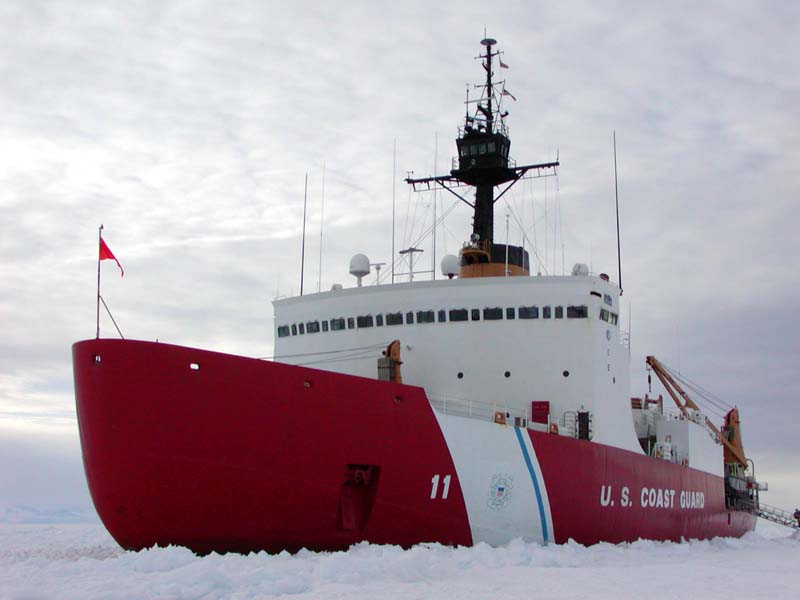
USCG icebreaker Polar Sea

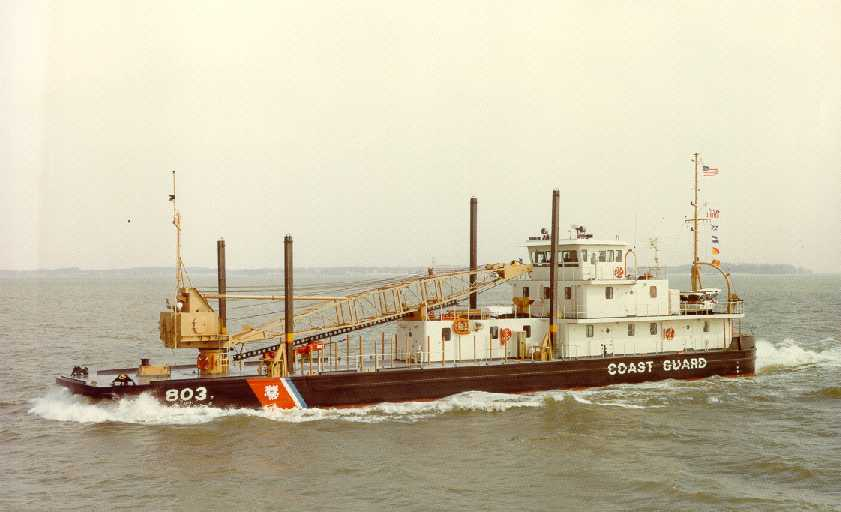
USCG Inland Construction Tender Saginaw

- 420' Icebreaker Healy (WAGB)
- 418' National Security Cutter (WMSL)
- 399' Polar-class icebreaker (WAGB)
- 360' Offshore Patrol Cutter (WMSM)
- 295' USCGC Eagle (WIX)
- 282' Edenton-class salvage and rescue ship, converted to Medium Endurance Cutter (WMEC)
- 270' and 210' Medium Endurance Cutter (WMEC)
- 240' USCGC Mackinaw (WLBB)
- 225' Seagoing Buoy Tender (WLB)
- 175' Coastal Buoy Tender (WLM)
- 160' Inland Construction Tender (WLIC)
- 154' Sentinel-class cutter (WPC)
- 140' Bay-class icebreaking tug (WTGB)
- 100' Inland Buoy Tender (WLI)
- 100' Inland Construction Tender (WLIC)
- 87' Marine Protector-class coastal patrol boat (WPB)
- 75' River Buoy Tender (WLR)
- 75' Inland Construction Tender (WLIC)
- 65' River Buoy Tender (WLR)
- 65' Inland Buoy Tender (WLI)
- 65' Small Harbor Tug (WYTL)

== Historic USCG cutter classes and types ==
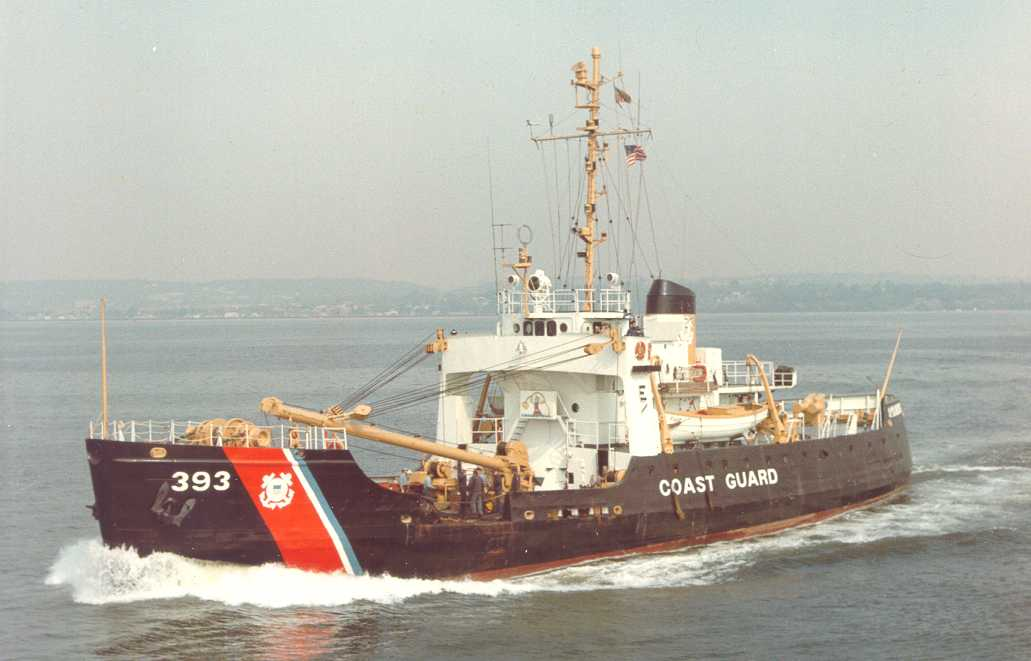
USCG Iris-class buoy tender Firebush

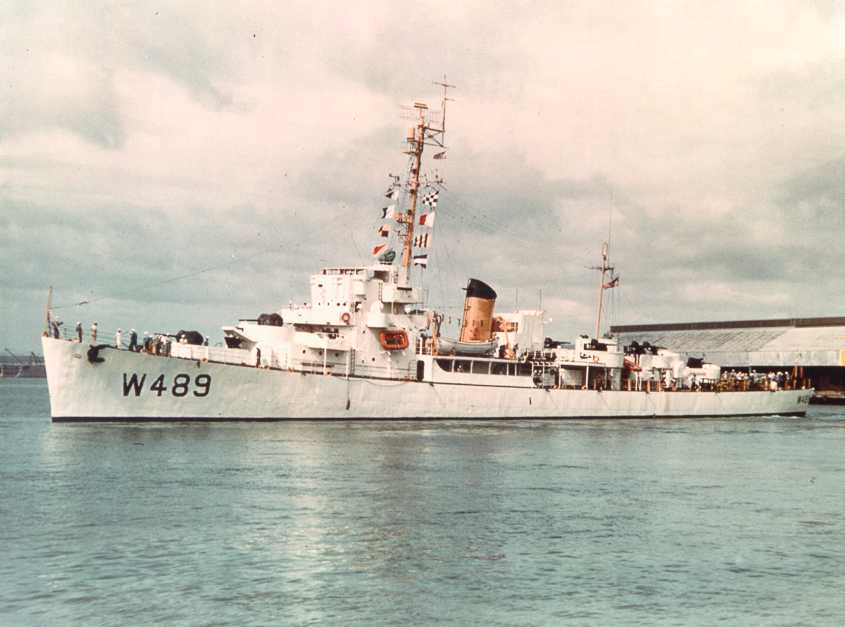
USCG Edsall-class cutter Durant

- 378' High endurance cutter (WHEC)
- 327' Treasury-class cutter (WPG)
- 311' Casco-class cutter (WAVP)
- 306' Edsall-class cutter (WDE)
- 269' Wind-class icebreaker (WAGB)
- 255' Owasco-class cutter
- 250' Lake-class cutter
- 240' Tampa-class cutter
- 230' Light Icebreaker, redesignated Medium Endurance Cutter (WMEC)
- 213' Diver-class rescue and salvage ship
- 213' Medium Endurance Cutter (WMEC)
- 205' Cherokee-class fleet tug, converted to (WAT) cutter, redesignated (WMEC)
- 180' Seagoing buoy tender (WLB)
- 180' Oceanographic vessel (WAGO)
- 165' Thetis-class patrol boat
- 165' Algonquin-class patrol boat
- 165' Tallapoosa-class boat
- 157' Red-class coastal buoy tender (WLM)
- 133' White-class coastal buoy tender (WLM)
- 125' Active-class patrol boat (WSC)
- 123' Patrol boat (Deepwater Modified) (WPB)
- 110' Island-class patrol boat (WPB)
- 110' Calumet-class harbor tug (WYTM)
- 110' Apalachee-class harbor tug (WYTM)
- 110' Manitou-class harbor tug (WYTM)
- 95' Cape-class cutter (WPB)
- 82' Point-class cutter (WPB)

== See also ==
- List of equipment of the United States Coast Guard
- United States Ship
