= La Diligence =

La Diligence can refer to:

- La Diligence (comics), an album in the Lucky Luke comics serie
- La Diligence (restaurant), Michelin starred restaurant in Beek, Netherlands

== See also ==
- Diligence (disambiguation)
