= De Vlijt =

De Vlijt (English The Diligence) is a name used for windmills in the Netherlands.

- De Vlijt, Diever, a windmill in Drenthe
- De Vlijt, Geffen, a windmill in North Brabant
- De Vlijt, Koudum, a windmill in Friesland
- De Vlijt, Marle, a windmill in Overijssel
- De Vlijt, Meppel, a windmill in Drenthe
- De Vlijt, Wageningen, a windmill in Gelderland
- De Vlijt, Wapenveld, a windmill in Gelderland
- De Vlijt, Zuidwolde, a windmill in Drenthe
