= Diligence (disambiguation) =

Diligence is a behavior or work ethic with a belief that work is good in itself; also considered a virtue.

Diligence may also refer to:

- Due diligence, a legal concept
- Diligence (Scots law), a legal process in Scots law
- Operational due diligence, review process for potential mergers and acquisitions
- Management due diligence, an evaluation of each individual's effectiveness in contributing to the organization's strategic objectives

Ships:

- RFA Diligence (A132), a fleet repair ship of the Royal Fleet Auxiliary
- USCGC Diligence (WMEC-616), a U.S. Coast Guard medium endurance cutter
- USRC Diligence, one of the first ten cutters operated by the United States' Revenue Cutter Service
- ST Diligent, a tug operated by the Admiralty between 1947 and 1961.

== See also ==
- Diligence (vehicle), a type of four-wheeled enclosed coach
- De Vlijt (disambiguation) (Dutch for "The Diligence"), a name given to some windmills in the Netherlands
- La Diligence (restaurant), a Michelin-starred restaurant in Beek, Netherlands
- La Diligence (comics), an album in the Lucky Luke comics series
