= First ten Revenue Service cutters =

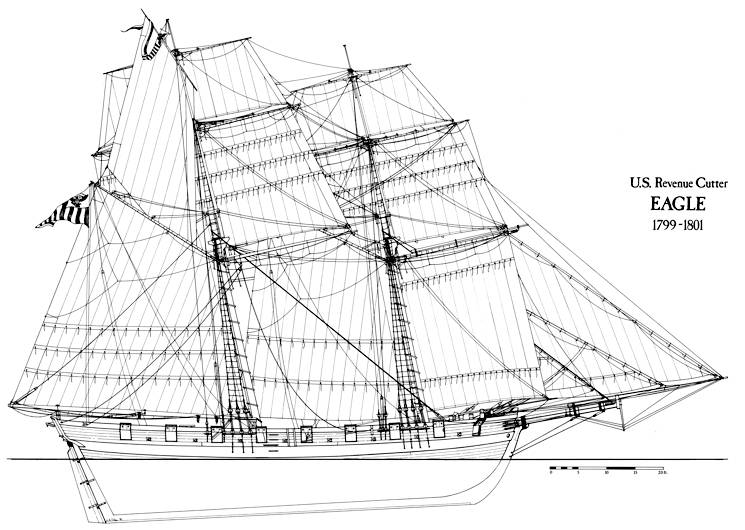
- USRC Eagle

Class overview
- Operators: U.S. Revenue-Marine (later the Revenue Cutter Service)
- In service: July 1791 - 1804
- In commission: April 1791-1793 - 1792-1804
- Completed: 10
- Retired: 10

General characteristics
- Type: Revenue Marine cutters
- Displacement: 35-55 tons
- Length: ~50 ft
- Beam: ~25 ft
- Draft: ~ 6 ft 6 in
- Propulsion: Sail
- Armament: Muskets, pistols, swivel cannon on some

The first ten Revenue Service cutters were ten oceangoing cutters built at the behest of the 1st United States Congress in the early 1790s to crack down on smuggling. Since the United States Navy had at the time not yet been formed (it was established in 1798), these ten cutters of the newly formed Revenue-Marine therefore represent the United States Government's first official "armed force afloat", as well as being the first seagoing vessels to operate with what would later become the United States Coast Guard.

== Need for the Revenue Service ==
Immediately after the American Revolutionary War the newly established United States was struggling to stay financially afloat. National income was desperately needed, and a great deal of this income came from import tariffs. Because of rampant smuggling, the need was immediate for strong enforcement of tariff laws, and on August 4, 1790 the United States Congress, urged on by Secretary of the Treasury Alexander Hamilton, created the Revenue-Marine, later renamed Revenue Cutter Service in 1862. It would be the responsibility of the new Revenue-Marine to enforce the tariff and all other maritime laws.

== Earlier revenue vessels ==
There were a number of vessels that served on an "ad hoc" basis as revenue boats in the period prior to Congress' authorization to build the ten cutters. Some were operated by the various states during the Confederation Period while others were operated by the federally appointed customs collectors in the ports after the formation of the government in 1789. These "federal" revenue boats and craft varied in type and size, such as Philadelphia collector Sharp Delany's "barge with sails," that served before, during, and well after the General Green entered service in the waters around Philadelphia. But such craft were not seagoing vessels capable of sailing well away from a protected harbor, as the cutters were specifically designed to do.

== Duties of the Revenue cutters ==
Although little documentation exists regarding any of the first ten cutters' activities - most of the correspondence and logbooks from the era were destroyed by fire when the British Army burned Washington, D.C. during the War of 1812 and another fire in the Treasury Department in 1833 - these government vessels undoubtedly carried out a myriad of tasks. Many of these duties were spelled out in letters from the Secretary of the Treasury, Alexander Hamilton, to the various collectors of customs, who were in direct charge of the cutters and their crews. The duties specifically assigned to the cutters and their crews as legislated by Congress and expounded by Hamilton included:

- Boarding incoming and outgoing vessels and checking their papers (ownership, registration, admeasurement, manifests, etc.);
- Ensuring that all cargoes were properly documented;
- Sealing the cargo holds of incoming vessels;
- Seizing those vessels in violation of the law.

They were also tasked with a number of other duties that were not related to protecting the revenue. These included:

- Enforcing quarantine restrictions established by the federal, state or local governments;
- Charting the local coastline;
- Enforcing the neutrality and embargo acts;
- Carrying official (and unofficial) passengers;
- Carrying supplies to lighthouse stations;
- Other duties as assigned by the collector.

Their primary purpose, however, was to protect the revenue of the United States by deterring smuggling. That meant sailing out of the port to which they were assigned and intercepting vessels before they came too close to the shore. It was here, well out of the harbor but within sight of the coast, that smugglers unloaded part of their cargoes into smaller "coaster" vessels or directly onshore to avoid customs duties. The collectors usually had smaller boats that could check vessels as they sailed into port. Therefore, these ten cutters were not harbor vessels; they were designed to sail out to sea, survive in heavy weather, and sail swiftly so that they might overtake most merchant vessels. They were the United States' first line of defense against attempts to circumvent duties, the major source of income during this period.
