= Embuscade =

Embuscade may refer to:

- Embuscade, the name of several French Navy ships
- "Embuscade," a song by Phoenix on the 2000 album United
