= Ambuscade =

An ambuscade or ambush is a surprise attack carried out by combatants waiting in a concealed position.

For warships with this name, see:

- British Royal Navy - HMS Ambuscade
- French Navy - French ship Embuscade
