= John Tobin (1809 ship) =

History

United Kingdom
- Name: John Tobin
- Builder: Kingston-on-Hull
- Launched: 1809
- Fate: Disappeared after 28 November 1821

General characteristics
- Tons burthen: 458, or 461 (bm)
- Complement: 1809:30; 1812:20
- Armament: 1809:14 × 18-pounder carronades + 2 swivel guns; 1812:12 × 18-pounder carronades

John Tobin was a ship launched in 1809 at Hull. In 1810 she recaptured a British vessel and in November 1812 she repelled an attack by an American privateer in a single ship action. From 1816 John Tobin made three voyages to India, sailing under a license from the British East India Company (EIC). She then sailed to Calabar, West Africa. She left there on 28 November 1821 and was never heard of again.

== Career ==
John Tobin first appeared in Lloyd's Register (LR) in the volume for 1810.

Captain Lawrence Hall acquired a letter of marque on 30 December 1809.

Year	Master	Owner	Trade	Source
1810	L.Hall	Tobin & Co.	Hull–St Croix	LR

On 19 January 1810 as Hart, Omay, master, was returning to Britain from Malta Or vice-versa), a privateer captured her at 49°14′N 17°7′W. John Tobin recaptured Hart, which returned to Liverpool on 8 February. Prize money for Hart's recapture was paid to John Tobin's master and crew in October 1811.

In mid-1810 John Tobin carried sugar, rum, and slaves from St Croix to the West Indies.

Year	Master	Owner	Trade	Source
1811	L.Hall	Tobin & Co.	Liverpool–Savannah	LR
1812	L.Hall; G.Howard	Tobin & Co.	Liverpool–Jamaica	LR

Captain George Howard acquired a letter of marque on 7 February 1812.

On 25 November 1812 John Tobin, Howard, master, arrived at Bahia from London. She had repelled on 21 November, at 8°10′S 31°30′W, an attack by an American privateer that supposedly had fitted out at Pernambuco four days before the encounter with John Tobin. The privateer was Alfred, of twenty 9-pounder guns (including two stern chasers). There were no British casualties. (Note: American sources give Alfred 16 guns and a complement of 130 men. HMS Epervier captured Alfred, of 216 tons (bm) on 23 February 1814, without a fight.)

John Tobin arrived safely back in Liverpool on 19 April 1813, having sailed from Bahia on 17 February 1813. She was carrying cotton, cow hides, etc. The Underwriters of Liverpool presented Captain Howard with a silver cup in appreciation of his "gallant and seamanlike conduct in defending his ship".

In May 1815 John Tobin arrived back at Liverpool from Barbados with sugar, cotton, ginger, arrowroot, old copper, tamarinds, and cocoa nuts.

On 16 August 1815 John Tobin, Hall, master, was at 41°N 58°W on her way to New York. She had suffered some damage to her sails and other trifling damage. She was reported to have arrived in New York with Howland, master. She returned from New York with turpentine, tar, staves, and cotton.

In 1813 the EIC had lost its monopoly on the trade between India and Britain. British ships such as John Tobin were now free to sail to India or the Indian Ocean under a license from the EIC.

Year	Master	Owner	Trade	Source
1815	G.Howard	Tobin & Co.	Liverpool–New York; Liverpool–Calcutta	LR

In early October 1816 John Tobin, Keenan, master, was at 37°S 5°E on her way from Liverpool to Calcutta. She arrived at Calcutta on 2 January 1817. While there she received repairs and new copper sheathing. She left Bengal on 13 August. On 14 November she was at the Cape of Good Hope on her way back to Liverpool; she left on 19 November. She arrived back at Liverpool on 10 January 1818.

Year	Master	Owner	Trade	Source & notes
1818	G.Howard; Keenan	Tobin & Co.	Liverpool–Calcutta	LR; damages repaired 1818

In 1818 John Tobin, A. Keenan, master, sailed from Liverpool for Bombay. On 28 April 1819 John Tobin had returned and was off Liverpool; she had sailed from Bengal on 5 December 1818.

Year	Master	Owner	Trade	Source & notes
1819	Keenan; S.Lyon	Tobin & Co.	Liverpool–Calcutta	LR; damages repaired 1818
1820	S.C.Lyon	Hibberson & Co.	Liverpool–Calcutta	LR; damages repaired 1818

On 13 August 1820 John Tobin was at Saint Helena on her way back from Bengal. She had sailed from the Sand Heads on 16 May. she arrived in Liverpool on 18 October. Her cargo consisted of wine, sugar, indigo, rice, sago, and saltpetre, etc.

Year	Master	Owner	Trade	Source & notes
1821	S.C.Lyon; J.Bean	Hibberson & Co.	Liverpool–Calcutta; Liverpool–Africa	LR; damages repaired 1818

== Fate ==
On 28 November 1821 John Tobin sailed from Calabar for Liverpool. She was never heard from again.
