= Hopley Yeaton =

First commissioned officer of the U.S. Revenue Cutter Service

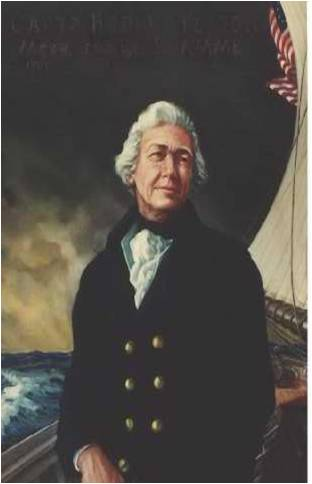
- Born: 1739 Somersworth, Province of New Hampshire, British America
- Died: May 12, 1812 (aged 73) Lubec, Maine, United States
- Allegiance: United States
- Branch: Revenue Cutter Service
- Known for: First naval commissioned officer under the U.S. Constitution.

Hopley Yeaton (1739 – May 12, 1812) was the first officer commissioned (March 21, 1791) under the Constitution of the United States by George Washington into the Revenue-Marine (later known as the Revenue Cutter Service), one of the forerunners of the modern-day United States Coast Guard. The Coast Guard was created when Congress merged the Revenue Cutter Service with the U.S. Lifesaving Service in 1915.

== Naval service ==
Born in Somersworth, New Hampshire, Yeaton served as a lieutenant in the Continental Navy on board the frigates USS Raleigh and USS Deane. After his commissioning in the newly formed Revenue-Marine he was appointed by President George Washington as the commanding officer of the Revenue-Marine cutter Scammel. Yeaton probably brought along his slave, Senegal Thompson, during Scammel's patrols, as this practice was permitted by the Treasury Department at this time. Yeaton fired three of his crew after their first few months of service. The men had been in "open rebellion" over issues of pay and daily food rations—particularly after they learned that their fellow sailors aboard USRC Massachusetts received more and varied foods each day than they did.

== Retirement ==
Yeaton resigned his commission on September 11, 1809. He suffered from poor health and retired to a farm at Eastport, Maine at the age of seventy. (Note: Kroll claims that Yeaton retired to north Lubec, Maine) He was active in community affairs and assisted in the incorporation of the town of Lubec. He died at the age of seventy three.

== Monuments ==
=== Captain Hopley Yeaton Memorial ===
The tomb of Hopley Yeaton lies on the grounds of the U.S. Coast Guard Academy in New London, Connecticut. He was originally buried in Lubec, Maine, but in 1975 his burial site was threatened by modernization. The Corps of Cadets sailed the barque Eagle to Lubec, where his remains were exhumed and laid to rest at the Academy.

=== Hopley Yeaton Walk of History Plaque ===
On August 2, 2008, in a bid to help affirm Grand Haven, Michigan, as "Coast Guard City USA", the Walk of History was revealed to the public at Coast Guard Station Grand Haven. The first point of history on the walk was the Hopley Yeaton Plaque, which was ceremonially unveiled by Vice Adm. Clifford Pearson and Andrew Yeaton, a direct descendant of Hopley Yeaton.

== Notes ==
=== References ===
- Evans, Stephen H. (1949). The United States Coast Guard 1790–1915: A Definitive History. Naval Institute Press, Annapolis, Maryland. No ISBN
- Kern, Florence (1975). Hopley Yeaton's U.S. Revenue Cutter Scammel, 1791-1798. "The most effectual check to the mischiefs. [sic]". Alised Enterprises, Washington, DC. No ISBN
- King, Irving H. (1989). The Coast Guard Under Sail: The U.S. Revenue Cutter Service, 1789–1865. Naval Institute Press, Annapolis, Maryland. ISBN 978-0-87021-234-5.
- Kroll, C. Douglas (2010). A Coast Guardsman's History of the U.S. Coast Guard. Annapolis, Maryland: Naval Institute Press. ISBN 978-1-59114-433-5.
- Noble, Dennis L. (1990). Historical Register U.S. Revenue Cutter Service Officers, 1790–1914. Coast Guard Historian's Office, U.S. Coast Guard Headquarters, Washington, DC No ISBN.
- Semrau, Bill (October 2024). "Remembering Captain Yeaton's Exhumation" (PDF). Coast Guard Academy Alumni Bulletin.
