= Westmoreland (1791 ship) =

History

Great Britain
- Name: Westmoreland
- Builder: Thames
- Launched: 1791
- Fate: Last listed in 1814

General characteristics
- Tons burthen: 173, or 180, or 186 (bm)
- Complement: 1803: 40; 1805:80
- Armament: 1803: 12 × 6&9-pounder guns; 1805:16 × 9-pounder guns + 24-pounder carronades; 1806:10 × 6-pouner guns + 2 × 12-pounder carronades

Westmoreland was launched on the Thames in 1791. She made two voyages as a slave ship in the triangular trade in enslaved people. Between these voyages she cruised as a privateer for some months. She then traded between Britain and the Mediterranean. She was last listed in 1814.

== Career ==
Although she was launched in 1791, Westmoreland first appeared in Lloyd's Register (LR) only in 1801.

Year	Master	Owner	Trade	Source & notes
1801	J.Bridson	Every & Co.	Greenock–Jamaica	LR
1802	J.Bridson; P.Cormack	Every & Co. Walter & Co.	Greenock–Jamaica; Liverpool–Africa	LR

1st voyage transporting enslaved people (1802–1804): Westmoreland sailed from Liverpool on 14 October 1802. In 1802, 155 vessels sailed from English ports, bound on voyages to acquire and transport enslaved people; 122 of these vessels sailed from Liverpool.

Westmoreland acquired captives in the Gold Coast region and arrived with 149 slaves at Trinidad on 22 November 1803. War with France had resumed while she was on her voyage and Captain Peter Cormack received a letter of marque on 25 July 1803. She left Trinidad on 9 April 1804 and arrived back at Liverpool on 25 May. She had left Liverpool with 24 crew members and she suffered three crew deaths on the voyage.

On her return Westmoreland became a privateer, before reverting to the slave trade.

Year	Master	Owner	Trade	Source & notes
1805	P.Cormack; Goodall	Walton & Co. Taylor & Co.	Liverpool–Africa; Liverpool – a cruise	LR
1806	T.Goodall; H.Fryer	Walton & Co. Taylor & Co.	Liverpool – a cruise Liverpool–Africa	LR

Privateer: Captain Thomas Goodall acquired a letter of marque on 11 January 1805. Westmoreland, Goodall, master, captured the polacre Conception at 36°50′N 19°40′W. Conception had been sailing from Vera Cruz to Spain with a cargo of 130 tons of sugar, a quantity of dye wood, and 68,000 dollars. Conception arrived at Liverpool on 28 February. As Conception sailed for Liverpool she left Westmoreland in chase of another Spanish vessel.

In late March of early April Lloyd's List reported that a French privateer captured Westmoreland, Goodall, master, after a long engagement. A week and a half later Lloyd's List reported that the French privateer Bon had captured a different Westmoreland.

In June, Westmoreland, Goodall, master, recaptured Eliza and sent her to Liverpool. Eliza had been sailing from Waterford to Newfoundland when a Spanish privateer had captured her off Cape Clear.

2nd voyage transporting enslaved people (1806–1807): Captain Henry Tryer sailed from Liverpool on 6 March 1806. Westmoreland acquired captives at Lagos Onim. She arrived at Berbice on 8 August with 218 captives. She sailed from Berbice on 3 February 1807 and arrived back at Liverpool on 16 April. She had left Liverpool with 33 crew members and she suffered nine crew deaths on the voyage.

Year	Master	Owner	Trade	Source & notes
1808	J.Mason; Robinson	James & Co.	Liverpool–Africa; Liverpool–Messina	LR; large repair 1808
1814	Robinson	James & Co.	Liverpool–Malta	LR; large repair 1808

== Fate ==
Westmoreland was last listed in 1814.
