= Hebe (1791 ship) =

History

Great Britain
- Owner: Jacks & Co.
- Builder: Bristol
- Launched: 1791
- Captured: c.1801

General characteristics
- Tons burthen: 233 (bm)
- Complement: 1794:18; 1799:40; 1800:45
- Armament: 1794:10 × 6-pounder guns + 2 swivel guns; 1799:18 × 4&6 *12-pounder guns; 1800:18 × 4-pounder guns + 4 swivel guns

Hebe was a ship built at Bristol in 1791. She traded with the West Indies until a French privateer captured her in 1801.

Captain William Grumly received a letter of marque on 8 January 1794.

In 1796, her master was Richard Honneywill, and in 1797, Thomas Hatcher. Neither appears to have sailed under a letter of marque.

Captain Levers Alleyne (or Alleyne), received a letter of marque on 6 September 1799. He returned from Jamaica in 1800.

Captain John Smith received a letter of marque on 3 July 1800. He then sailed for Jamaica in September.

Lloyd's List reported on 20 January 1801 that a French privateer had captured Hebe, Smith, master, from Bristol to Jamaica, and taken her into Guadeloupe.
