= De Vlijt, Meppel =

Dutch windmill

De Vlijt
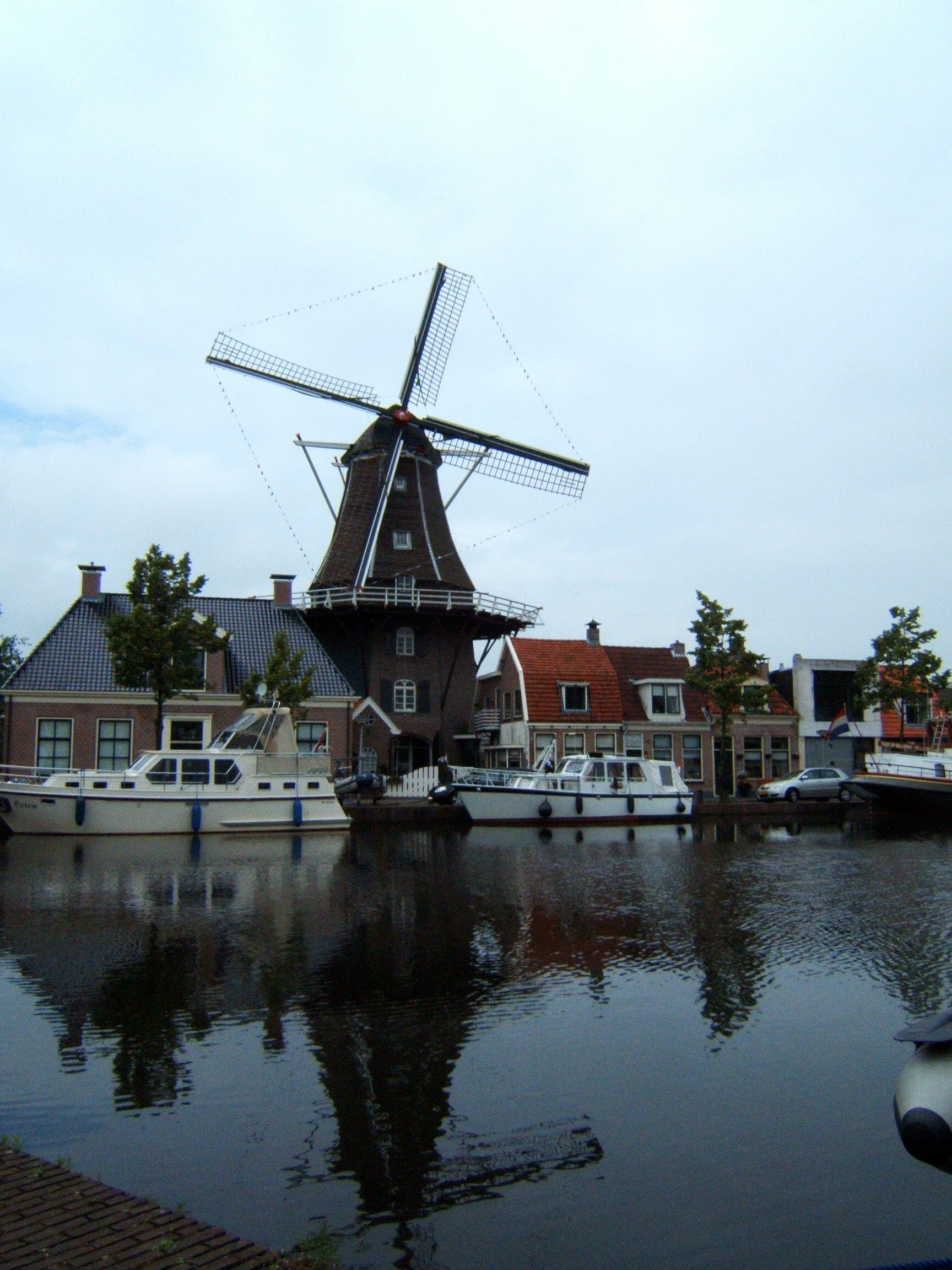

Origin
- Mill name: De Vlijt
- Mill location: Sluisgracht 20, 7941 BW, Meppel
- Coordinates: 52°41′44″N 6°11′10″E
- Operator(s): Stichting Stadskorenmolen De Vlijt
- Year built: 2001

Information
- Type: Smock mill
- Storeys: Two-storey smock
- Base storeys: Four-storey base
- Smock sides: Eight sides
- No. of sails: Four sails
- Type of sails: Common sails
- Winding: Tailpole and winch

De Vlijt (English: The Diligence) is a smock mill in Meppel, Netherlands. It was built in 2001.

== History ==
De Vlijt was built in 2001 on the base of a tower mill which had been taken out of use in 1933 and demolished in 1965. The tower had been built on an octagonal brick base which was left standing. The base is currently used as living accommodation and office space.

== Description ==
De Vlijt is what the Dutch describe as an "achtkante stellingmolen". It is a smock mill with a stage. It has four-storey brick base and the stage is at third-floor level, 9.10 metres (29 ft 10 in) above ground level. The mill is winded by tailpole and winch. The four common sails have a span of 21.80 metres (71 ft 6 in). The cast-iron windshaft was made by Fabrikaat Gieterij Hardinxveld in 2001. The mill has no internal gears or machinery.

== Public Access ==
De Vlijt is not open to the public.
