= Minerva (1791 ship) =

British slave ship and merchantman (1791–1813)

History

Great Britain
- Name: Minerva
- Launched: 1791, Galway
- Captured: 8 January 1814
- Fate: Last listed in 1813

General characteristics
- Tons burthen: 210, or 212 (bm)
- Complement: 40
- Armament: 1797: 8 × 4-pounder guns; 1799:18 × 6&9-pounder guns; 1800:18 × 6&9-pounder guns; 1813:2 × 9-pounder guns

Minerva was launched in 1791 at Galway. She then traded widely, particularly as a West Indiaman. Between 1800 and 1804 she made two voyages from Bristol as a Guineaman. That is, she was a slave ship, carrying enslaved peoples in the Trans-Atlantic slave trade. She then returned to trading with the West Indies. A United States privateer captured her in 1814.

== Career ==
Minerva first appeared in Lloyd's Register (LR) in 1792.

Year	Master	Owner	Trade	Source & notes
1792	Satchwell	Burk & Co.	Cork–Virginia	LR
1794	Satchwell; S.Lee	Burke & Co.	Cork–Virginia	LR; part old materials
1797	S.Lee; A.Robertson	Burke&Co. Dixon	London–Norway; London–Tobago	LR
1799	R.Dixon	T.Dixon	London–Leghorn	LR
1800	R.Dixon; J.Kennedy	T.Dixon; Anderson	London–Leghorn; Bristol–Jamaica	LR; small repairs 1799

Although the voyage data in Lloyd's Register does not indicate it, Minerva next made two voyages as a slave ship.

1st voyage transporting enslaved people (1800–1802): Captain John Kennedy acquired a letter of marque on 9 April 1800. He sailed from Bristol on 5 May. In 1800, 133 vessels sailed from English ports, bound for the trade in enslaved people. Most of these vessels sailed from Liverpool; only three sailed from Bristol.

Minerva acquired her captives on the Windward Coast. She delivered her captives to Demerara and then sailed on to Grenada. Apparently she landed 223 captives in all. She returned to Bristol on 27 January 1802.

Year	Master	Owner	Trade	Source & notes
1802	J.Kennedy; J.Silcocks	Anderson	Bristol–Jamaica	LR; small repairs 1799

2nd voyage transporting enslaved people (1802–1804): Captain Joseph (or John) Silcock sailed from Bristol on 5 December 1802 bound for the Gold Coast. In 1802, 155 vessels sailed from English ports, bound for the trade in enslaved people. Most of these vessels sailed from Liverpool; again, only three sailed from Bristol.

Minerva started acquiring captives on 31 January 1803. On 13 May 1803 Lloyd's List (LL) reported that Minerva, Silcock, master, had arrived at Africa. The same report mentioned that Minerva, Coley master, had also arrived there.

Minerva, Silcock, master, sailed to the leeward and returned to the Cape Coast Castle on 23 February. She again sailed to leeward on 5 November. She arrived at Demerara on 25 February 1804, and there landed 218 captives. Advertisements described the slaves as being "Chantee" (Ashantee?), Coromantee, and Fantee. The agents for the sale were Walcott & Forrester and the sale was to begin on 2 March. Minerva arrived back at Bristol on 6 August.

Year	Master	Owner	Trade	Source and notes
1805	J.Silcocks; T.C. Williams	Anderson	Bristol–Barbados	LR; small repairs 1799 and good repair 1802
1806	Williams	Anderson	Bristol–Barbados; London	LR; small repairs 1799 and good repair 1802
1807	Williams	Anderson	London–Barbados	LR; small repairs 1799 and good repair 1802

Lloyd's Register continued to carry Minerva with unchanged information to 1813. However, the Register of Shipping carried two Minervas from 1809, one launched in 1791 at Galway with Bishop, master and owner, and trade London–West Indies, and a second, launched in 1791 in Ireland, with Williams, master, Anderson, owner, and trade London–Barbados.

Year	Master	Owner	Trade	Source and notes
1809	Bishop	Captain & Co.	London–West Indies	Register of Shipping (RS); small repair 1802 and repairs 1805
1810	Williams	Anderson	London–Barbados	Register of Shipping (RS)

The Register of Shipping carried both vessels to 1813 with unchanged information.

== Fate ==
Neither register carried Minerva in 1814.

On 8 January 1814 the United States privateer Comet captured a vessel, believed to be Minerva, of London. Minerva was close to Barbados when she was captured. (Note: The privateer was probably the highly successful Comet.)

Although Lloyd's Register carried 109 vessels named Minerva, only the Minerva of this article had London–Barbados as its trade. Also, no other Minerva showed a trade of London–West Indies.
