= Sharp Delany =

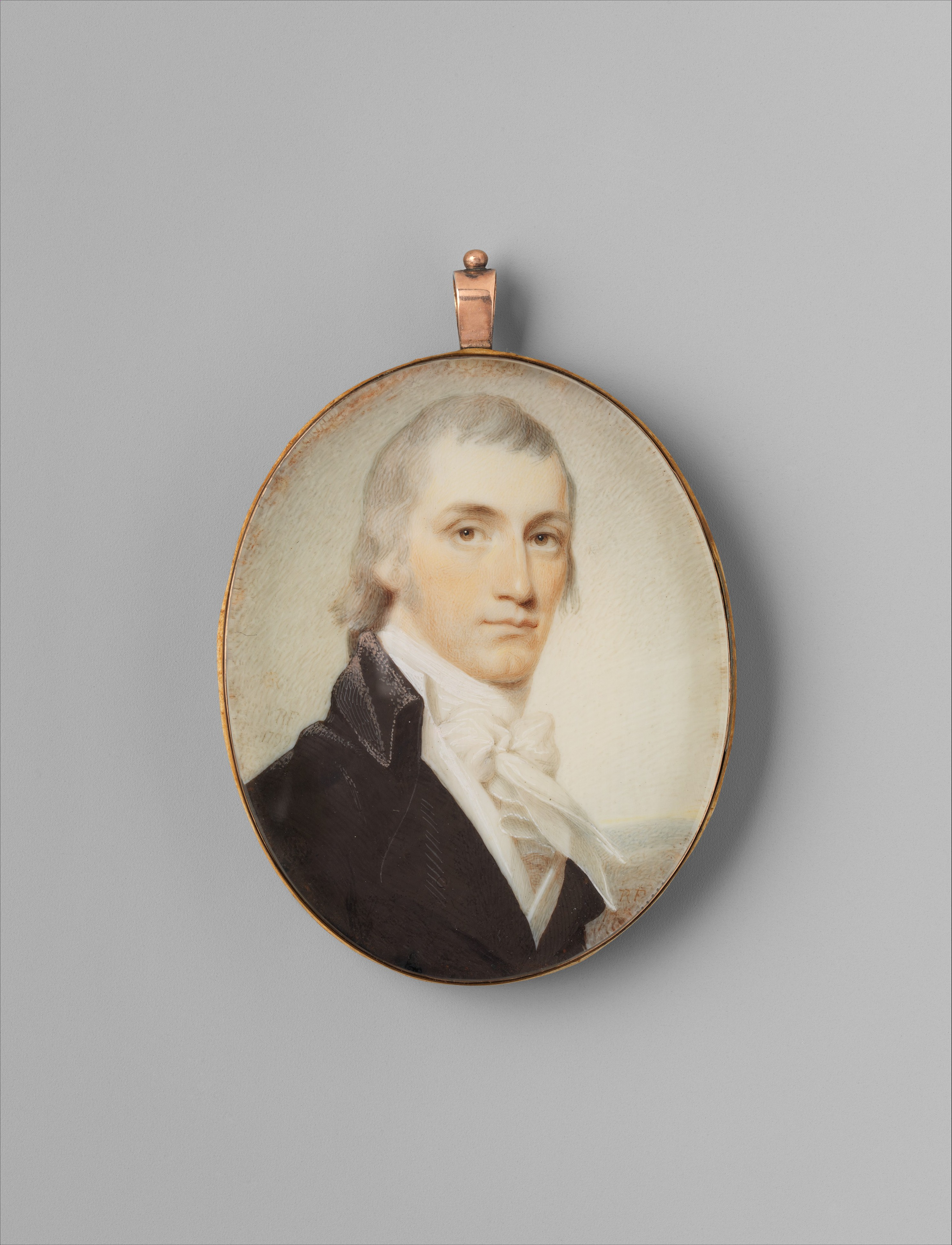
- Born: Ireland
- Died: May 13, 1799; Philadelphia, Pennsylvania
- Burial place: St. Peter's Episcopal Church Yard, Philadelphia, Pennsylvania
- Military career
- Allegiance: United States of America
- Branch: Continental Army
- Service years: 1776-1779
- Rank: Colonel
- Commands: 2nd Battalion Pennsylvania Militia
- Conflicts: American Revolutionary War

Sharp Delany (c. 1739-1799), was a colonel in the American Revolutionary War a legislator and the first Collector of Customs in Philadelphia, appointed by George Washington.

== Biography ==
Sharp Delany’s place of birth is in dispute. Often stated to have been born in County Monaghan, Ireland, Sharp Delany was likely born in Queen’s County, Ireland (present day County Laois). Ballyfin, Queen’s County, was the home of his paternal grandfather, Martin Delany, and his father, Daniel Delany, who also resided in Clonin, Queen’s County. Also, Sharp Delany’s maternal grandfather, Isaac Sharp, resided in Killinure, Queen’s County. Sharp Delany’s maternal great-grandfather was the noted Dublin Quaker Anthony Sharp, for whom Sharp was named.

Sharp Delany’s date of immigration to the United States is uncertain. Among the first records of him in America is his September 7, 1763, marriage to Margaret Robinson in the Trinity Episcopal Church of Philadelphia. By about 1764, he had established himself as a druggist in Philadelphia in partnership with his brother, William. Sharp was elected to the American Philosophical Society in 1774. In 1775-6, he was an active member of committees in favor of American independence and later subscribed five thousand pounds to supply the army.

He was a deputy to the Provincial Convention in January, 1775, and to the Provincial Conference in June of the same year. In June, 1776, he raised a company of militia, of which he was captain, and in 1779 was colonel of the 2d Pennsylvania Battalion. Colonel Sharp Delany was a personal friend of George Washington and a constant associate of General Anthony Wayne, who made Colonel Delany one of the executors of his will. After the revolution, he was a member of the legislature of Pennsylvania, and a member of the Society of the Cincinnati.

On March 15, 1784, Sharp Delany was appointed Collector of Customs under the State of Pennsylvania, and was the first to be appointed to that position at the Federal level by George Washington in 1789, a position he held until his death in 1799.

In October 1789, Secretary of the Treasury Alexander Hamilton asked the various collectors of customs about the need for boats to protect and ensure revenue collection. Sharp Delany replied that he was already using a vessel for that purpose and fully endorsed the concept. In April 1790, Hamilton asked Congress to create a Revenue Marine service with a fleet of ten small cutters. On 4 August 1790, now celebrated as the Coast Guard’s birthday, Congress passed Hamilton’s Revenue Cutter Bill. Sharp Delany oversaw the construction of one of these first ten cutters, the USRC General Green. Since Sharp Delany was evidently the first United States official to employ a vessel for the purpose of enforcing customs laws, a 1976 Naval Institute Proceedings article suggested he is the father of the Coast Guard.

Colonel Sharp Delany was a cousin of Marine Commandant Anthony Gale and was likely the person who recommended Gale for his commission as a Second Lieutenant, which he received only fifteen days after Congress reestablished the Marines on July 11, 1798. Following Sharp Delany’s death, his son, Thomas R. Delany, witnessed Commandant Gale’s naturalization papers in 1801.

Many of the writings of Sharp Delany survived, including his Revolutionary War orderly book, U.S. Customs letter book, and correspondence with George Washington, Thomas Jefferson, Alexander Hamilton, and General Anthony Wayne, which offer insight into the American Revolution and the birth of the United States.

Sharp Delany died on May 13, 1799, and is buried in St. Peter's Episcopal Church Yard in Philadelphia along with his wife, Margaret, and several of their children.

=== Ancestry ===
Ancestors of Sharp Delany

Martin Delany
Daniel Delany
James Albin
Barbara Albin
Anne
Sharp Delany
Thomas Sharp
Anthony Sharp
Elizabeth Hookam
Isaac Sharp
Thomas Crabb
Anne Crabb
Sarah
Rachel Sharp
Margaret Braithwaite

=== Bibliography ===
- Ashmead, Harry Graham (1902). Tracing the Descent of the Children of Robert and Phoebe Ann (Delany) Wetherill. Chester, PA: John Spencer.
- Bronson, Rev. William White (1879). The Inscriptions in St. Peter's Church Yard, Philadelphia. Camden, New Jersey: Sinnickson Chew.
- Campbell, John (1892). History of the Friendly Sons of St. Patrick and of the Hibernian Society. Philadelphia: Hibernian Society.
- Carrigan, William (1905). The History and Antiquities of the Diocese of Ossory, Volume II. Dublin: Sealy, Bryers & Walker.
- Cullen, Charles T. (1990). The Papers of Thomas Jefferson: 1 January to 31 May 1792. Princeton, NJ: Princeton University Press.
- Egle, William Henry; Clarence M. Busch (1890). Pennsylvania in the War of the Revolution: Associated Battalions and Militia, 1775-1783. Harrisburg, PA: E. K. Meyers.
- Hoth, David R. (1987). The Papers of George Washington, Presidential Series: April–June 1789. Charlottesville, VA: University Press of Virginia.
- Krietemeyer, George E (2000). The Coast Guardsman's Manual, Ninth Edition. Annapolis, Maryland: US Naval Institute. ISBN 978-1-55750-468-5.
- Martin, John Hill (1883). Martin's Bench and Bar of Philadelphia. Philadelphia: Rees Welch & Co.
- Nelson, Paul David (1985). Anthony Wayne, Soldier of the Early Republic. Bloomington, IN: Indiana University Press.
- "Pennsylvania Magazine of History and Biography, Volume XX". The Historical Society of Pennsylvania. 1896.
- "Pennsylvania Magazine of History and Biography, Volume XXXII". The Historical Society of Pennsylvania. 1908.
- Simpson, Henry (1859). The Lives of Eminent Philadelphians Now Deceased. Philadelphia: William Brotherhead.
- Syrett, Harold Coffin (1979). The Papers of Alexander Hamilton. New York: Columbia University Press.
