= USRC Scammel (1791) =

U.S. revenue cutter

History

United States
- Name: Scammel
- Namesake: Alexander Scammell, Army Adjutant General
- Owner: Department of the Treasury
- Operator: Revenue-Marine
- Builder: Joseph Whipple
- Laid down: 15 February 1791
- Launched: 24 August 1791
- Commissioned: 1791
- Decommissioned: 1798
- Fate: Sold 16 August 1798

General characteristics
- Displacement: 51 85/95 tons
- Length: 57.6 ft
- Beam: 15.8 ft
- Draft: 6.5 ft
- Propulsion: Sail
- Complement: 4 officers
- Crew: 4 enlisted, 2 boys
- Armament: 10 muskets, 20 pistols

USRC Scammel was one of the first ten cutters operated by the United States Revenue-Marine (later to become the U.S. Coast Guard). Her original name was Ferret.

Scammel was named by Alexander Hamilton for Adjutant General Alexander Scammell of New Hampshire, but one notes that Hamilton was rather careless about spelling - as were many men of letters of that time. This was the second cutter to receive the name of a Revolutionary hero but with an incorrect spelling (USRC General Green was the first, the correct spelling is Greene).

== Description ==
The surveyor who examined Scammel prior to her entering service noted that "she had two masts, one deck, a short quarter deck, low waists with rails fore and aft, and was schooner rigged."

== Operational service ==
As in the case of so many of these cutters, the Scammel's monthly journals have been lost. Nevertheless, some information has survived. She cruised from Nantucket to Passamaquoddy and on occasion did sail in tandem with the cutter Massachusetts. Scammel seized the Lucy of Stamford for "illegal registration" which was eventually condemned and sold, along with her cargo for $750. The money was awarded to Hopley Yeaton, master of Scammel.

Overall it would seem that Yeaton and his cutter carried out their duties effectively. The local collector, under whose authority Scammel sailed, Joseph Whipple, informed Hamilton that:

The services performed by the Cutter I conceive to have been very important to the safety and preservation of the Revenue. The Coast which is assigned to her, that of New Hampshire and the District of Maine, extending nearly 300 miles, many of which afford convenient places for fraudulent practices which have been checked by the attention and vigilance of the officers of the Scammel. The services for the year past consisted in cruising the aforementioned Coast, in entering and examining the Vessel's papers, instructing the ignorant coasters, and in bringing to justice those who break or evade the laws. Instances of contraventing of the laws have been discovered and prosecuted and some of them failed by the unaccountable determination of the court.

She was sold on 16 August 1798 to Clement Jackson for $565.

== Crew ==
Hopley Yeaton, Master, 1791-1798. Yeaton probably brought along his slave, Senegal, during the Scammel's patrols as was this practice was permitted by the Treasury Department at this time.

John Flagg, First Mate, 1791-1791.
John Parrott, Second Mate, 1791-1791.
Samuel Hobard, Third Mate, 1791-1791.

Yeaton fired three of his crew after their first few months of service. The men had been in "open rebellion" over issues of pay and daily food rations - particularly after they learned that their fellow sailors on board the Massachusetts received more and varied foods each day than they did.

Benjamin Gunnison, First Mate, 1792-1798.
John Adams, second mate, 1792-1796.

Sam Odiorne, second mate, 1796-1798.

In 1796, the enlisted crew were:

Danzil Donnavin, Seaman.
James Smith, Seaman.
Thomas Fowler, Seaman.
George Yeaton, Seaman (he was Yeaton's son).

Joseph Call, Boy.
Stephen Weeks, Boy.
