= De Vlijt, Wageningen =

Windmill in Wageningen, Netherlands

De Vlijt
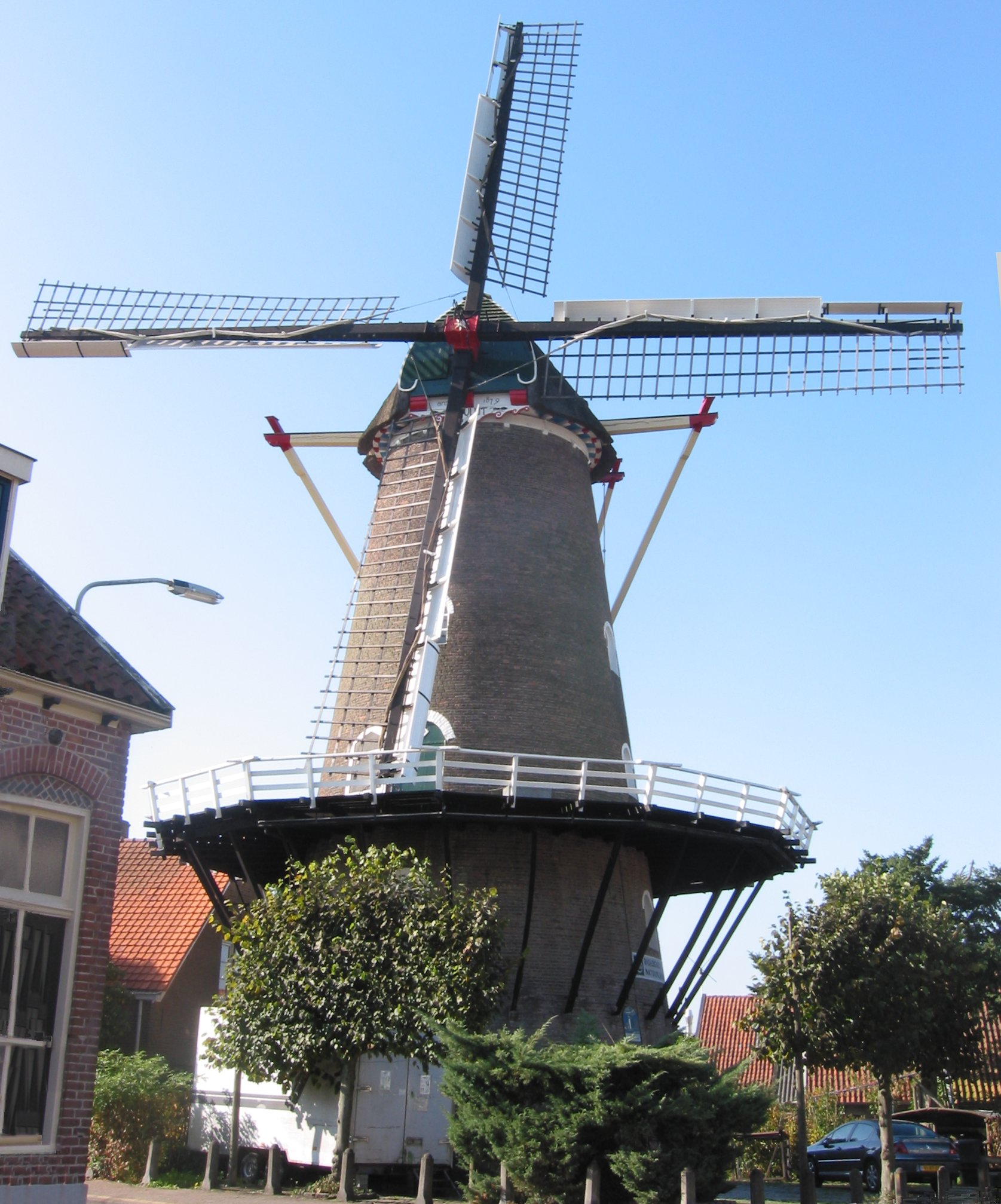
- Front view of the mill, 2005

Origin
- Mill name: De Vlijt
- Mill location: Harnjesweg 54; Wageningen, Netherlands
- Coordinates: 51.970833°N 5.671111°E
- Operator(s): Municipality of Wageningen
- Year built: 1879, 1978

Information
- Purpose: Gristmill
- Type: Windmill, Smock mill
- No. of sails: Four
- Type of sails: Common sails
- Other information: Rijksmonument (38212); Database of Mills; De Hollandsche Molen

De Vlijt is a windmill located on the Harnjesweg 54 in Wageningen, Netherlands. Built in 1879 it has been in use ever since as a gristmill. The mill was built as a Smock mill and its four sails have a span of 22.30 meters. The mill was bought by the local government and restored in 1978, and it was listed as a national heritage site (nr 38212) in 1970.

== Gallery of images ==
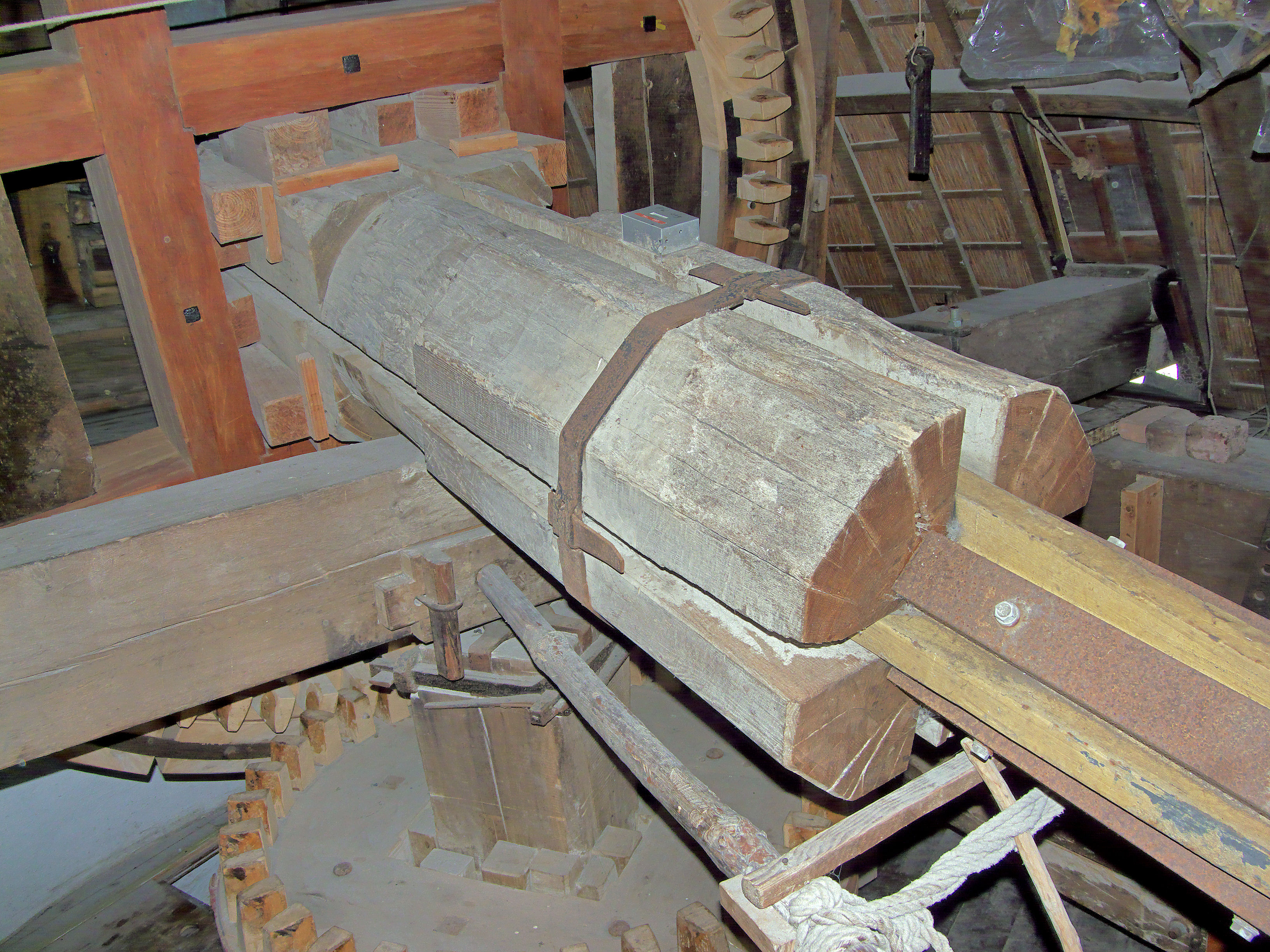
Windshaft

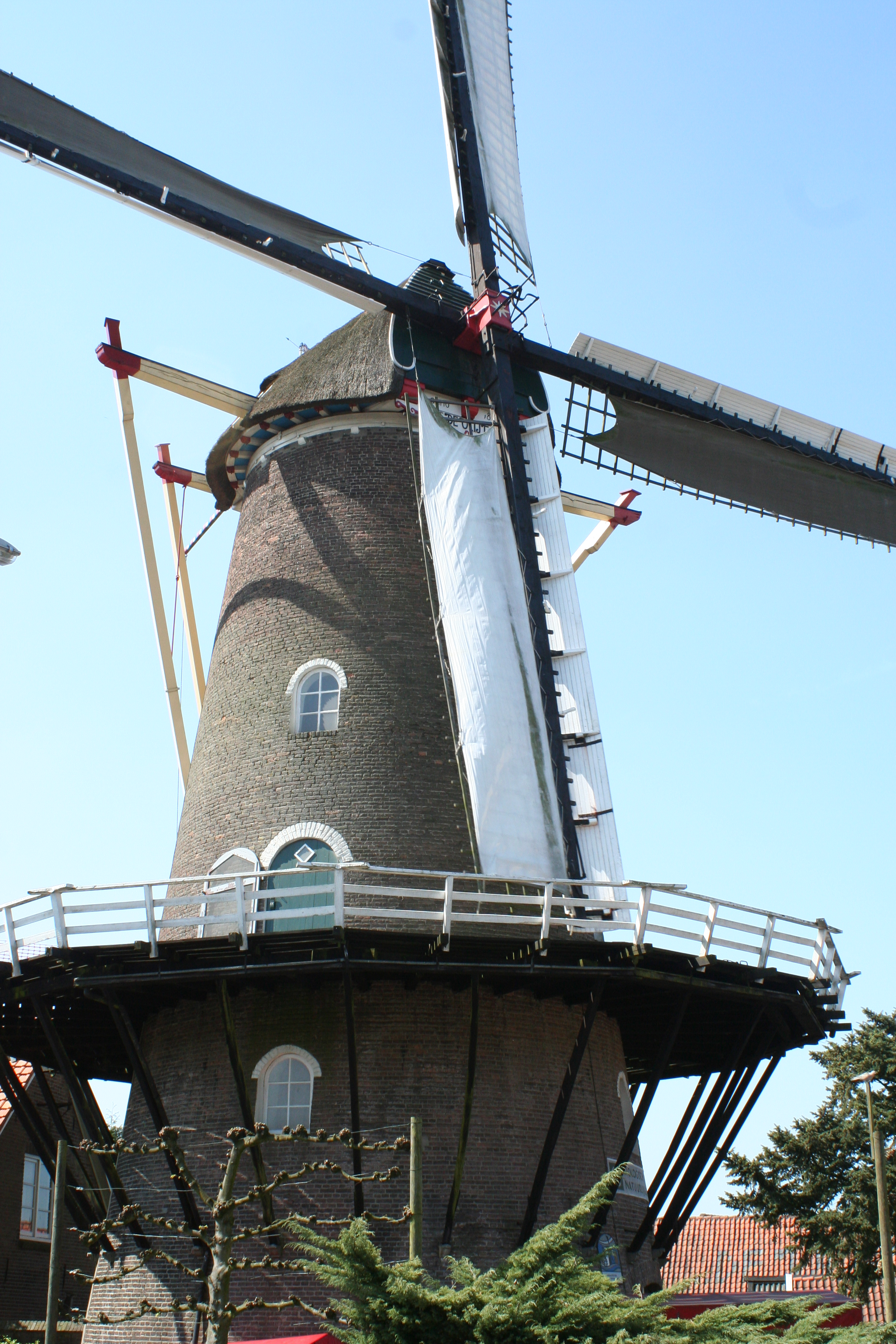
View of the mill, 2009

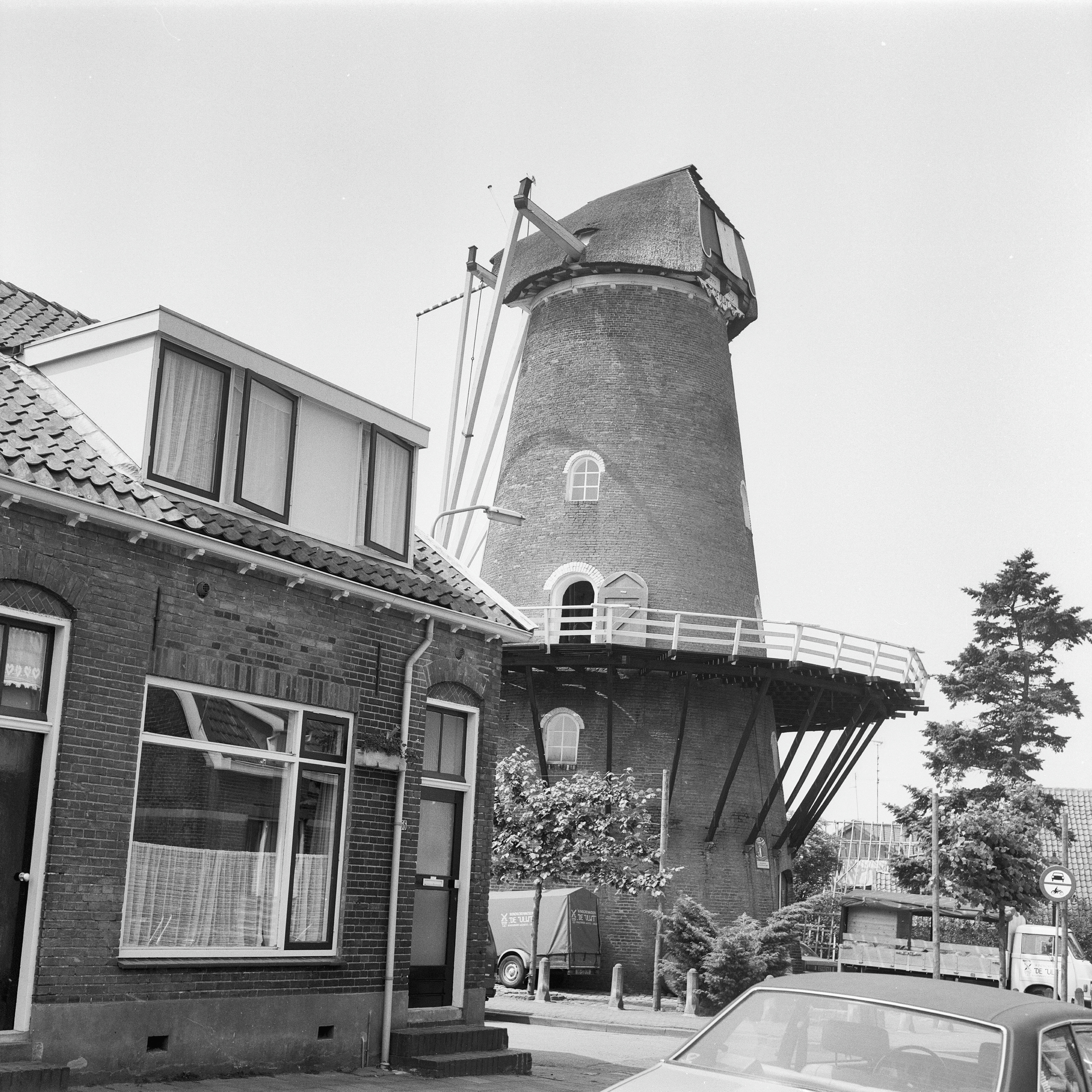
Without sails, 1985
