= Sarah (1798 ship) =

British slave ship (1798–1805), built in Spain

History

Spain
- Launched: 1791
- Captured: 1798

Great Britain
- Name: Sarah
- Acquired: 1798 by purchase of a prize
- Captured: 1805

General characteristics
- Tons burthen: 190 (bm)
- Propulsion: Sail
- Complement: 1800:20; 1803:25; 1805:30
- Armament: 1800:14 × 6-pounder guns; 1803:14 × 6-pounder guns; 1805:14 × 6-pounder guns

Sarah was launched in Spain in 1791, presumably under another name. The British captured her c.1798. She made five voyages as a Liverpool-based slave ship in the triangular trade in enslaved people before a Spanish privateer captured her in 1805 on her sixth voyage. On her fifth voyage Sarah had captured two French slave ships at Loango.

== Career ==
Dolben's Act mandated the maximum number of captives a vessel could carry without penalty, given her burthen. At a burthen of 190 tons, the cap for Sarah would have been 317, a larger number than she ever carried.

1st voyage transporting enslaved people (1799–1800): Captain John Neal sailed from Liverpool on 1 January 1799. In 1799, 156 vessels sailed from English ports to acquire captives from Africa and transport them to the West Indies; 134 of these vessels sailed from Liverpool.

Sarah gathered her slaves at Malembo and delivered 295 to Kingston, Jamaica, on 30 August. She left Kingston on 10 October and arrived back at Liverpool on 1 December.

Sarah entered the Register of Shipping in 1800 with J. Niel, master, J. Ward, owner, and trade Liverpool–Africa. Captain John Neal acquired a letter of marque on 18 February 1800.

2nd voyage transporting enslaved people (1800–1801): Captain Neal sailed from Liverpool on 13 March 1800, bound for West Central Africa and St Helena. In 1800, 133 vessels sailed from English ports to acquire captives from Africa and transport them to the West Indies; 120 of these vessels sailed from Liverpool.

Sarah arrived at Kingston on 28 September and landed 212 captives. She left Kingston on 27 November and arrived back at Liverpool on 18 January 1801. She had left with 31 crew members and suffered one crew death on the voyage.

3rd voyage transporting enslaved people (1801–1802): Captain Neal sailed from Liverpool on 16 April 1801. In 1801, 147 vessels sailed from English ports to acquire captives from Africa and transport them to the West Indies; 122 of these vessels sailed from Liverpool.

Sarah delivered an estimated 280 captives to Suriname on 26 September. She left Suriname on 28 November and arrived back at Liverpool on 17 January 1802.

4th voyage transporting enslaved people (1802–1803): Captain Henry Kennedy sailed from Liverpool on 29 April 1802. This voyage took place entirely during the Peace of Amiens so he sailed without a letter of marque. In 1802, 155 vessels sailed from English ports to acquire captives from Africa and transport them to the West Indies; 122 of these vessels sailed from Liverpool.

Sarah acquired captives at Loango and delivered 222 to Havana on 22 November. She arrived back at Liverpool on 20 March 1803. She had left Liverpool with 25 crew members and she suffered one crew death on the voyage.

War with France had resumed on 18 May 1803 and Captain Henry Kennedy acquired a letter of marque on 23 May.

5th voyage transporting enslaved people (1803–1805): Captain Kennedy sailed from Liverpool on 19 June 1803. In 1803, 99 vessels sailed from English ports to acquire captives from Africa and transport them to the West Indies; 83 of these vessels sailed from Liverpool.

Sarah again acquired captives at Loango. On 14 August 1803 Kennedy and Sarah captured two French slave ships: Éole and Télémaque. Sarah acquired 180 captives from Télémaque, and some from Éole. (Note: Éole was a brig of 10431/94 tons (bm), with a crew of 21 men and two boys, under the command of Captain Pierre-Aimé-Louis Vesneau. She sailed from Nantes on 13 March 1803. Captain Vesneau died of tetanus in Loango Roads on 22 July. Télémaque was a brig of 9253/94 tons (bm), and the former British merchant vessel Talbot, sold at Havre on 7 October 1800. She had a crew of 22 men and 2 boys, under the command of Noël-Joseph Agasse. She left Havre on 27 January 1803, bound for the coast of Angola where she intended to acquire 200 captives to take to Martinique. Between 30 January and 10 March she was at Cherbourg, where two crew members deserted. Télémaque arrived at Loanga in the first week of June.)

Lloyd's List reported on 20 December 1803 that Telemaque had arrived at Barbados. She was a prize to Sarah, Kennedy, master, of Liverpool, which had captured Telemaque as Telemaque was coming from Africa.

Lloyd's List reported in March 1803 that Sarah's prize, probably Éole, had arrived at Demerara.

Sarah arrived at the Bahamas on 24 April 1804 and apparently landed nine captives there. She then sailed to New Orleans, where she landed 210. She left New Orleans on 3 January 1805 and arrived back at Liverpool on 5 March. She had left Liverpool with 31 crew members and she suffered five crew deaths on the voyage.

Lloyd's Register for 1805 showed Sarah's master as H. Kenedy, changing to G. Best, and her owner as Ward & Co. Captain George Best acquired a letter of marque on 14 May 1805.

6th slave voyage (1805): Captain Best sailed from Liverpool on 13 June 1805.

Sarah started acquiring captives at Loango 24 September. She left Africa on 29 September.

== Fate ==
Lloyd's List reported on 4 March 1806 that Sisters, McBride, master, and Sarah, Best, master, had been captured on the coast of Africa and carried into the River Plate. Lloyd's Register for 1807 carried the annotation "capt." by her name.

Reportedly, Sarah arrived at Montevideo on 13 November 1805 and landed 166 captives. She had left Liverpool with 30 crew members and arrived at Montevideo with 32.

In 1805, 30 British ships in the triangular trade were lost, of which 13 were lost on the coast of Africa, and 11 were lost in the Middle Passage as they were sailing from Africa to the West Indies. War, not maritime hazards nor slave resistance, was the greatest cause of vessel losses among British slave vessels.
