= Enterprize (1796 ship) =

History

Great Britain
- Name: Enterprize
- Builder: America
- Launched: 1791
- Acquired: 1796
- Fate: Wrecked 1801

General characteristics
- Tons burthen: 221 (bm)
- Complement: 1796:18; 1798:15; 1800:20
- Armament: 1796:10 × 6&4-pounder guns; 1798:10 × 6&4-pounder guns; 1800:10 × 6&4-pounder guns

Enterprize was launched in America in 1791, possibly under another name. Between 1797 and 1799 she made two complete voyages as a slave ship. She was wrecked in 1801 at Suriname after having disembarked the slaves she had carried there on her third slave trading voyage.

== Career ==
Enterprize first appeared in Lloyd's Register (LR) in 1797.

Year	Master	Owner	Trade	Source & notes
1797	Jackson	G.Case	Liverpool–Africa	LR; repairs 1796

1st slave voyage (1797–1798): Captain Edward Jackson acquired a letter of marque on 12 December 1796. Enterprize sailed from Liverpool on 17 February 1797. She acquired her slaves at Ambriz and arrived at Demerara on 11 December with 357 slaves. She arrived back at Liverpool on 23 April 1798. She had left Liverpool with 28 crew members and she suffered one crew death on her voyage.

Lloyd's List reported in April 1798 that Enterprize, Jackson, master, had run into a frigate while Enterprize was sailing from Demerara to Liverpool, and would have to stop in Tortola to repair.

Year	Master	Owner	Trade	Source & notes
1798	E.Jackson; John Brine	G.Case	Liverpool–Africa	LR; repairs 1796

2nd slave voyage (1798–1799): Captain John Brine acquired a letter of marque on 25 June 1798. Enterprize sailed from Liverpool on 15 August, bound for West Africa. She acquired slaves at Angola and sailed from Africa on 14 April 1799. She arrived at St Kitts on 13 May with 348 slaves. She sailed from St Kitts on 16 June, stopped in Antigua, and arrived back at Liverpool on 22 August. She had left Liverpool with 36 crew members and had suffered nine crew deaths on her voyage.

Year	Master	Owner	Trade	Source & notes
1800	John Brine; H.Booth	G.Case	Liverpool–Africa	LR; repairs 1796

3rd slave voyage (1800–1801): Captain Henry Booth acquired a letter of marque on 11 April 1800. Enterprize sailed from Liverpool on 6 May. She acquired her slaves at Bonny and arrived at Suriname on 15 June 1801 with 232 slaves.

== Loss ==
Lloyd's List reported that Enterprize, from Africa, had been wrecked at Surinam. Her crew were rescued. She had run aground. Part of her cargo was brought back to Suriname.
