= USRC Vigilant (1791) =

History

United States
- Name: Vigilant
- Operator: Revenue Cutter Service
- Launched: March 1791
- Commissioned: 1791
- Decommissioned: 14 November 1798
- Fate: Sold, 14 November 1798

General characteristics
- Displacement: 35 Tons
- Length: 48 ft (15 m) (keel)
- Beam: 17 ft (5.2 m)
- Draft: 6 ft 6 in (1.98 m)
- Propulsion: Sail
- Complement: 4 officers
- Crew: 4 crewmen, 2 boys
- Armament: Probably ten muskets with bayonets; twenty pistols; two chisels; one broad axe.

Vigilant (launched 1791) was one of the original ten cutters employed by the Federal government of the United States which made up the Revenue Marine, or Revenue Cutter Service, later to become the United States Coast Guard.

== Operational history ==
Vigilant was one of the first ten revenue cutters authorized by Congress and was probably the first cutter launched. She was not, however, the first to enter into active service. The first mention of her on an actual patrol as a revenue cutter was not until 23 December 1791 when her crew boarded a Royal Navy schooner as it entered the port of New York, the Vigilant's homeport. Patrick Dennis was appointed the master of the new revenue cutter on 6 October 1790 and oversaw her construction. He served as her commanding officer until his death, of unknown causes, on 9 February 1798.

Little documentation survives regarding her service life but she apparently carried out her assigned duties as described above along the Hudson River as far as Albany, in New York Harbor itself, along the coastline of New York and New Jersey, and "through Hell Gate to Long Island Sound except Sagg harbor." There is some remaining information regarding her role in a celebrated naval engagement between the French frigate Ambuscade and the Royal Navy frigate Boston during the long war between England and France. On a summer day in 1793 Vigilant was patrolling off Sandy Hook when a frigate, flying French colors, ordered the cutter to hove to. Two American prisoners on board the frigate described what happened:

The New York revenue cutter, Captain Dennis, was brought to by the Boston. The frigate under French colours, and the crew having the national cockade in their hats. Capt. Cortnay, in French, asked Capt. Dennis, who was not to be deceived, answered that he conceived the Boston looked more like an English armed vessel than any on the coast. Upon this Capt. Courtnay enquired what French vessels were in New York. Captain Dennis answered that the principal was the Ambuscade frigate: well, says Courtnay tell Capt. Bompard that I had come all the way from Halifax on purpose to take the Ambuscade and I shall be very happy to see her out of the way. Shall I tell him that? yet asked Dennis; Yes, to be sure answered the first lieutenant. Capt. Dennis delivered the message to Bompard at the Coffee House.

Bompard accepted the British offer and sailed off to battle Boston. After breaking off the engagement in which Boston was damaged more severely and her captain killed, Ambuscade sailed back to New York Harbor.

Vigilant was sold at auction on 14 November 1798 for £348 after it was determined that she was too small and too lightly armed to carry out her assigned duties in the busiest port of the new nation. There is no further documentation regarding her ultimate fate.
