= De Vlijt, Diever =

Dutch windmill

De Vlijt
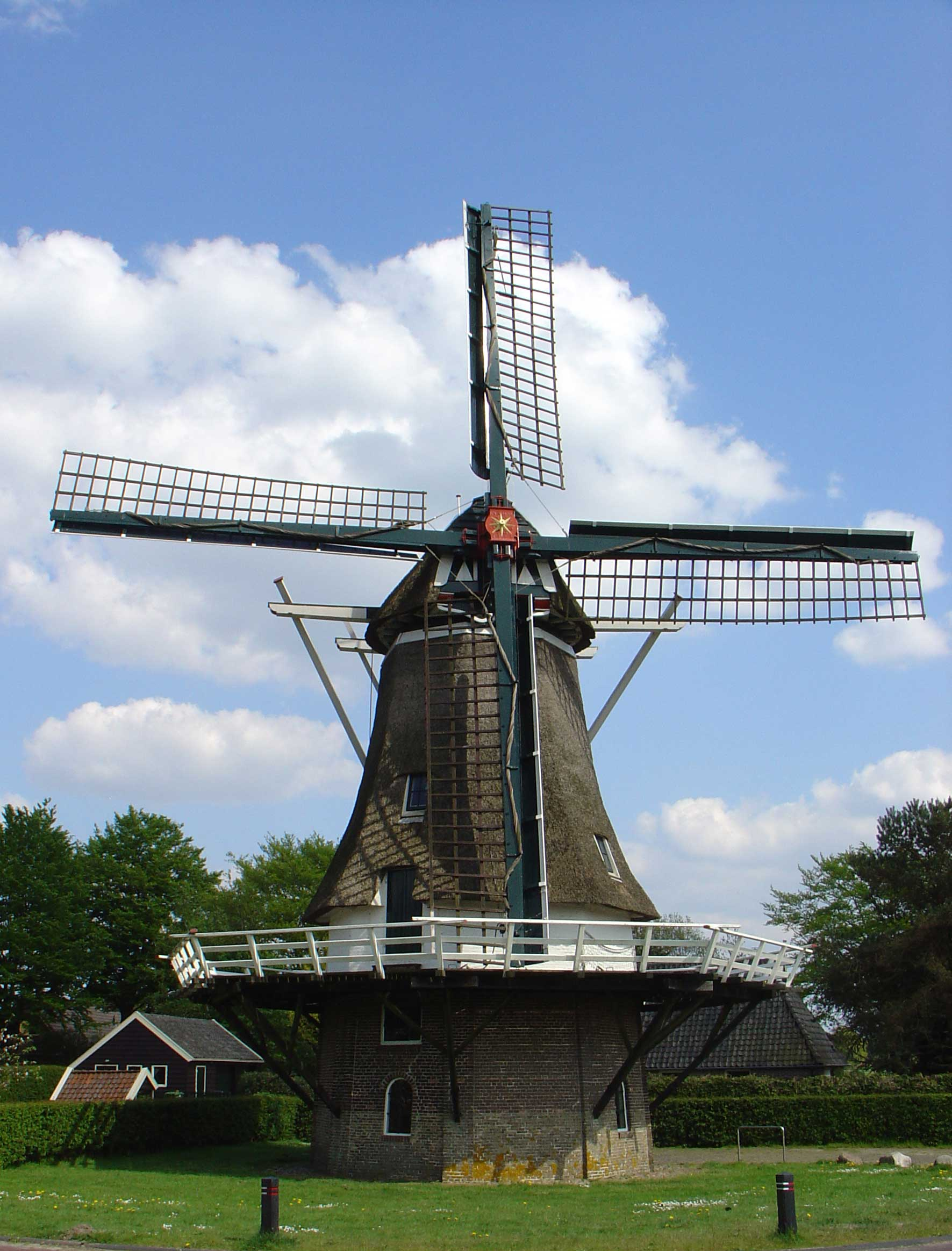

Origin
- Mill name: De Vlijt
- Mill location: Oldendiever 35, 7981 LT, Diever
- Coordinates: 52°51′06″N 6°18′49″E
- Operator(s): Gemeente Westerveld
- Year built: 1882

Information
- Purpose: Corn mill
- Type: Smock mill
- Storeys: Two-storey smock
- Base storeys: Two-storey base
- Smock sides: Eight sides
- No. of sails: Four sails
- Type of sails: Common sails
- Windshaft: Cast iron
- Winding: Tailpole and winch
- Auxiliary power: Oil engine (formerly) / 4,5 kW three-phase electric motor
- No. of pairs of millstones: Two pairs, one on wind power, one electric
- Size of millstones: 1.30 metres (4 ft 3 in) and 1.10 metres (3 ft 7 in)

De Vlijt (English: The Diligence) is a smock mill in Diever, Netherlands. It was built in 1882. The mill is listed as a Rijksmonument, number 12907.

== History ==
A smock mill on this site, built in 1878 for F. Westerling, burnt down in 1881. A replacement was built by Diever millwright Rispens, incorporating parts from a drainage mill that formerly stood at Lemmer, Friesland. F. Westerling tried to sell the mill in 1884, advertising it as "the Wind-Cornmill at Oldendiever, Diever municipality, with it a newly-built house, along with several plots of meadows, arable fields, and moorland". Evidently the sale didn't succeed, as the mill was offered up for sale by F. Westerling again in 1891, advertising it as a "well-maintained and well-known wind-cornmill in Oldendiever, along with the house, belonging to and in use by F. Westerling". The mill was sold to Jan Hessels Roelofszoon, as evidenced by the mill offered up for sale by his heirs in 1894. The mill was then probably sold to the H.A. Janssen, later to his son J.A. Janssen. He fitted the mill with a cast iron windshaft in 1929 and an oil engine somewhere in the 1920s or 1930s, but the mill is said to be out of use in 1938.

After 1941 the mill became derelict. In 1955, the mill was sold to A. Uiterwijk Winkel, and the mill was restored by millwright H J Huberts of Coevorden. In 1956 the mill restarted commercial operation, and was worked until 1965. However, wind power was rarely used, and the mill fell back into disrepair. In 1979, the mill was purchased by the local municipality, and then restored to full working order.

Since 1981, the mill has stayed in use. In the first years after the restoration, this was on a professional basis, but nowadays this is done by volunteers. Since then the mill has only needed regular maintenance. A new major restoration is expected sometime around 2030.

== Description ==
De Vlijt is what the Dutch describe as an "achtkante stellingmolen", a smock mill with a stage. It has a two-storey base and a two-storey smock. The stage is 3.75 metres (12 ft 4 in) above ground level. The smock and cap are thatched. The four Common sails have aerodynamic lift creating devices on the leading edge using the Fauël system, the so-called "jib system". They have a span of 18.60 metres (61 ft 0 in). The sails are carried on a cast-iron windshaft which was cast in 1858 by the Dutch Steam Boat Company Fyenoord of Rotterdam. It carries the brake wheel, which has 48 teeth. This drives the wallower (27 cogs) at the top of the upright shaft. At the bottom of the upright shaft the great spur wheel with 93 cogs drives the lantern pinion stone nut with 25 staves. This drives the single pair of French Burr millstones. A second pair of millstones is driven by electric motor. The mill is also fitted with a grain crusher, two flour dressers, and a "rye breaker", used to roughly grind rye for the traditional pumpernickel-like bread eaten in the local area.

== Public access ==
De Vlijt is open to the public on Saturdays from 09:00 to 12:00 (September - June) and from 09:00 to 15:00 (June to September), and when the mill is running.
