= John and James (1796 ship) =

History

France
- Launched: 1791
- Captured: 1796

Great Britain
- Name: John and James
- Owner: 1796:Margetson & Co.; 1800:William Forbes & John Carson; 1802:R. Bent
- Acquired: c.1796 by purchase of a prize
- Fate: Lost 1806

General characteristics
- Tons burthen: 427, or 430, or 441 (bm)
- Complement: 1800:30; 1803:45; 1805:60; 1805:55
- Armament: 1800:22 × 9-pounder guns; 1803:22 × 9-pounder guns; 1805:22 × 9&12-pounder guns; 1805:22 × 9&12-pounder guns; 1806:20 × 9 + 2 × 12-pounder guns

John and James was built in France in 1791 under another name and taken in prize in 1796. New owners renamed her and initially sailed her as a West Indiaman. She then made a voyage for the British East India Company (EIC). Next, she became a slave ship, making three voyages between West Africa and the West Indies. Finally, she became a whaler, but was lost in 1806 to a mutinous crew.

== Career ==
John and James first appeared in Lloyd's Register in 1796 with W. Radden, master, Margetson & Co., owners, and trade London–Jamaica.

Her first role appears to have been to carry some officers and passengers to Jamaica, among them Colonel John Moore who was going out to join Admiral Hugh Cloberry Christian and Lieutenant-General Sir Ralph Abercromby's expedition to the West Indies. John and James left on 27 February and arrived at Barbados on 13 April.

EIC voyage (1798–1800): On 17 February 1798 John and James, Captain Stafford Palmer, sailed to Bombay. She returned on 3 February 1800.

On her return from India, John and James became a slave ship sailing from Liverpool. Lloyd's Register for 1801 shows her with S. Irwin, master, changing to Blackey, Forbes & Co., owner, and trade Liverpool−Africa.

First slave voyage (1800−1801): However, it was Captain James Barr who would actually sail her on her first slave voyage. He acquired a letter of marque on 23 July 1800. John and James sailed from Liverpool on 8 August 1800. She gathered her slaves at Bonny and arrived with them at Kingston, Jamaica, on 1 March 1801. There she disembarked 389 slaves. she left Kingston on 14 May and arrived back at Liverpool 23 July. She had left Liverpool with 49 crew and she had five crew deaths during her voyage. She underwent repairs in 1802.

Second slave voyage (1802−1803): The Peace of Amiens had ended the war with France. Captain John Livingston sailed from Liverpool on 20 July 1802. John and James gathered her slaves at Bonny and arrived at Tortola in January 1803. She landed some 289 slaves. At some point A. Lawson replaced Livingston as master. John and James arrived back at Liverpool 22 March 1803.

Third slave voyage (1803−1805): War with France had resumed and Captain James Barr acquired a letter of marque on 30 May 1803. John and James underwent some repairs and left Liverpool on 3 July 1803. She gathered her slaves at Bonny and arrived at Kingston on 3 December. There she landed 395 slaves. She left Kingston on 12 June 1804 and arrived back at Liverpool on 14 August.

Whaler (1805–1806): Captain Andrew Lawson acquired a letter of marque on 21 January 1805, but Captain Henry Folger replaced him before John and James sailed. Folger acquired a letter of marque on 15 February, and sailed from Liverpool, on 28 February, bound for the Pacific Ocean.

On 28 March John and James was "all well" at 36°40′N 15°30′W. She was at Rio de Janeiro on 30 May, having sustained some damage. She also required supplies and calefaction.

== Fate ==
In August 1806 Lloyd's List reported that it was believed that John and James had been lost around Cape Horn. In November 1806 Lloyd's List reported that John and James, Folger, master, to the South Seas and back, had been totally lost at Cape Horn, and that Folger had returned to Nantucket. She had apparently been lost to a "mutinous crew".

The Morning Post of 3 December 1807 carried an advertisement seeking witnesses to the sinking of John and James in January 1806. She was apparently in company with Lucia at the time of her loss.
