= Hart (1803 ship) =

History

United Kingdom
- Name: Hart
- Namesake: Hart (deer)
- Builder: America
- Acquired: 1803 by purchase of a prize
- Fate: Burnt 16 February 1811

General characteristics
- Tons burthen: 128, or 130, or 138 (bm)
- Sail plan: Brig
- Armament: Two guns

Hart was a brig, possibly launched in America in 1809, and taken in prize. From 1809 on, she sailed to the Mediterranean, particularly Malta. A privateer captured her in 1810, but she was recaptured. She burnt in 1811.

== Career ==
Hart first appeared in Lloyd's Register (LR) in 1803, and the Register of Shipping (RS) in 1804. (A Register of Shipping for 1803 is not available online.) Both carried much the same data, though LR described Hart as being American in origin, and launched in 1791. The RS described her as a prize, and had no year of origin.

| Year | Master | Owner | Trade | Source |
|---|---|---|---|---|
| 1803 | J.Park | Captain & Co. | Dublin–Greenock | LR |
| 1804 | J.Park | M'Farlane | Dublin–Greenock | RS |

In its 1809 volume, LR carried Hart twice. (There was no information in Lloyd's List or available British newspapers, that would indicate that there were in fact two different vessels.)

| Year | Master | Owner | Trade | Source |
|---|---|---|---|---|
| 1809 | D.O'May | Allan | Greenock–Cadiz | LR |
| | J.Park | Capt.& Co. | Dublin–Greenock | LR |
| 1809 | R.Clutson | Allan Jr. | Greenock–Limerick | RS; almost rebuilt 1807 |

On 19 January 1810, as Hart, Omay, master, was returning to Britain from Malta (or possibly sailing to Gibraltar and Malta from Liverpool), a privateer captured her at 49°14′N 17°7′W. The British letter of marque John Tobin recaptured Hart, which returned to Liverpool on 8 February. Her master on her return may have been Bewick. Prize money for Hart's recapture was paid to John Tobin's master and crew in October 1811.

Hart returned to her trade. On 22 May 1810, Hart, Omay, master, arrived at Malta.

As Hart, Omay, master, was returning from Malta she was driven ashore on 21 December 1810, in the Clyde.

On 24 December, as Hart, O'May, master, was riding at anchor in Holy Loch in quarantine, having come from Gibraltar, a gale drove her from her anchors and onshore. She was reportedly much damaged.

| Year | Master | Owner | Trade | Source |
|---|---|---|---|---|
| 1810 | D.O'May | Captain & Co. | Greenock–Malta | LR |
| 1811 | D.May | Allen Jr. | Greenock–Cadiz | RS; almost rebuilt 1807 |

== Fate ==
A fire burnt Hart to the water's edge on 16 February 1811, in the New Harbour at Greenock, Renfrewshire. Part of her cargo from Malta was destroyed.

The Register of Shipping volume for 1811 carried the annotation "Burnt" by Hart's name.
