= Minerva (1799 ship) =

British slave ship 1799–1807

History

Great Britain
- Name: Minerva
- Owner: Calvert & Co. (Note: The owners were the partners Anthony Calvert, Thomas King, and William Camden. Anthony Calvert was the managing partner from 1783 until the partnership was dissolved in 1800.)
- Launched: 1791, Americas
- Acquired: 1799 by purchase of a prize
- Fate: Last listed 1813

General characteristics
- Tons burthen: 227, or 228, or 248 (bm)
- Armament: 10 × 6-pounder guns

Minerva was built in the Americas in 1791 and taken in prize from the Spanish. She made six voyages from London as a slave ship in the triangular trade in enslaved people. She is last listed in 1813 but with data stale since her last voyage transporting enslaved people in 1807.

== Career ==
Minerva first appeared in Lloyd's Register (LR) in 1799 with Cowley, master, Calvert & Co., owners, and trade London–Africa. She was almost rebuilt in 1799 as well.

1st voyage transporting enslaved people (1799–1801): Captain Richard Coley sailed from London on 28 July 1799. In 1799, 156 vessels sailed from English ports, bound for Africa to acquire and transport enslaved people; 17 of these vessels sailed from London.

Minerva acquired captives at Cape Coast Castle and arrived at Demerara on 12 August 1800. There she landed 359 captives. She arrived back at London on 18 January 1801. On 6 January Lloyd's List reported that Minerva, Cooley, master, had parted from her anchors at pithead and put into Portsmouth. She was on her way from Berbice to London.

2nd voyage transporting enslaved people (1801–1802): Captain Coley sailed from London on 4 August 1801. In 1801, 147 vessels sailed from English ports, bound for Africa to acquire and transport enslaved people; 23 of these vessels sailed from London.

Minerva started acquiring captives on 18 November. She acquired captives at Cape Coast Castle and arrived with them at Havana on 1 May 1802. She landed 248 captives. She returned to London on 22 August.

3rd voyage transporting enslaved people (1802–1804): Captain Coley sailed from London on 23 November 1802. In 1802, 155 vessels sailed from English ports, bound for Africa to acquire and transport enslaved people; 30 of these vessels sailed from London.

Coley started acquiring captives on 29 January 1803, stopping at Elmina, Cape Coast Castle, and Accra. On 13 May 1803 Lloyd's List (LL) reported that Minerva, Coley, master, had arrived at Africa. The same report mentioned that Minerva, Silcock, master, had also arrived there. Minerva, arrived at Demerara on 3 December 1803 and landed 220 captives. She left Demerara on 8 February 1804 with M'Iver, master, and arrived at London on 30 April.

Lloyd's Register for 1804 showed Minerva with H.Coley, master, changing to J.M'Iver, T. King, owner, and trade London–Africa. It also showed her burthen as 248 tons.

4th voyage transporting enslaved people (1804–1805): Captain George Adams sailed from London on 2 September 1804. In 1804, 147 vessels sailed from English ports, bound for Africa to acquire and transport enslaved people; 18 of these vessels sailed from London.

Minerva started acquiring captives on the Gold Coast on 16 November. She arrived at Cumingsberg (British Guiana), on 7 March 1805. There she landed 256 captives. She left on 1 April and arrived back at London on 10 June.

5th voyage transporting enslaved people (1805–1806): Captain James Boswell left London on 5 July 1805. Minerva acquired her captives at Accra and landed 116 captives at Demerara on 6 May 1806. She arrived back at London on 30 September.

6th voyage transporting enslaved people (1807): Captain Boswell sailed from London on 9 February 1807. He acquired Minerva's captives at Cape Coast Castle and Accra, and arrived at Kingston, Jamaica, on 1 August. There she landed 253 captives.

The Slave Trade Act 1807 banned the slave trade within the British Empire. Because Minerva had left before the deadline of 1 May 1807, her voyage was still legal. (The last legal voyage was that of Kitty's Amelia, which left on 27 July, but with a clearance dated before the deadline.)

== Fate ==
There is no record in Lloyd's List's ship arrival and departure data of Minerva's return to England. She was lasted in LR and RS until 1813, but with stale data.
