= French ship Embuscade =

Several ships of the French Navy have borne the name Embuscade:

- Embuscade (1670), renamed Dangereux in 1677, then restored to Embuscade later in 1677. Re-classed as fireship 1677 and sold in 1688.
- Embuscade (1704), captured in May 1707 by the Royal Navy.
- Embuscade (1745), captured in 1746 and renamed HMS Ambuscade. She was sold at Deptford in 1762.
- Embuscade (1789), a frigate captured in 1798, later renamed HMS Seine when the previous Ambuscade was recaptured in 1803. She was broken up in 1813.
- Embuscade (1798), HMS Ambuscade captured by the French corvette Bayonnaise in 1798 and renamed Embuscade. She was recaptured by the British in 1803 and broken up in 1810.
- Embuscade (1865), a floating battery stricken in 1885.
