= La Diligence (restaurant) =

Coordinates: 50°56′15.33″N 5°47′27.72″E

- Interactive map of La Diligence

Restaurant information
- Head chef: Bèr Smeets
- Rating: Michelin Guide
- Location: Maastrichterlaan 29, Beek, 6191 AA, Netherlands

Restaurant La Diligence is a defunct restaurant in Beek, in the Netherlands. It was a fine dining restaurant that was awarded one Michelin star in 1979 and retained that rating until 1985.

Owner and head chef was Bèr Smeets.

In 1974, Smeets took over the closed Parkhotel. After a renovation, the hotel and restaurant were reopened in February 1974.

The restaurant was located in a villa on the Maastrichterlaan, which was demolished in 1992.

== See also ==
- List of Michelin starred restaurants in the Netherlands
