= USRC Argus =

Revenue Cutter

History

United States
- Name: Argus
- Namesake: A giant with 100 eyes, from Greek mythology
- Operator: Revenue Cutter Service
- Launched: 1791
- Commissioned: 1791
- Decommissioned: 1804
- Fate: Sold, 1804

General characteristics
- Class & type: Sloop
- Displacement: 48 8/95 Tons
- Length: 47 ft 9 in
- Beam: 16 ft 3 in
- Draft: 6 ft 2 in
- Propulsion: Sail
- Crew: 4 officers, 4 enlisted, 2 boys
- Armament: Probably ten muskets with bayonets; twenty pistols; two chisels; one broad axe.

USRC Argus was one of the first ten cutters operated by the United States' Revenue Cutter Service (later to become the US Coast Guard). Of the ten cutters, she was the longest to serve in this role.

== Operational service ==
Argus was a sloop, built in New London, for service in Connecticut and Rhode Island waters. She began her first patrol on 16 October 1791, soon after being fitted-out, under the command of Jonathan Maltbie, a veteran of the Continental Navy. He died on 11 February 1798 and was replaced by Elisha Hinman on 13 March of that year. Hinman was also a veteran of the Continental Navy and the former commanding officer of the famous frigate Alfred. Two journals describing her actions have turned up; one from the second mate Nathaniel Nichols, who kept a journal from 1791-1795; and Hinman's journal, dated from 1799 through 1803. These journals do provide a glimpse into what life was like on board a Revenue cutter during these early years of the new republic.

Argus stayed in service for a total of thirteen years, by far the longest of any of the original ten cutters. She was sold to two New London based merchants and was sold five months later in a foreign port.

=== Commanding officers ===
Captain Jonathan Maltbie, master; 1791-1798.
Captain Elisha Hinman, master; 1798-1803.
Captain George House, master; 1803-1804.

=== Crew (as of October, 1791) ===
George House, first mate; took over as master in 1803; Ebenezer Perkins was promoted to first mate.
Jere Greenman, second mate; he left the Argus in 1799 and was replaced by Ebenezer Perkins.
Vacant, third mate [no third mate at this time]; Ebenezer Perkins was appointed as third mate in December, 1792; Perkins was promoted to second mate in 1799 and Nathaniel Saltonstall was appointed as third mate.
David Poole, mariner.
Gabriel Calvon, mariner.
Wm. McNeal, mariner.
Henry Owen, mariner.
Sam Robertson, boy.
Chas Williams, boy.
