= USRC Active (1791) =

Revenue cutter ship

History

United States
- Name: Active
- Operator: Revenue Cutter Service
- Launched: 9 April 1791
- Commissioned: 1791
- Decommissioned: 9 April 1791
- Fate: Sold, 1800

General characteristics
- Displacement: 58 8/95th tons
- Length: 58 ft 8 in
- Beam: 17 ft 3 in
- Draft: 6 ft 6 in
- Propulsion: Sail
- Complement: 3 officers
- Crew: 4 crewmen, 2 boys
- Armament: Ten muskets with bayonets; twenty pistols; two chisels; one broad axe.

One of the first ten revenue cutters, Active may have been the second of the ten cutters to enter service. The Columbian Centinel on 30 April 1791 noted:

A Revenue Cutter, was launched at Baltimore the 9th inst. at Captain Stodder's Ship Yard, and is considered by good judges, a beautiful vessel. She is to be commanded, we hear, by Capt. Gross, formerly First-Lieutenant of the Continental Frigate CONFEDERACY.

== Operational history ==
Active almost never made it into the water. Apparently no shipbuilder in the Baltimore area was willing to build a cutter for the price offered by the government. Eventually, after an exasperated Secretary of the Treasury Alexander Hamilton offered to increase the payment by no more than 10 percent and then threatened to have the Maryland cutter built in Virginia, David Stodder, of Baltimore, agreed to build the revenue cutter for the government's asking price. She was laid down in January 1791 and her keel entered the water on 9 April of that same year. When she was sold out of government service in 1798, she was described as having a "square stern, a square tuck, no galleries and no figurehead." She was a two-masted topsail schooner with a single deck. It is also known how she was initially outfitted and equipped thanks to the survival of a letter from her first master, Simon Gross, to Alexander Hamilton.

=== Personnel problems ===
Active seemed to have been plagued with problems from the start. For the first few months of her existence she remained tied up in port. Gross, a man of known intemperance, had trouble hiring a crew at the wages the government offered. The pay in the merchant service proved to be much more lucrative. Gross also did not get along with his first mate. These problems manifested themselves, despite the name of the cutter, in a decided lack of activity. Baltimore's Collector of Customs complained that merchant vessel manifests, supplied to the Active by incoming ships, did not reach his desk for weeks, if at all. Relative incompetence amongst the officers and difficulty obtaining a full crew continually troubled the revenue cutter throughout its service life. Indeed, the collector wrote Hamilton in disgust that the cutter was "of no more advantage to the United States and perhaps much less, than if she had been built and manned on the lake Erie."

Gross and Porter both saw fit to leave the cutter under the command of the second mate on numerous occasions, thereby adding to the frustration of the collector and the Secretary of the Treasury as well. Gross submitted his resignation in the summer of 1792 and Porter, with the recommendation of President George Washington, assumed command of the lackluster Active. Even the President seemed satisfied that Gross was leaving government service. He noted in a letter that "... the service would sustain no loss by the resignation of the Master of the Maryland Revenue Cutter."

Little seemed to change under the command of Porter although he did complain that his third mate, Forbes, had difficulty staying away from the bottle, as apparently did some of the other crewmen. Many of the crew were also unhappy with the daily ration allowance and poor pay and as such Porter, as did Gross, had trouble finding crewmen. He wrote to Hamilton asking for an increase, and Hamilton promptly raised the daily ration allowance from nine cents to 12. It is not certain if this solved Porter's problems but Porter once again asked for a greater increase in both the pay and ration allowances. This, however, was not the way to endear him to the parsimonious Secretary of the Treasury. But one wonders if Porter really cared at all. Despite his apparent concern for the welfare of his men and attention to duty, Hamilton was perplexed at the obvious inaction of the cutter, its commanding officer, and even his collector of customs.

According to Kern, for the next few years Porter rarely sailed on Active, rather, he let the first mate handle command of the cutter—if she sailed on patrol at all. He did sail to the West Indies with his son, twice in 1796, but not on board his cutter. He sailed on board a merchant vessel in which he had a monetary stake. Whether he had permission to leave his duty post and what occurred on board the cutter while he was way is unknown. Unfortunately her journals have not survived the ravages of the British Army, which burned Washington, D.C. in 1814, and the later fire at the United States Treasury Department in 1833, so there is little documentation regarding her accomplishments or conversely, explaining her inaction. But Hamilton's letters have survived and he was not overly pleased with his Baltimore-based cutter. Indeed, when ordered to sell the Active in 1798, Porter could not locate her! He eventually found her grounded in the mud of the riverbank outside Baltimore Harbor. She was sold at auction for $750.00 and her new owners sailed her to the West Indies and promptly sold her once again. Porter stayed on the federal payroll for another year after his cutter had been sold.

The cast of characters who paraded on, around, and nowhere near her decks continued to lead rather interesting lives. Porter went back into the merchant trade after failing to secure a commission in the Navy and ran into trouble in the courts under suspicion of barratry and fraud. He was apparently not convicted and he eventually received a naval commission as the sailing master of gunboat based at New Orleans in 1807—under the overall command of his son! It seems that David Junior joined the Navy as a midshipman at the age of nineteen and went on to have a distinguished career. Indeed, he became one of the Navy's most celebrated heroes, as did his two sons and his adopted son, David Glasgow Farragut. Not so the first master of the Active, Simon Gross. Gross had secured a commission as a first lieutenant in the Navy after leaving the Active, only to earn the wrath of another famous naval personage, Captain Thomas Truxton, who admonished him that "every drunkard is a Nuisance and no drunkard ought to be employ'd and if employ'd Shall ever remain an officer with me." He later picked a fight with, of all people, David Porter, Junior, when they were both lieutenants. Gross made some rather "insulting" remarks about Porter's father, who, it will be remembered, was Gross's first mate on the Active! After a fistfight, Gross was dismissed from the service and he then enlisted as a seaman in the Navy. The last anyone heard of him he was an oarsman on an officer's barge.

== Commanding officers ==
Captain Simon Gross, Master; 1791–1792

Captain David Porter, Master; 1792–1798

Original Crew:

David Porter, First Mate William Thomas, Second Mate James Forbes, Third Mate; replaced by William Dunton when Forbes moved to second mate in 1792.

== Notes ==
Citations

References cited

- Active, 1791, US Coast Guard website.
- Canney, Donald, 1995: U.S. Coast Guard and Revenue Cutters, 1790-1935. Annapolis, MD: Naval Institute Press.
- Evans, Stephen H., 1949: The United States Coast Guard, 1790-1915: A Definitive History (With a Postscript: 1915-1950). Annapolis: The United States Naval Institute, 1949.
- Kern, Florence, 1977: A Beautiful Vessel: Simon Gross's U.S. Revenue Cutter Active, 1791-1798, Washington, DC: Alised Enterprises.
- U.S. Coast Guard, 1934: Record of Movements: Vessels of the United States Coast Guard: 1790 - December 31, 1933, Washington, DC: U.S. Government Printing Office (reprinted 1989).
