= USRC Diligence =

History

United States
- Name: Diligence
- Namesake: None
- Operator: Revenue Cutter Service
- Launched: June/July 1792?
- Commissioned: 1792?
- Decommissioned: 1798
- Fate: Sold 5 November 1798

General characteristics
- Class & type: Schooner
- Displacement: 40 Tons
- Propulsion: Sail
- Crew: 4 officers, 4 enlisted, 2 boys
- Armament: Probably ten muskets with bayonets; twenty pistols; two chisels; one broad axe.

USRC Diligence was one of the first ten cutters operated by the United States' Revenue Cutter Service (later to become the US Coast Guard).

== Operational service ==
Diligence was built at Washington, North Carolina and was based out of New Bern after entering service in the summer of 1792. She transferred to Wilmington in October that same year. Her first commanding officer was William Cooke. In 1793, Benjamin Gardner was appointed as the first mate and James Sandy was appointed as the cutter's second mate. Little is known about her history during this time other than the fact that she was involved in the San Jose affair of 1793. The San Jose was a Spanish vessel with some gold on board as cargo; she was captured illegally by the French privateer Amiable Margaretta. Cooke and his crew seized the San Jose from the Amiable Margaretta.

In 1796 Cooke disappeared and was replaced by John Brown, who served as her commanding officer until the cutter was sold in 1798 for $310.

== Commanding officers ==
William Cooke, Master; 1792-1796.

John Brown, Master; 1796-1798.
