= USRC General Green =

History

United States
- Name: General Green
- Operator: Revenue Cutter Service
- Launched: 7 July 1791
- Completed: 5 August 1791
- Commissioned: 1791
- Decommissioned: 1797
- Fate: Sold December 1797

General characteristics
- Class & type: Schooner
- Propulsion: Sail
- Complement: 4 officers, 4 enlisted, 2 boys
- Armament: Ten muskets with bayonets; twenty pistols; two chisels; one broad axe.

USRC General Green was one of the first ten cutters operated by the U.S. Revenue Cutter Service. She was named for the Revolutionary War hero Major General Nathanael Greene. Her name was misspelled, probably by the man who oversaw her construction, the Collector of Customs in Philadelphia, Sharp Delany. Apparently the cutter was to have been originally named for the Secretary of the Treasury, Alexander Hamilton, but Delany changed the name for reasons unknown.

== Operational history ==
There is little or no information on her original design and unfortunately her monthly journals have not survived but some correspondence regarding her has, particularly the exchange of letters between her master, James Montgomery, and Delany. Indeed, there is a letter dated 23 July 1791 from the collector at Boston, Benjamin Lincoln, to Hamilton that states General Green left Adam Foulk's wharf in Philadelphia, completely outfitted, on 7 July of that year, making her one of the first of the cutters to actually enter into service. Isaac Roach was appointed as the first mate and Benjamin Rue was appointed as the second mate on 21 March 1791.

Montgomery was the commanding officer of the Collector's barge in Philadelphia and so had some experience in revenue work prior to his commission as the master of the new cutter. He had also seen service during the Revolution as an officer in the Pennsylvania State Navy and later saw action as the commanding officer of a privateer.

General Green had an active career patrolling the waters off Philadelphia and carrying out the federal laws of the land as instituted during President George Washington's administration. When Great Britain and France went to war in 1793, Washington declared the neutrality of the United States and the cutters acted as the government's law enforcement arm at sea. Her most exciting mission was undoubtedly when she was ordered to seize the French privateer Les Jumeaux, which was outfitting in Philadelphia, in direct violation of the neutrality laws. The privateer got underway in December 1794 and General Green overtook her 40 miles off Wilmington, Delaware. The Deputy Collector, Robinett, sailed on board the cutter and was in overall command of this seizure.

General Green was sold in 1798 to William Moodie of Philadelphia.

== Commanding officers ==
James Montgomery, Master; 21 March 1791-1797

== Notes ==
=== References cited ===
- General Green, U.S. Coast Guard Historian's Office website.
- Canney, Donald L. (1995). U.S. Coast Guard and Revenue Cutters, 1790–1935. Naval Institute Press, Annapolis, Maryland. ISBN 978-1-55750-101-1.
- Evans, Stephen H. (1949). The United States Coast Guard 1790–1915: A Definitive History. Naval Institute Press, Annapolis, Maryland. No ISBN
- Kern, Florence, 1977: "A Boat in Our Bay": James Montgomery's U.S. Revenue Cutter General Green, 1791-1797, Washington, DC: Alised Enterprises.
- Noble, Dennis L. (1990). Historical Register U.S. Revenue Cutter Service Officers, 1790–1914. Coast Guard Historian's Office, U.S. Coast Guard Headquarters, Washington, DC.
