= West Indies Squadron =

West Indies Squadron can refer to one of the following:

- West Indies Squadron (United States), a United States Navy formation
- North America and West Indies Station, a Royal Navy formation

See also

- West India Squadron (disambiguation)
