= West India Squadron =

West India Squadron may refer to:

- The North America and West Indies Station of the Royal Navy during the Napoleonic Wars
- The West India Squadron, a component of the United States Navy in the Union blockade during the American Civil War

== See also ==
- West Indies Squadron (disambiguation)
