= List of slave ships =

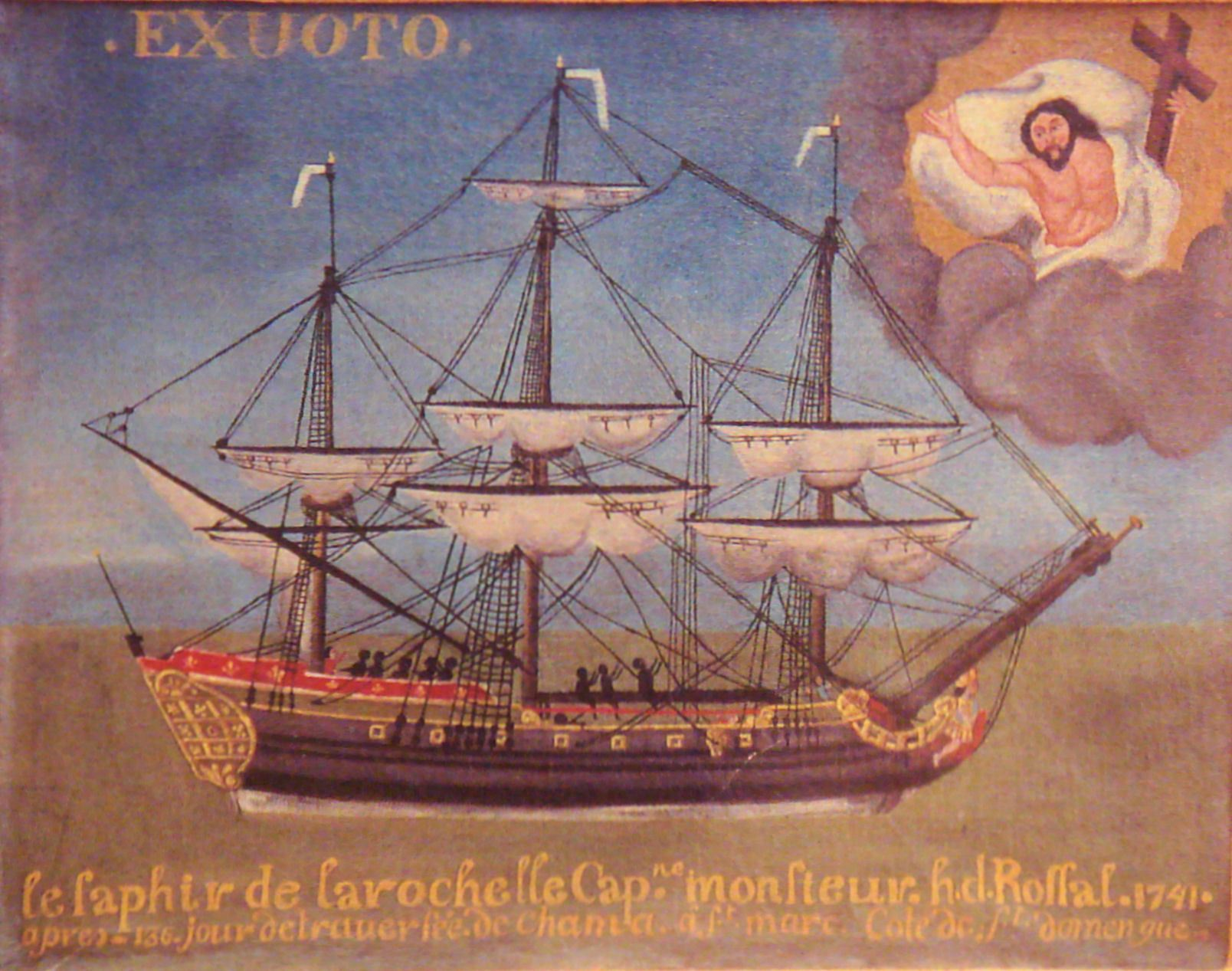
The slave ship Le Saphir, 1741

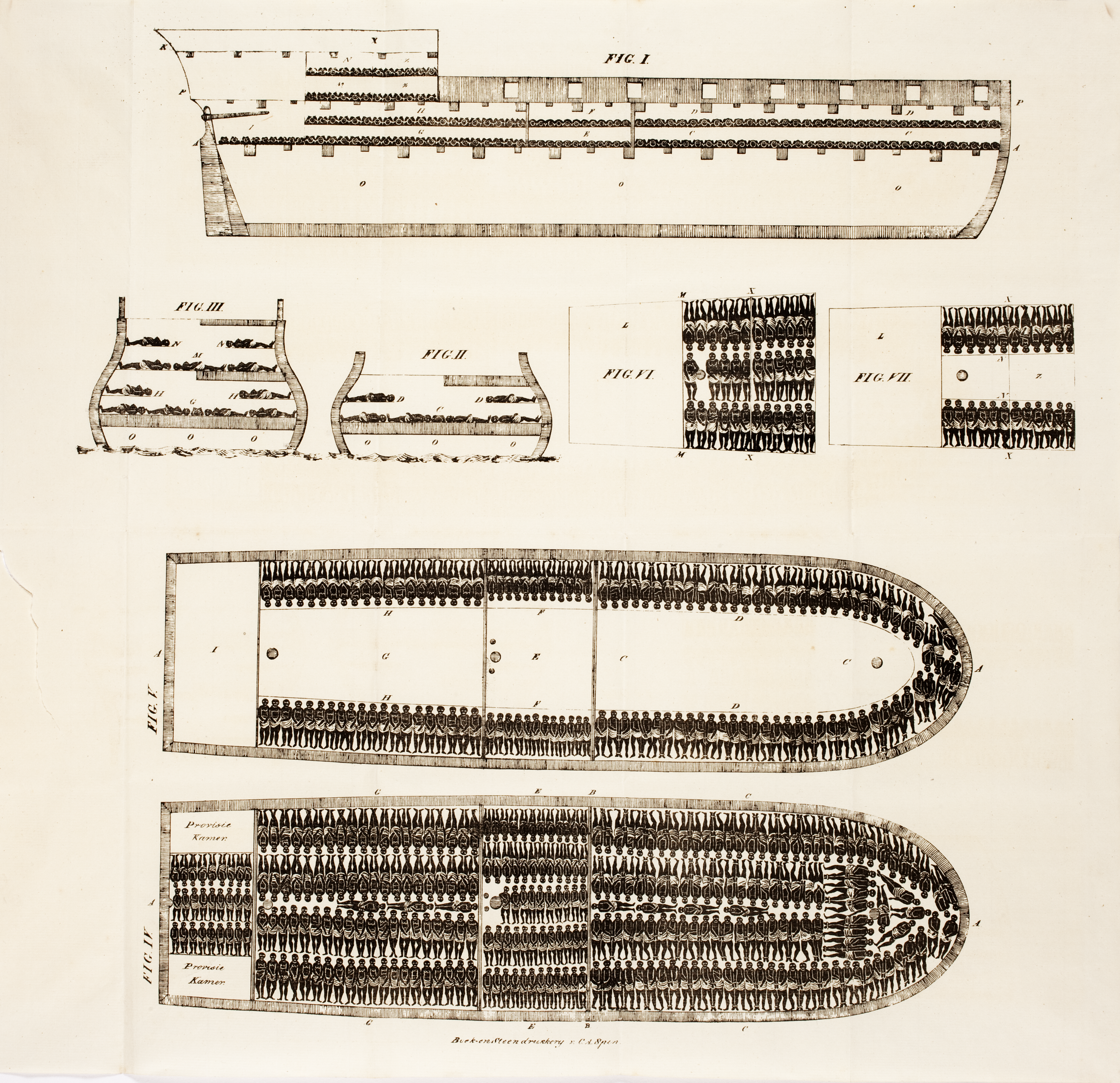
Diagram of the Brooks (1781), a four-deck large slave ship. Thomas Clarkson: The cries of Africa to the inhabitants of Europe

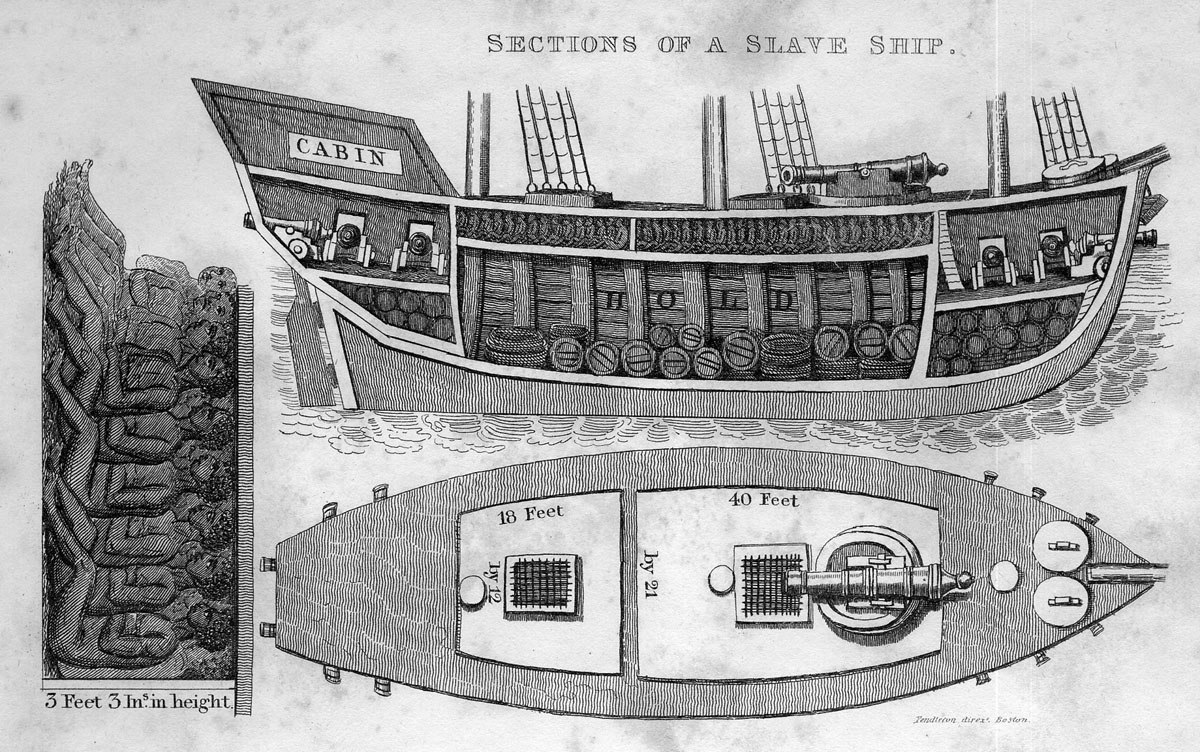
The slave-ship Veloz, illustrated in 1830. It held over 550 slaves.

This is a list of slave ships. These were ships used to carry enslaved people, mainly in the Atlantic slave trade between the 16th and the 19th centuries.

- Abby was of 98 tons (bm). Captain Murdock Murchy sailed from Liverpool on 19 September 1795. He sailed from Africa on 15 May 1796. The French captured Abby in 1796, after she had embarked her captives. She arrived at Martinique in July with 199 captives.
- Abby was built in the Thirteen Colonies in 1774. She was of 154 tons. She appeared in Lloyd's Register (LR) in 1797, with J.Wilson, master, changing to C.Webb, owner J.Kenyon, changing to J.Siving, and trade Liverpool–New York, changing to Liverpool–Africa. Captain Webb sailed from Liverpool on 24 May 1797. Lloyd's List reported in December 1797, that the French had captured her and taken her into Gorée.
- Aggie (1777 ship) was launched in Liverpool in 1777. She traded locally until 1781 when her owners renamed her Spy and placed her in the slave trade. The French Navy captured her in 1782 in the West Indies as she was arriving to deliver her cargo of enslaved people.
- Africa was a slave ship that held Olaudah Equiano in 1756. Abdul al-Rahman Ibrahima aka Abduhl Rahhahman aka Abdul Rahman Ibrahim Ibn Sori (1762-1829) was a Fulani prince who was captured and shipped on the Africa to America where he was sold into slavery to Thomas Foster.
- Ajax Brig mentioned in Bernard Raux slave trade papers, 1828-1836, Harvard University Library.
- Albinia was built on the River Thames in 1744. Between 1752 and 1753 she made one voyage from the Gold Coast to Kingston, Jamaica, where she arrived with 178 captives.
- Antelope (1797 ship) was built at Batavia in 1792 and captured in 1797. She sailed from London on 20 May 1798. She embarked captives at Anomabu, and later was reported off Grenada on her way to Jamaica. Her subsequent fate is currently unknown.
- Antelope (1802 slave ship) was a Spanish slave ship captured near Florida in 1820 with 283 captives aboard, leading to The Antelope case.
- Ariel Brig mentioned in Bernard Raux slave trade papers, 1828-1836, Harvard University Library.
- Arrogante was a Portuguese schooner captured in 1837. Reportedly, one of the slaves on board was murdered, cut into pieces, cooked, then served with rice to the other slaves.
- Aurore (slave ship), along with Duc du Maine (slave ship), the first French slave ships that brought the first slaves to Louisiana.

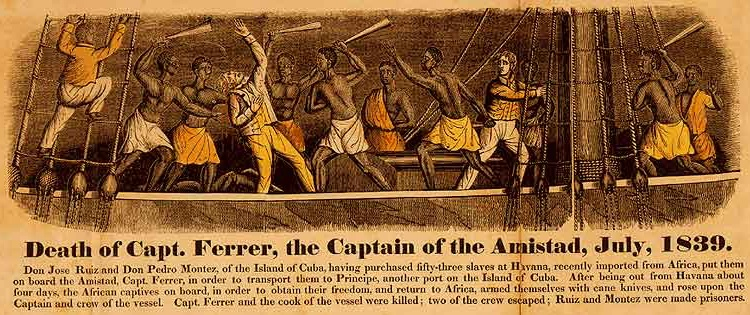
Slave revolt on La Amistad in 1839

- La Amistad, general-purpose cargo ship that also carried slaves on occasion. A successful slave revolt on the ship gave rise to a case that reached the Supreme Court in United States v. The Amistad.
- Backhouse (1785 ship) was launched at Chester. She initially sailed as a West Indiaman. In 1792–1793 she made one enslaving voyage. Once in 1796 and again in 1797 she repelled attacks by French privateers in single-ship actions. Backhouse made four more enslaving voyages and then returned to the West Indies trade. After about 1809 she became a London coaster and was last listed in 1813.
- Backhouse (1798 ship) was launched at Dartmouth. In all, she made four enslaving voyages. Between the second and the third, and after the fourth, she was a West Indiaman. A French privateer captured her early in 1810 as she was returning to Britain from Brazil.

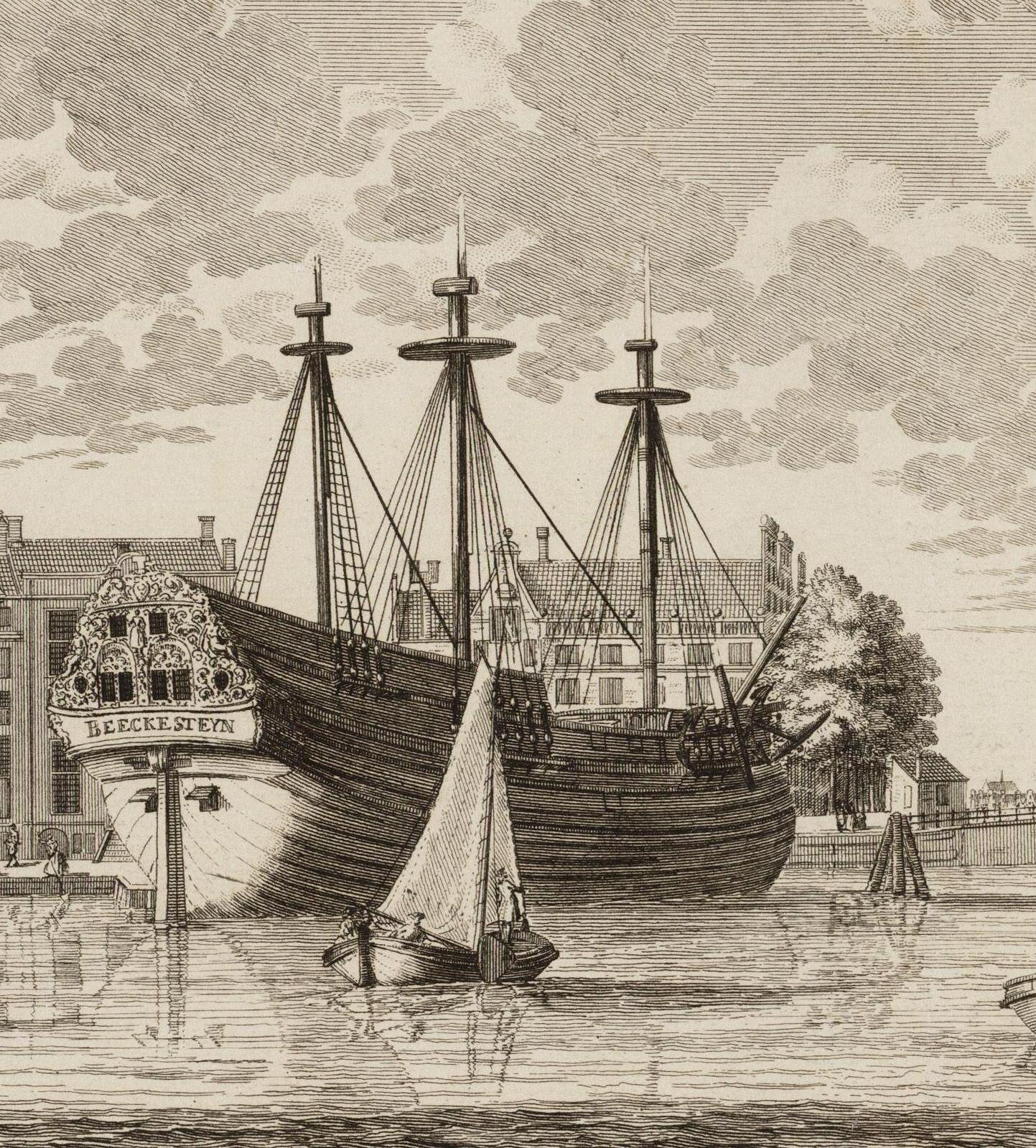
c. 1735 engraving of the Dutch West India Company slave ship Beeckestijn docked in Amsterdam

- Beeckestijn, Dutch West India Company slaver 1722-1736.
- Bird, of 244 or 254 tons burthen, was a French prize. Captain Thomas Flynn sailed from Liverpool on 21 November 1798. Bird acquired captives at Bonny and arrived at Martinique on 27 June 1799 with 344 captives. She sailed for Liverpool on 21 July and arrived back there on 18 September. She had left Liverpool with 47 crew members and she had suffered 22 crew deaths on her voyage. On her return, Bird's master changed to J.Hughes. Bird, Hughes, master, was wrecked in March off Corsica. She was on a voyage from Liverpool to Livorno.
- Bloom (1781 ship) was launched in the Thirteen Colonies in 1781. She was taken in prize in 1782. She became a Liverpool-based slave ship and from 1783 on made four complete voyages in the triangular trade in enslaved people. She was broken up in 1789.
- Bloom (1789 ship) was launched in 1789 at Liverpool as a Guineaman. She made three complete enslaving voyages in the triangular trade in enslaved people. She then made a voyage as a West Indiaman, before trading between Cork and Liverpool. She was last listed in 1799.
- Britannia (1788 ship), was a vessel launched in 1788 at New Brunswick. She made one complete enslaving voyage taking captives from West Africa to Jamaica. The French captured her on the outward leg of her second voyage.
- Brooks, sailing in the 1780s.
- Bud (1783 ship) was launched at Liverpool in 1783. Between 1783 and 1800, she made 12 complete voyages as a slave ship in the triangular trade in enslaved people. In 1796 she repelled an attack by a faster, better armed, and more heavily crewed French privateer in a single ship action. Then in 1798, a French privateer captured her in another single ship action after Bud's short but sanguinary resistance. The Royal Navy quickly captured her, and her captor. On her 13th enslaving voyage she was condemned at Kingston, Jamaica after she had arrived with her captives.
- Caroline was a Portuguese brigantine, captured by HMS Electra on 25 March 1839 near Rio de Janeiro. She was purchased there on 27 May 1840 by the British navy as HMS Fawn.
- Chato Murgo, from Liverpool to Africa and the West Indies, was lost on the coast of Africa in 1800.
- City of Norfolk, fitted out in New York City by Albert Horn.
- Clotilda, burned and sunk at Mobile, in 1859 or 1860.
- Cora, captured by USS Constellation in 1860.
- Creole, involved in the United States coastwise slave trade and the scene of a slave rebellion in 1841, leading to the Creole case.
- Desire, first American slave ship.
- Don was a schooner of 71 tons that sailed from Britain in 1798 and delivered 111 captives to Martinique in 1799.
- Duncan, a Rhode Island slave ship on the African coast in August 1775.
- Duc du Maine, along with Aurore, brought the first slaves to Louisiana.
- Elisabeth, sailing from Jamaica for West Africa.
- Elizabeth (1786 ship) was launched at Bermuda in 1786 (or 1790). She first appeared in Lloyd's Register in 1802. She then made four enslaving voyages, during the second of which a French privateer captured her; the British Royal Navy quickly recaptured her. After the end of the British slave trade in 1807, she spent a little over a year as a hired armed tender under contract to the Royal Navy. She returned to mercantile service trading with Madeira or Africa, until in late in 1809 another French privateer captured her.
- Elizabeth (1798 Lancaster ship) was launched at Lancaster in 1798. She made five complete enslaving voyages. Spanish privateers captured her in 1805 while she was on her sixth enslaving voyage after she had embarked captives.
- Elizabeth (1806 ship) was launched at Liverpool. A French privateer captured her in 1807 while she was on her first enslaving voyage.
- Emanuela, ship seized in 1860 with over 800 slaves aboard.
- Erie, the ship owned and captained by Nathaniel Gordon, the only American executed for slave trading
- Esmeralda, captured 1 November 1864 off Loango, West Coast of Africa, by HMS Rattler (1864) and Taken to St. Helena to prize court by C.G. Nelson midshipman in command.
- Fletcher, 1771-1783 ship owned by John Fletcher of London and mastered by Peleg Clarke of Newport, Rhode Island carried tea to the colonies and slaves to Jamaica.
- Fredensborg, Danish slave ship, sank in 1768 off Tromøya in Norway, after a journey in the triangular trade. Leif Svalesen wrote a book about the journey.
- Friendship was launched in France or Spain, possibly in 1780. The British captured her in 1797 and she became a West Indiaman, and from 1798 a slave ship. Friendship made two complete voyages carrying captives from West Africa to the West Indies. On her third voyage crew members mutinied, taking her before she had embarked any captives. They sailed for a French port in the Caribbean but the Royal Navy retook her in 1801 and brought her into Barbados. There the Government Agent sold her. The incident resulted in a legal dispute between the owners and the insurers that in 1813 was decided in favour of the owners. New owners in 1803 continued to sail Friendship as West Indiaman. She was last listed in 1810.
- Gallito, Spanish slave ship carrying 136 Africans when captured by HMS Nimble 16 November 1829.
- Gertrudis la Preciosa, of 295 tons (bm), was the former British vessel Carleton (or Charleton), but was sailing under the Spanish flag. She acquired captives at Old Calabar. She was on her way to Havana when HMS Creole captured her on 9 June 1814 fewer than 20 miles from Fernando Po; HMS Astraea was in sight. Gertrudis was brought into Freetown, Sierra Leone, where she and her cargo of 477 or 482 captives were condemned. An appeal of the condemnation was filed. Amongst other things, this revealed that she had left Old Calabar on 1 June with 529 captives on board. The appeal was partially successful when the claimants demonstrated that they had British assurances that British allies could engage in enslaving without British interference.
- Guerrero, Spanish slave ship wrecked in the Florida Keys in 1827 carrying 561 Africans.
- Hare, a slave ship that plied the Atlantic slave trade.
- Hannibal, an English slaver of the Atlantic slave trade.
- The Hawk, The Hawk sailed for Calabar, with instructions to buy 340 slaves.
- Hebe, Portuguese slave ship carrying 401 Angolans when captured by HMS Nimble 13 July 1832.
- Henrietta Marie, sank in 1700 near Marquesas Keys, Florida, excavated in 1980s.
- Hermosa, a schooner whose 1840 grounding in the Bahamas led to a controversy between the US and Britain over the 38 slaves who had been on board the ship.
- Hope, American brig that brought slaves to Rhode Island
- Isabella, British slave ship that brought the first 150 African slaves to the American port of Philadelphia in 1684.
- Jamaica Planter, Mr. George Burton, merchant of London, was slave trading on Gold Coast and West Indies in 1775.
- James, was launched in Spain in 1802, almost certainly under another name. She was captured in 1804 and registered in Liverpool in 1806. Captain Robert Tyrer carried ~250 slaves during two voyages. She was condemned after having delivered the captives from her second enslaving voyage.
- Joaquina, Spanish slave ship carrying 348 Africans when captured by HMS Nimble 10 November 1833.
- Josefa, Spanish schooner carrying 206 slaves when captured by HMS Monkey 7 April 1829.

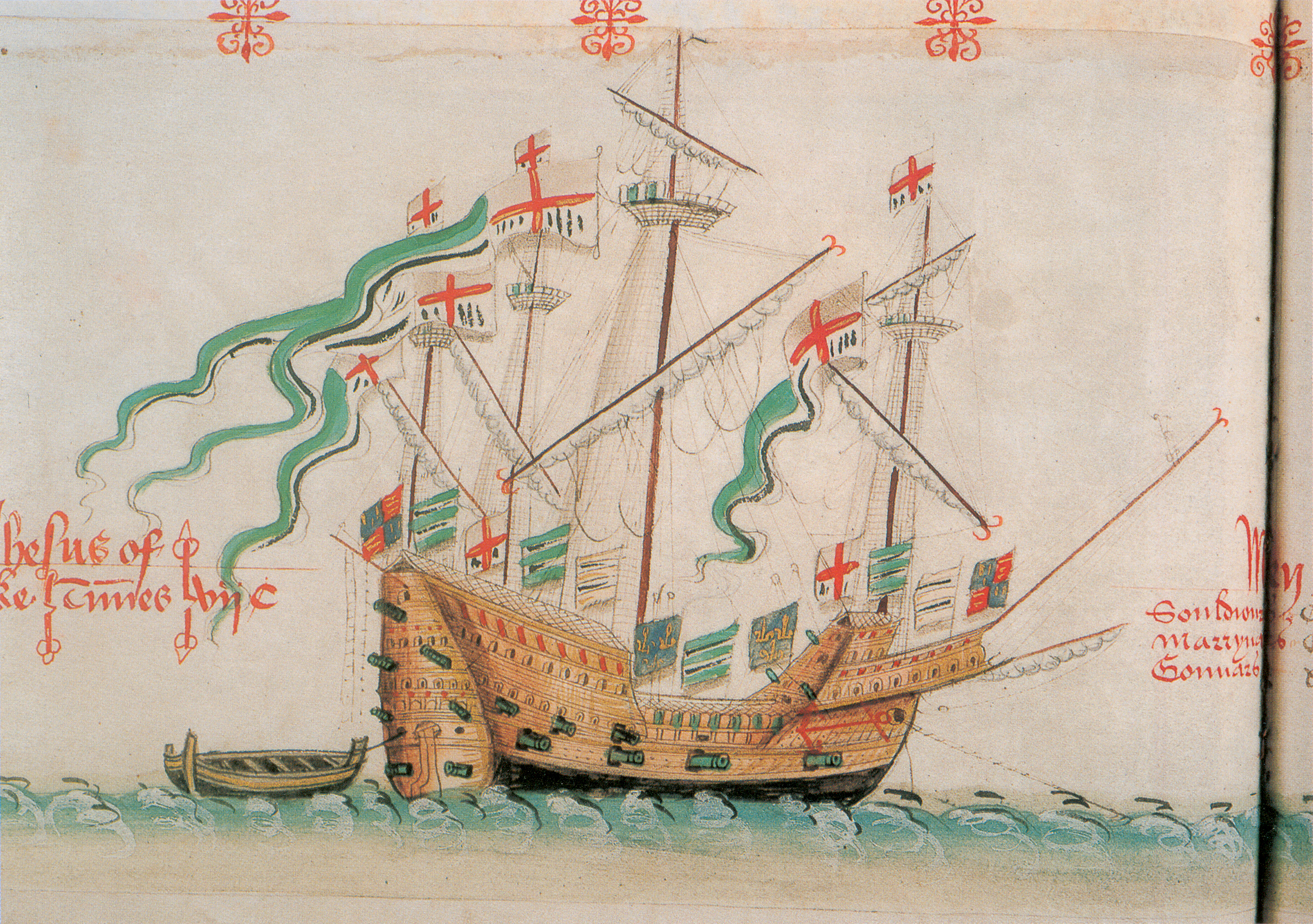
Queen Elizabeth I's Jesus of Lübeck, chartered by John Hawkins

- Jesus of Lübeck, a 700-ton ship used on the second voyage of John Hawkins to transport 400 captured Africans in 1564. Queen Elizabeth I was his partner and rented him the vessel.
- King David, sailing from St Christophers, on St Kitts in the Caribbean 1749.
- King Grey (1786 ship) (or King Gray), first appeared in online British records in 1786. She made five enslaving voyages between 1786 and 1793. On her last enslaving voyage the French captured her but the Royal Navy quickly recaptured her. She was sold at Kingston, Jamaica. She became a privateer but in December 1795 fire from French Republican shore artillery sank her at Tiburon where she was supporting French Royalist forces as an armed ship.
- La Concord, a slave ship captured by the pirate Blackbeard (Edward Teach), used as his flagship and renamed Queen Anne's Revenge. Run aground in June 1718.
- La Negrita, Spanish slave ship carrying 189 Africans when captured by HMS Nimble May 1833.
- Lapwing (1794 ship) was launched in 1794 at Bristol. A Spanish privateer captured her in 1801 after she had embarked her captives and was in the Middle Passage, taking them to the West Indies.
- Leusden, Dutch West Indies Company slave ship wrecked in 1738 at the mouth of the Maroni river in Surinam where the crew killed nearly 700 African slaves.
- Liver, a British ship, launched in 1786 as a smack, and expanded in 1790 to become a slave ship. She was captured in 1797 after making five voyages.
- Louisiana Brig mentioned in Bernard Raux slave trade papers, 1828-1836, Harvard University Library. WorldCat link
- Lord Ligonier. See Roots: The Saga of an American Family by Alex Haley.
- Lune, a British ship, launched in 1794 at New Brunswick, possibly under another name. She first appeared in British records in 1798. She made one complete voyage as a slave ship in the triangular trade in slaves. A French privateer captured her in 1800 early in her second voyage before she reached Africa.
- Don Francisco, a slave ship captured in 1837. Sold as a colonial trader and renamed James Matthews. Excavated by Western Australian Museum in 1974.
- Madre de Deus, 1567. John Hawkins captured this ship and transported 400 Africans.
- Malvina (1796 ship) was launched in 1796 in the United States. She made one voyage as a slave ship in between May 1803 and late 1804, when she was captured.
- Manuela, built as clipper ship Sunny South, captured by HMS Brisk in Mozambique Channel with over 800 slaves aboard.

Drawing of Marie Séraphique showing the slave deck and number of captives

- Marie Séraphique, French vessel sailing from Nantes
- Manuelita, Spanish slave ship carrying 485 Africans when captured by HMS Nimble 7 December 1833.
- Margaret Scott, confiscated and sunk as part of the Stone fleet in 1862
- Meermin, a Dutch East India Company ship active between southern Africa and Madagascar, whose final voyage in 1766 ended in mutiny by the slaves: around half the crew and nearly 30 Malagasy died, and the ship was destroyed.
- Midas, 360-ton Spanish slave ship captured by HMS Monkey 27 June 1829. Midas had left Africa in April 1829 with 562 Africans, but only 369 were still alive when she was captured, and 72 more died of "smallpox, diarrhea & scurvy" before Monkey and HMS Nimble could take Midas into Havana.
- Molly (1769 ship) was launched in 1769 at Liverpool. In 1776 she made one voyage as a slave ship. After, and possibly before, she was a West Indiaman. While sailing under a letter of marque, she captured some notable prizes. Two French frigates captured her on 4 September 1782.
- Molly was launched in Liverpool in 1775 as Badger. Badger made one voyage as a slave ship. New owners renamed her Molly in 1778 and sailed her as a West Indiaman. In 1779 she repelled an American privateer in a sanguinary single ship action. Her owners renamed her Lydia. While trading with Tortola she captured one or two prizes. Lydia was herself captured in 1782.
- Molly (1778 ship) was launched at Liverpool in 1778 as a slave ship. Between 1778 and 1807 she made 18 complete voyages as a slave ship. During this period she also suffered one major maritime incident and captured two ships. After the end of Britain's involvement in the trans-Atlantic slave trade, Molly became a merchantman trading with the West Indies, Africa, Brazil, Nova Scotia, and Africa again. She was last listed in 1832, giving her a 54-year career.
- Nancy 1793 voyage John B. Cook, master in which the slaves revolted
- Nightingale, clipper ship captured by Saratoga near Cabinda, Angola in 1861 with 961 slaves aboard.
- Nile (1800 ship) was built in Spain in 1786 and was taken in prize. She first appears in readily accessible British records in 1800. She made two complete voyages as a slave ship, foundering on her third after having disembarked her slaves.
- Nile (1802 ship) was launched at Nantes in 1795 and was captured or purchased from the French in 1802. She then made four voyages as a slave ship. Between her first and second slave trading voyages she cruised for less than a year as a privateer. With the abolition in 1807 of the slave trade, Nile became a regular merchantman, but now trading with Africa. She was sold in Barbados in 1811.
- Pons, American-built barque captured by USS Yorktown on 1 December 1845 with 850–900 slaves.
- Progresso, a Brazilian brigantine, was captured on 2 April 1843 by HMS Cleopatra off Quelimane, Mozambique with 440 slaves. She was purchased by the British navy on 23 April 1844, converted to the tank (water) vessel YC.1 at the Cape of Good Hope Station, and broken up in March 1869.
- Providencia, Spanish brig carrying 400 slaves when captured by HMS Monkey in 1829.
- Robust (1782 ship) was built in France in 1779. The British captured her in 1781 and in 1789 she was a whaler in the northern whale fishery (Greenland and Davis Strait). Then in December 1788 she left on the first of three voyages as a slave ship. On her third voyage as a slave ship Robust captured a French slave ship and recaptured two British slave ships that a French privateer had captured earlier. After her third voyage as a slaver owners shifted her registry to Bristol and she then made two voyages to the southern whale fishery. She returned from the second voyage in 1797 and is last listed in 1798.
- French corvette Robuste was a vessel built at Nantes in 1789 as a slave ship that made her first and only slave-trading voyage in 1789–90. The French navy purchased her in December 1793 and she served as a 22-gun corvette in the Channel. The British captured her in 1796 and took her into the Royal Navy as HMS Scourge. She captured a number of French privateers, primarily in the West Indies, before the navy sold her in 1802.
- São José Paquete Africa, a Portuguese slave ship which sank off the coast of South Africa in 1794 killing over 200 of the enslaved men and women.
- Saphir, french slaver, 18th century.
- Sarah (1797 ship) was launched at Liverpool. She then made six voyages carrying slaves from West Africa to the West Indies. A French privateer captured Sarah in 1803 on her seventh voyage.
- Sarah (1798 ship) was launched in Spain in 1791, presumably under another name. The British captured her c. 1798. She made five voyages as a slave ship before a Spanish privateer captured her in 1805. On her fourth voyage Sarah had captured two French slave ships at Loanga.
- Sarah (1803 ship) was launched at Liverpool. She made a short voyage as a privateer during which she captured a valuable prize. She then made two voyages as a slave ship. A French naval squadron captured her early in her third slaving voyage.
- Tecora, Portuguese slave ship that transported the slaves who would later revolt aboard La Amistad.
- Thames (1790 ship) was launched at Southampton in 1790. Until 1798 she sailed across the Atlantic, trading primarily with The Bahamas. She then made seven slave trading voyages. After the abolition of the British slave trade in 1807, Thames returned to trading with the West Indies. A French privateer captured Thames on 17 July 1811 and burnt her.
- Thames (1794 ship) was launched in London. The French captured her in late 1795, but the British Royal Navy recaptured her within weeks. She then disappeared from the Registers for some years. She reappeared as Thames in 1800, sailing as a West Indiaman. In 1802 she made one full voyage as a slave ship. French privateers captured her in 1805 after she had gathered slaves in West Africa but before she could deliver them to a port in the British Caribbean.
- Theophilus Chase was a brig, sailing under the USA flag in 1840. Captain Coffin, Master, purchased 673 enslaved captives in Gallinhas and transported them to Havana, Cuba. The journey took a total of 153 days, beginning on March 3, 1840 During the transport, 115 enslaved people died. The 558 captives who survived the journey disembarked at Havana, Cuba on August 13, 1840. The voyage was "completed as intended" and the enslaved captives were delivered to their owners. One month later, the Boston Post newspaper reported the death of the new master of the brig Theophilus Chase, Capt. John Hansford, from fever on the coast of Africa. The following day, The Baltimore Sun reported that Capt. Frailey "arrived at Havanna last month in the brig Theophilus Chase, from Africa -- his vessel having been taken possession of by the mate while he was ashore."
- Triton captured off Loango on 16 July 1860 by Mystic, and 20 May 1861 off Kongo by USS Constellation.
- Trouvadore, wrecked in Turks and Caicos 1841. 193 slaves survived. Project commenced in 2004 to locate the ship.
- Vulture (1779 ship) was launched in France in 1777, captured, and became first a Liverpool privateer and then slave ship. She made some 10 voyages carrying slaves until the French captured her in 1794 early into her eleventh such voyage.
- Wanderer, formerly last slave ship to the U.S. (November 1858) until Clotilda reported in 1859 or 1860.
- Wildfire, a barque, arrested off the Florida coast by the US Navy in 1860; carrying 450 slaves.
- Whydah Gally, a ship that transported cargo, passengers, and slaves. Captured by the pirate Captain Samuel Bellamy and used for piracy, eventually grounded during a Nor'easter at Cape Cod and sunk in April 1717.
- Young Dick was a schooner built in France in 1796 that the British took in prize. Captain Archibald Smith acquired a letter of marque on 19 August 1797. She was of 84 tons burthen, was armed with twelve 3&4-pounder guns, and had a crew of 19. Smith sailed on 28 August and reached Africa. She was reported to have fully embarked captives (estimated at 140), when in February 1798 a Spanish privateer of 16 guns and 120 men captured her. However, by April 1798 she had arrived at Demerara. She was last listed in 1798.
- Zong, a British slave ship infamous for the 1781 massacre of 132 sick and dying slaves who the captain threw overboard in an attempt to guarantee that the ship's owners could collect on their cargo insurance.
