= List of shipwrecks in December 1827 =

The list of shipwrecks in December 1827 includes some ships sunk, foundered, grounded, or otherwise lost during December 1827.

== 1 December ==
List of shipwrecks: 1 December 1827
Ship	State	Description
Albion	United Kingdom	The smack was driven ashore at Forvie, Aberdeenshire with the loss of at least four lives. She was on a voyage from London to Peterhead, Aberdeenshire.
Charlotte	United Kingdom	The ship was wrecked on Jersey, Channel Islands. All fourteen people on board were rescued. She was on a voyage from Jamaica to London.
Friendship	United Kingdom	The brig foundered in the North Sea 2 nautical miles (3.7 km) off the mouth of the River Don with the loss of all hands. She was on a voyage from Sunderland, County Durham to the Moray Firth.
Sisters	United Kingdom	The ship was driven ashore and wrecked at Bervie, Aberdeenshire with the loss of all hands.
Stirling Castle	United Kingdom	The ship was driven ashore and wrecked at Veere, Zeeland, Netherlands. She was on a voyage from Bristol, Gloucestershire to Rotterdam, South Holland, Netherlands.
Ville D'Auray	United Kingdom	The ship was driven ashore at "Ajon". She was on a voyage from Marseille, Bouches-du-Rhône to Rouen, Seine-Inférieure.

== 2 December ==
List of shipwrecks: 2 December 1827
Ship	State	Description
Margaret and Mary	United Kingdom	The ship foundered in the Irish Sea off the coast of Anglesey with the loss of all hands. She was on a voyage from Newry, County Antrim to Liverpool, Lancashire.

== 3 December ==
List of shipwrecks: 3 December 1827
Ship	State	Description
Ann and Sarah	United Kingdom	The snow ran aground and was wrecked on the Bondicar Rocks, in the North Sea off the coast of County Durham. She was on a voyage from Hamburg to South Shields, County Durham.
Lottery	United Kingdom	The ship foundered in The Wash off King's Lynn, Norfolk. Her crew were rescued.

== 4 December ==
List of shipwrecks: 4 December 1827
Ship	State	Description
Albion Packet	United Kingdom	The ship was driven ashore and severely damaged at Cuxhaven, Kingdom of Hanover. She was on a voyage from Hamburg to Newcastle upon Tyne, Northumberland. She was later refloated.
Murray	United Kingdom	The ship was wrecked near Ilfracombe, Devon. Her crew were rescued. She was on a voyage from Youghal, County Cork to Bristol, Gloucestershire.

== 5 December ==
List of shipwrecks: 5 December 1827
Ship	State	Description
Constance	flag unknown	The ship was wrecked off Heligoland. She was on a voyage from Bahia, Brazil to Hamburg and Bremen. Her crew were rescued.
David Malcolm	United Kingdom	The ship was wrecked at Madras, India.
Felicitas	United Kingdom	The ship was wrecked at Madras.
Gunjava	United Kingdom	The ship was wrecked at Madras.
Hope	United Kingdom	The ship was wrecked at Madras. She was on a voyage from London to Penang, China.
Malabar	United Kingdom	The ship was driven out to sea from Madras, presumed subsequently foundered.
Mary and Ann	United Kingdom	The ship was abandoned in the North Sea off Flamborough Head, Yorkshire. She was on a voyage from Newcastle upon Tyne, Northumberland to Wells-next-the-Sea, Norfolk.
Security	United Kingdom	The ship was wrecked at Madras. She was on a voyage from London to Penang.
Spring	United Kingdom	The brig was driven ashore and wrecked at Pagham, Sussex. She was on a voyage from Bombay, India to London.
Waterloo	United Kingdom	The ship was wrecked at Madras.

== 6 December ==
List of shipwrecks: 6 December 1827
Ship	State	Description
Caspian	United Kingdom	The ship was wrecked on the Haisborough Sands, in the North Sea off the coast of Norfolk. Her crew were rescued. She was on a voyage from London to Newcastle upon Tyne, Northumberland.
Ceres	United Kingdom	The brig was driven ashore and wrecked near Wainfleet, Lincolnshire with the loss of all hands.
ARA Congress	Argentine Navy	The Brig of War ran aground at Point Lara Ensidnada. She was attacked by a Brazilian Navy squadron the next day and destroyed by fire with the loss of about 30 of her crew.
Hope	United Kingdom	The ship was driven ashore and wrecked at Calcutta, India.
Liberty	United Kingdom	The ship was wrecked on the Shipwash Sand, in the North Sea off the coast of Suffolk. Her crew were rescued.

== 7 December ==
List of shipwrecks: 7 December 1827
Ship	State	Description
City of Limerick	United Kingdom	The ship was wrecked at Portland, Dorset.
Luise	United States	The ship was driven ashore on "Meyer's Leegte". Her crew were rescued. She was on a voyage from Baltimore, Maryland to Bremen.
Trial	United Kingdom	The ship was wrecked near Rye, Sussex with the loss of all hands.

== 8 December ==
List of shipwrecks: 8 December 1827
Ship	State	Description
Albion	United Kingdom	The sloop was driven ashore and wrecked at the mouth of the River Ythan with the loss of all four of her crew.
Belfast	United Kingdom	The ship was abandoned in the Atlantic Ocean. All on board were rescued. She was on a voyage from Belfast, County Antrim to Savannah, Georgia, United States.
Liberty	United Kingdom	The ship was wrecked on the Shipwash Sand, in the North Sea off the coast of Suffolk.
Neptune	(United Kingdom of Great Britain and Ireland) Guernsey	The ship was wrecked near Jersey, Channel Islands. She was on a voyage from "Gasper" to Guernsey.

== 9 December ==
List of shipwrecks: 9 December 1827
Ship	State	Description
Albion	United Kingdom	The ship was destroyed by fire in the English Channel off Hastings, Sussex. She was on a voyage from London to Livorno, Grand Duchy of Tuscany.

== 11 December ==
List of shipwrecks: 11 December 1827
Ship	State	Description
Dichos	Spain	The ship was driven ashore at Gibraltar. She had been refloated by 19 December.
Elfreda	United Kingdom	The ship was driven ashore at Gibraltar. She had been refloated by 19 December.
Footroendet	flag unknown	The ship was wrecked at Douglas, Isle of Man. She was on a voyage from Marseille, Bouches-du-Rhône, France to the Clyde.
Golden Grove	United Kingdom	The ship was driven ashore at Gibraltar. She had been refloated by 19 December.
Tryphina	United Kingdom	The ship was wrecked on the Goodwin Sands, Kent with the loss of all but one of her crew.
Vizentia	Spain	The ship was driven ashore at Gibraltar. She had been refloated by 19 December.

== 12 December ==
List of shipwrecks: 12 December 1827
Ship	State	Description
Gawrie	United Kingdom	The ship was driven ashore near Belfast, County Antrim. She was on a voyage from Dublin to Belfast.
General Bolivar	United Kingdom	The ship was driven ashore near Málaga, Spain. She was on a voyage from Zante, Greece to Bristol, Gloucestershire.
Louisa	United States	The ship was driven ashore at "Meyers Legete". She was on a voyage from Baltimore, Maryland to Hamburg.
Wellington	United Kingdom	The brig was run down and sunk in The Wash off Boston, Lincolnshire by William and Mary (United Kingdom). Her crew survived.

== 13 December ==
List of shipwrecks: 13 December 1827
Ship	State	Description
Alexander	United Kingdom	The brig was driven ashore and wrecked at Drumroof, Dumfriesshire. Her crew survived. She was on a voyage from Quebec City, Lower Canada, British North America to Liverpool, Lancashire.
Favourite	United Kingdom	The ship was damaged in the Atlantic Ocean. All on board were taken off on 22 December by Atalanta (Netherlands). She was on a voyage from Newfoundland, British North America to Teignmouth, Devon
Nancy	United Kingdom	The ship was lost near Lancaster, Lancashire. She was on a voyage from Richibucto, New Brunswick, British North America to Lancaster.

== 14 December ==
List of shipwrecks: 14 December 1827
Ship	State	Description
Æolus	United Kingdom	The ship was wrecked on the Gunfleet Sand, in the North Sea off the coast of Suffolk. Her crew were rescued. She was on a voyage from London to Newcastle upon Tyne, Northumberland.
Avis	United Kingdom	The ship was run down and sunk in the North Sea off Hollesley Bay, Suffolk. Her crew were rescued.
Jane	United Kingdom	The ship was lost near Plymouth, Devon. All on board were rescued. She was on a voyage from Liverpool, Lancashire to London.
Lark	United Kingdom	The ship was wrecked near Dartmouth, Devon. Her crew were rescued. She was on a voyage from Jersey, Channel Islands to Dartmouth.
Margaret	United Kingdom	The ship was wrecked near Dundee, Forfarshire. Her crew were rescued. She was on a voyage from Riga, Russia to the Clyde.
Rover	United Kingdom	The ship was driven ashore and wrecked near Hastings, Sussex with the loss of her captain. She was on a voyage from Folkestone, Kent to Exeter, Devon.
Thetis	United Kingdom	The ship was driven ashore and wrecked at Newhaven, Sussex. She was on a voyage from Sunderland, County Durham to Brighton, Sussex.

== 15 December ==
List of shipwrecks: 15 December 1827
Ship	State	Description
Minerva	United Kingdom	The ship struck a sunken rock and foundered off the Isle of Islay with the loss of three of her crew. She was on a voyage from Dublin to London.
Science	United Kingdom	The ship was lost off Eierland, North Holland, Netherlands. All on board survived. She was on a voyage from London to Hamburg.

== 16 December ==
List of shipwrecks: 16 December 1827
Ship	State	Description
Reward	United Kingdom	The ship was lost off the Caicos Islands. She was on a voyage from Quebec City, Lower Canada, British North America to Jamaica.

== 17 December ==
List of shipwrecks: 17 December 1827
Ship	State	Description
Gourie	United Kingdom	The sloop was driven ashore at Ardglass, County Down. She was on a voyage from Dublin to Newcastle upon Tyne, Northumberland
Vine	United Kingdom	The ship was run down and sunk in the North Sea off Sizewell, Suffolk by Brothers (United Kingdom). Her crew were rescued.
William	United Kingdom	The barque was driven ashore and wrecked at Heysham, Lancashire. Her five crew survives. She was on a voyage from Larne, County Antrim to Liverpool, Lancashire.

== 18 December ==
List of shipwrecks: 18 December 1827
Ship	State	Description
Ann	United Kingdom	The ship was wrecked on the Morant Keys. She was on a voyage from Jamaica to Halifax, Nova Scotia, British North America.
Brothers	United Kingdom	The ship ran aground on the Gunfleet Sand, in the North Sea off the coast of Essex. She floated off on 8 January 1828 and was taken in to Brightlingsea, Essex.
Express	United Kingdom	The ship sank at Ballina, County Mayo.
Jane	United Kingdom	The ship was driven ashore and wrecked in Whitsand Bay. Her crew were rescued. She was on a voyage from Lisbon, Portugal to London.
Vine	United Kingdom	The ship was run down and sunk in the North Sea off Sizewell, Suffolk by Brothers (United Kingdom). Her crew were rescued.

== 19 December ==
List of shipwrecks: 19 December 1827
Ship	State	Description
Guerrero	Spain	Atlantic Slave Trade: The privateer, a hermaphrodite brig, was wrecked on the Carysfort Reef, in the Atlantic Ocean off Key Largo, Florida, United States whilst trying to avoid capture by HMS Nimble (Royal Navy). A total of 41 of the 561 slaves on board were lost. She was on a voyage from Havana, Cuba to an African port.
HMS Nimble	Royal Navy	The schooner ran aground on the Carysfort reef whilst trying to capture Guerrero (ship) (Spain). She was refloated, repaired and returned to service.

== 20 December ==
List of shipwrecks: 20 December 1827
Ship	State	Description
Hope	United Kingdom	The ship sank on Scroby Sands, Norfolk.

== 21 December ==
List of shipwrecks: 21 December 1827
Ship	State	Description
Augusta	Kingdom of the Two Sicilies	The ship was sunk by ice at Reval, Russia.

== 22 December ==
List of shipwrecks: 22 December 1827
Ship	State	Description
Myrtle	United Kingdom	The ship capsized and sank in Labesheda Bay in a squall. She was on a voyage from Limerick to Glasgow, Renfrewshire.

== 23 December ==
List of shipwrecks: 23 December 1827
Ship	State	Description
Jasper	United Kingdom	The ship was driven ashore and wrecked at Aldeburgh, Suffolk. She was on a voyage from Newcastle upon Tyne, Northumberland to London.

== 24 December ==
List of shipwrecks: 24 December 1827
Ship	State	Description
Agnes	United Kingdom	The ship was driven ashore crewless at Bispham, Lancashire. She was on a voyage from Kirkcudbright to Liverpool, Lancashire.
Marchioness Wellesley	United Kingdom	The steamship ran aground at Wexford. All on board were rescued. She had been refloated by 11 January 1828 and taken in to Wexford Harbour.

== 25 December ==
List of shipwrecks: 25 December 1827
Ship	State	Description
Ann Brunette	United Kingdom	The ship foundered in the Irish Sea off Port St. Mary, Isle of Man. Her crew were rescued. She was on a voyage from Londonderry to Liverpool, Lancashire.
Cherub	(United Kingdom of Great Britain and Ireland) British North America	The brig was wrecked on Bimini, Bahamas. Her crew were rescued.

== 30 December ==
List of shipwrecks: 30 December 1827
Ship	State	Description
Countess of Liverpool	United Kingdom	The brig was wrecked on The Skerries, Anglesey. All on board were rescued. She was on a voyage from Liverpool, Lancashire to Montevideo, Uruguay.

== Unknown date ==
List of shipwrecks: Unknown date in December 1827
Ship	State	Description
Alexander	United Kingdom	The ship was driven ashore and wrecked at Robin Rigg, Cumberland. All on board survived. She was on a voyage from Quebec City, Lower Canada, British North America to Liverpool, Lancashire.
Belfast	United Kingdom	The ship was abandoned in the Atlantic Ocean 200 nautical miles (370 km) off the coast of New York, United States. She subsequently foundered, Bekfast was on a voyage from the Clyde to New York City.
Drey Gebruder	Bremen	The ship foundered off Baltrum, Kingdom of Hanover. She was on a voyage from Liverpool to Bremen.
Gowrie	United Kingdom	The ship was driven ashore near Ardglass, County Antrim before 17 December. She was subsequently wrecked. Gowrie was on a voyage from Dublin to Newcastle upon Tyne, Northumberland.
Imperial	flag unknown	The ship was driven ashore and wrecked at La Rochelle, Charente-Maritime, France before 17 December.
La Seine	France	The brig was wrecked on the coast of Jutland.
Liberty	United Kingdom	The ship was wrecked on the Shipwash Sand, in the North Sea off the coast of Essex before 10 December.
Marquis Wellesley	United Kingdom	The steamship was driven ashore at Wexford before 25 December.
Utility	United Kingdom	The ship was lost in the Grand Banks of Newfoundland with the loss of all hands.
Wellington	United Kingdom	The ship was run down and sunk in the North Sea off Scarborough, North Riding of Yorkshire. Her crew were rescued. She was on a voyage from Sunderland, County Durham to London.
Wilhelmina	Hamburg	The ship was abandoned in the Atlantic Ocean, She was on a voyage from St. Ubes, Spain to New York, United States.
