= Guerrero (ship) =

Spanish slave ship

History

United States
- Name: James Monroe
- Owner: Daniel Sullivan, Rennselaer Havens, and Frederick Jenkins
- Port of registry: New York City
- Builder: Amasa Miller, New London, Connecticut
- Launched: 1813
- Notes: Privateer in War of 1812

Spain
- Renamed: San Jose
- Notes: slave runner/pirate
- Name: Pepe (1826)
- Renamed: Guerrero (1827)
- Fate: Wrecked 19 December 1827

General characteristics
- Tons burthen: 32338/95 (bm)
- Length: 110 ft 2 in (33.6 m)
- Beam: 27 ft 5 in (8.4 m)
- Draft: 11 ft 11 1/2 in (3.6 m)
- Sail plan: Hermaphrodite brig
- Complement: 1813: 50; 1827: 97
- Armament: 1813: 6 × 9-pounder + 1 × 24-pounder "long tom" guns; 1827: 14 × 12-pounder guns

Guerrero was a Spanish slave ship that wrecked in 1827 on a reef near the Florida Keys with 561 Africans aboard. Forty-one of the Africans drowned in the wreck. Guerrero had been engaged in a battle with a British anti-slavery patrol ship, HMS Nimble, stationed on the northern approaches to Cuba. Nimble also ran onto the reef, but was refloated and returned to service. The two ships were attended by wreckers, who rescued the Spanish crew and surviving Africans from their ship and helped refloat Nimble. Spanish crew members hijacked two of the wrecking vessels and took almost 400 Africans to Cuba, where they were sold as slaves. Most of the remaining Africans were eventually returned to Africa.

== History ==
The history of the ship is unclear. Because the slave trade to Cuba was illegal in the 1820s, ships that successfully delivered a cargo of captives from Africa to Cuba were often destroyed or registered under a new name to avoid confiscation by the Spanish authorities. The British Consul in Santiago, Cape Verde reported in 1827 that the ship then known as Guerrero was the former James Monroe, which was launched in 1813 in New London, Connecticut, and which had served as a letter of marque during the War of 1812. James Monroe made two trading voyages to France during the war, capturing a total of six British ships on those voyages. It made at least two more crossings to France after the end the war. Its later history is unclear, in part because a number of American ships were named for James Monroe after he became President of the United States in 1817.

The ship known in 1827 as Guerrero was heavily armed. She carried four long brass and ten iron 12-pounder guns, and carried a crew of 90 or more men. Such large, well-armed slave ships often engaged in piracy, robbing smaller ships of their cargoes, including slaves. Prior to 1826 the ship was known as San Jose. In June 1826 a brig then known as Pepe, likely the ship later known as Guerrero, sailed from Havana for Africa. A few days later a "Spanish" brig stopped and robbed a sloop on its way from Bermuda to Norfolk, Virginia. Late in July what probably was the same brig robbed two American ships anchored at Cape Mesurado in Liberia. Two British warships were dispatched to catch the pirate ship, now identified as Pepe. The British ships caught up to Pepe, but it managed to escape during a heavy rainstorm. Pepe loaded about 600 Africans at Gallinas (near the border between present day Sierra Leone and Liberia) and delivered about 570 of them to Cuba late in the year.

== Last voyage ==
On 14 July 1827 Guerrero sailed from Havana for Africa. Her departure was noted (along with that of several other suspected slave ships) by British commissioners in Havana. About 700 Africans, some of whom may have been forcibly taken from other slave ships, were on Guerrero when it sailed from Africa for Cuba. On 19 December 1827 Guerrero was sailing south towards Cuba in the Florida Straits carrying 561 Africans who had survived the voyage when it was spotted by HMS Nimble near Orange Cay (on the Great Bahama Bank). Nimble was smaller and more lightly armed (crew of 56, with, by various reports, eight, five or just three guns) than Guerrero. (Note: Swanson states that one source says "8 guns", while another says "two gunades and an 18-pounder on a swivel"; O'Byrne states "5 guns". For swivel read "on a centre-line pivot" that enabled the gun to fire on either side.) Nimble fired two shots to order the suspected slave ship to stop for inspection, but Guerrero ran, starting a five-hour chase during which the weather turned bad and night came on. As Nimble closed the distance between the ships they commenced firing at each other. The crew on the lightship Caesar, stationed on Carysfort Reef near Key Largo, could see and hear the battle, which appeared to be about ten miles away.

After a half-hour of battle Guerrero appeared to signal that it was surrendering, but then tried to run off. Nimble resumed the pursuit, even though the ships were entering shallower water. At about 7:30 PM Guerrero hit a reef while sailing at close to ten knots. The impact tore the hull open and toppled the masts. Forty-one of the Africans confined in the hold were drowned as Guerrero sank. Nimble tried to turn away, but five minutes later it also ran onto a reef. Although its crew managed to get Nimble off the reef, it drifted back onto the reef, and a receding tide left it there, about two-and-one-half miles (four km) from the wreck of Guerrero.

== Rescue ==
The next morning, 20 December 1827, wreckers on the schooner Thorn and sloop Surprize, who had anchored overnight in Caesar Creek, (Note: Also called Black Caesar's Creek. It connects the Atlantic Ocean to Biscayne Bay between Elliott Key and Old Rhodes Key) saw the two ships on the reef and went to their aid. They were soon joined by the fishing smack Florida, and later by other wreckers. When the wreckers reached Guerrero, her captain, Joze Gomez, requested that the American flag be raised on the wrecked ship, indicating that it was an American prize, and not taken by the British Nimble. On the other hand, Lt. Edward Holland, commander of Nimble, insisted that Guerrero had surrendered before the ships hit the reef, and was therefore a British prize.

Nimble had lost its rudder, and had to be lightened and towed off the reef. The pivot gun was transferred to one of the wreckers and cannonballs and ballast thrown overboard. The crewmen and surviving Africans on Guerrero were loaded onto several of the wreckers. Florida took 20 of the Spanish crewmen and 142 Africans aboard and immediately departed for Key West. Before reaching there, however, the Spanish crewmen from Guerrero hijacked Florida and sailed it and the 142 Africans to Cuba. Thorn took 54 of the Spanish crewmen and 246 Africans, including all of the women. Thorn had not left by late afternoon, and Lt. Bolton requested that it anchor close to Nimble overnight so that the warship could help protect the wrecker from the Spanish crewmen on it. Even so, the Spanish crewmen hijacked Thorn from under the guns of Nimble and took it and the 246 Africans aboard to Cuba.

Surprize, which had taken on 12 of the Spanish crewmen and 122 Africans, anchored for the night near the wreck of Guerrero in the company of two other wreckers, the sloop Capital and schooner General Geddes. John Morrison, captain of General Geddes, later testified that he was fearful of the intentions of the Spanish crewmen, and had ordered his own crew to arm themselves so that they could protect both Surprize and his ship from any attempt by the Spanish to seize them. The next morning Surprize approached Nimble and transferred ten of the Spanish crewmen to it (Nimble already had another ten Spanish crewmen aboard), leaving only two on Surprize, and then sailed for Key West. Capital and General Geddes helped salvage the rudder from Guerrero and mount it on Nimble. The three ships then sailed for Key West.

== Disputes ==
Nimble, Capital and General Geddes reached Key West on 24 December and Florida and Thorn returned from Cuba the next day, their crews having been released unharmed. One of the Africans on Surprize died before reaching Key West, so 121 were unloaded there. Lt. Holden claimed that the Africans were under his protection because Guerrero had surrendered to him. The Collector of Customs for the port claimed custody of the Africans because they had been landed in American territory after being shipwrecked. The wreckers claimed salvage on Nimble for helping to get it off the reef and replace the rudder. Lt. Holden refused to submit to the arbitration procedure established by Florida territorial law, which would have let a panel of local residents, almost all of whom had a financial stake in wrecking, decide how much in salvage fees were due the wreckers. Nimble left Key West without the Africans, and the wreckers remained unpaid. Nimble delivered the 20 Cuban crewmen it was holding to Havana to be dealt with by the British-Spanish Mixed Commission Court that dealt with Spanish slave-runners caught near Cuba.

== Transfer to St. Augustine ==
The 121 Africans presented a problem to Key West, which had only some 420 residents. In response to a rumor that a ship was being prepared in Cuba to attack Key West and take the Africans, Key West prepared to defend itself. There were also attempts by Americans to take by force or by bribery part or all of the Africans. After seven weeks, in March 1828, the Africans were transferred to St. Augustine, and delivered into the custody of the U.S. Marshal for the Eastern District of Florida, Waters Smith. Only 114 reached St. Augustine. Six had died in Key West, and one was kept by the captain of the revenue cutter that escorted the ship carrying the Africans to St. Augustine.

One of the Africans, named Lewis, was not a captive, but had been hired as an interpreter by the captain of Guerrero. Lewis had been to Havana on at least one earlier slave ship. He had also brought his son with him, and asked that he and his son be released to go to Havana so that he could collect his wages. Lewis was eventually released, but his son was not.

== Uncertain status ==
Although he expected to be eventually reimbursed, Waters Smith had to pay for the care of the Africans from his own pocket. (In the end, Smith was reimbursed for only part of what he had spent, and he had to mortgage his home to cover the rest.) To partially cover his expenses, he hired the Africans out to plantation owners at two dollars per month each. Boys too young for field work were placed as servants in private homes. Several of the men were blind or sick, and could not be put to work. At this point the condition of the Africans rescued from Guerrero was indistinguishable from slavery. The Africans were in a legal limbo. There were laws covering Africans seized while being illegally imported into the United States, but they did not apply to Africans who entered the country accidentally. In April 1828 President John Quincy Adams requested Congress to pass a supplementary law dealing with the Guerrero Africans, but it failed to act. A year later, in March 1829, Congress appropriated funds to reimburse Waters Smith and transport the Guerrero Africans to Liberia.

== Return to Africa ==
A ship to transport the Africans to Liberia was engaged in June, 1829, and Waters Smith was ordered to prepare the Africans for embarkation. There were delays when the ship had to be replaced, and the departure point for the Africans was moved from St. Augustine to Fernandina, Florida. Smith had problems gathering the Africans. He had rented 36 of the Africans to Zephaniah Kingsley and another 20 to Joseph Marion Hernández. When Smith called for the hired-out Africans to be returned to him so that they could be shipped to Africa, Kingsley and Hernandez refused to do so, based on an opinion by the Collector of Customs for St. Augustine that the Africans were free men and therefore Smith had no authority to hire them out as slaves or to remove them from the possession of Kingsley and Hernandez and order them sent to Africa. Smith was able to bring the Africans into Fernandina, "[p]artly by force and partly by persuasion". Hernández never paid any of the money he owed Smith for the 20 Africans he had rented. Smith also paid Seminoles to bring in some of the Africans that had run away from Kingsley's and Hernández' plantations. Smith felt that he had to stay on guard in Fernandina because he suspected that slave dealers were planning to steal some of the Africans to carry them away for sale as slaves.

After further delays, 100 of the Africans were boarded on Washington's Barge, which sailed on 30 September 1829. (Some of the Africans had died, and some were too ill to travel. Two boys were kept back because they had yaws.) On 31 December 1829 Washington's Barge arrived in Barbados, badly damaged and out of drinking water. Five of the Guerrero Africans had died since leaving Fernandina. The Africans were transferred to the brig Heroine, which sailed on 16 January 1830 and arrived in Liberia 4 March 1830. They were settled in New Georgia, a town a few miles from Monrovia, where they joined people who had been recaptured from the slave ship Antelope by the U.S. Revenue Cutter Dallas in 1820 and sent to Liberia in 1827.

== Search for wreck site ==
Archaeologists have searched for the sites of the sunken Guerrero and grounding of Nimble. One area of interest was the entrance to Turtle Harbor, four miles east of the northern end of Key Largo and three and a half miles north of the Carysfort Reef Light. Artifacts found in a search of the area from 2003 to 2006 did not specifically identify any ship. Swanson maintained that the wreck sites were likely further north, near Pacific Reef. One problem was that various accounts placed the wreck sites at six to ten miles from the Carysfort Reef lightship, but the position of that lightship is not well established (contemporary sources vary wildly, even putting the lightship inland). A documentary about the search for the Guerrero wreck site narrated by James Avery, The Guerrero Project, was produced in 2004.

In August 2015 the Diving With a Purpose underwater archaeology program in conjunction with the National Park Service and the National Association of Black Scuba Divers announced they believe the wreck has been located on the reef off the coast of Key Largo, Fl. Underwater excavations in 2010 and 2012 by the Mel Fisher Maritime Heritage Society and the National Oceanic and Atmospheric Administration identified the wreck through a cologne bottle from the early 1800s, bone china, lead shot, blue-edged earthenware, metal rigging, copper fasteners, and wooden plank fragments recovered from the wreck site. As of 2023 the ship had not been located.
