= HMS Winchester (1693) =

Ship of the line of the Royal Navy

History

England
- Name: HMS Winchester
- Builder: Wyatt, Bursledon
- Launched: 11 April 1693
- Fate: Foundered, 24 September 1695

General characteristics
- Class & type: 60-gun fourth rate ship of the line
- Tons burthen: 941
- Length: 146 ft 2.5 in (44.6 m) (gundeck)
- Beam: 38 ft 2 in (11.6 m)
- Depth of hold: 15 ft 11 in (4.9 m)
- Propulsion: Sails
- Sail plan: Full-rigged ship
- Armament: 60 guns of various weights of shot

HMS Winchester was a 60-gun fourth rate ship of the line of the English Royal Navy, launched at Bursledon on 11 April 1693.

On 24 September 1695, Winchester foundered on Carysfort Reef in the Florida Keys and was lost. Scurvy had killed or incapacitated almost all of the 350 crewmen; only seven were still capable of working the bilge pumps when a hurricane drove the Winchester onto the reef. Just eight of the crew were rescued. Winchester had been in company with Dunkirk and Experiment, when poor weather caused them to separate from the English squadron sailing from the West Indies to England. In the night lookouts sighted breakers ahead, but her crew was so debilitated by disease that she was unable to avoid hitting a reef. Captain Soales died on shore some days later, before being rescued. The subsequent court martial judged that the current had sent them further north than calculated.

The remains of the wreck were discovered in 1938 or 1939 lying approximately 1.5 miles (2.4 km) southwest of the Carysfort Reef Light. Cannons, cannonballs, wrought iron fittings, and a couple of sundials have been recovered from the wreck.
