= L'Aurore (disambiguation) =

L'Aurore (French for 'The Dawn'; IPA: [loʁɔʁ]) is a French newspaper published in the period 1897–1916. There are other publications with the same name:

- L'Aurore (1909-1941), a French publication published first in Istanbul and then in Cairo
- L'Aurore (newspaper founded 1944), a French newspaper
- L'Aurore boréale, a Canadian bi-weekly newspaper based in Whitehorse, Yukon
- L’Aurore, a slave ship from France that left for present-day Haiti.

== See also ==
- L'Aurore, an oil painting by William-Adolphe Bouguereau
