= General Keppel =

General Keppel may refer to:

- George Keppel, 3rd Earl of Albemarle (1724–1772), British Army colonel general
- George Keppel, 6th Earl of Albemarle (1799–1891), British Army general
- William Keppel (British Army officer, born 1727) (1727–1782), British Army lieutenant general
- William Keppel (British Army officer, died 1834), British Army general

== See also ==
- Willem van Keppel, 2nd Earl of Albemarle (1702–1754), British lieutenant general

== Other ==
- General Keppel – A British privateer (1799–1801)
