= General Keppel (1799 ship) =

British privateer (1799–1801)

History

Great Britain
- Name: Lune
- Launched: 1794, New Brunswick
- Captured: 1800

General characteristics
- Tons burthen: 202, (bm)
- Sail plan: Brig
- Complement: 1799: 60; 1801: 30
- Armament: 1799: 18 × 9&18-pounder cannons; 1801: 16 × 9&18-pounder guns + 4 × 32-pounder carronades
- Notes: Clinker-built

General Keppel was launched in 1779, possibly under another name. She first appeared in British records in 1799 as a Liverpool-based privateer. A Spanish frigate captured her in 1801.

== Career ==
General Keppel first appeared in Lloyd's Register (LR) in 1799.

Year	Master	Owner	Trade	Source & notes
1799	J.Smith	A.Joseph	Liverpool privateer	LR

Captain John Smith acquired a letter of marque on 16 August 1799. At one point General Keppel, Smith, master, was at Gibraltar, having been dismasted.

While the slave ship Lune was on her way to Liverpool to Jamaica, a French privateer captured her. The same privateer had captured two other vessels of the Jamaica fleet. General Kepole recaptured Lune, which arrived at Liverpool on 19 September. A later mention in Lloyd's List stated that Lune had arrived at Liverpool with the Jamaica fleet, after having been recaptured by General Keppel.

Captain James Finlayson acquired a letter of marque on 21 March 1801. He recaptured an American ship, and brought a ship out from Cadiz. The ship from Cadiz was Amizad, Flora, master, which arrived at Madeira.

On 14 June Finlayson had an engagement with the French privateer Mouche, of 22 guns and 250 men, which was in company with her prize, Hiram, Keene, master, from Demerara to Madeira. Hiram, with 60 Frenchmen aboard, soon sheared off, and went into Teneriffe. Mouche too left after an engagement that left her second captain dead and several men wounded, and her hull, masts, sails, and rigging damaged. (Note: Hiram, Kean, master, Preston, owner, of 225 tons (bm), had been launched at Sunderland in 1784.)

== Fate ==
On 20 November 1801 the Spanish frigate Medea, of 40 or 44 guns, captured General Keppel in the Río de la Plata after a severe engagement that lasted three hours.
