= Carysfort Reef Light =

Lighthouse in Florida, US

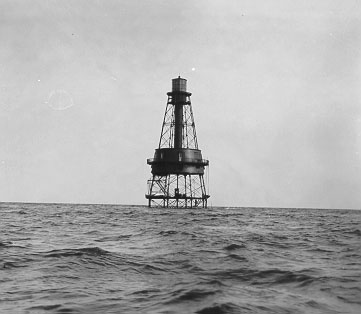
- Location: Carysfort Reef; Key Largo; Florida; United States
- Coordinates: 25°13′19.01″N 80°12′41.22″W

Tower
- Constructed: 1825 (lightships)
- Foundation: iron pile lighthouse
- Construction: wrought iron tower
- Automated: 1960
- Height: 120 feet (37 m)
- Shape: octagonal pyramidal skeletal tower with 2-story keeper's quarter, balcony and lantern
- Markings: red tower, white lantern and keeper's quarter roof
- Operator: United States Coast Guard
- Heritage: National Register of Historic Places listed place
- Racon: "C" (—·—·)

Light
- First lit: 1852 (current)
- Deactivated: 2015 (active as daybeacon)
- Focal height: 100 feet (30 m)
- Lens: 18 lamps with reflectors (1852), first order Fresnel lens (1858)
- Range: white: 15 nautical miles (28 km; 17 mi) red 13 nautical miles (24 km; 15 mi)
- Characteristic: Fl (3) W 60s. with red sectors
- Carysfort Lighthouse
- U.S. National Register of Historic Places
- Nearest city: Key Largo, Florida
- Area: 0.5 acres (0.20 ha)
- Built: 1848
- Built by: Merrick & Sons
- Engineer: Howard Stansbury, George Meade
- NRHP reference No.: 84000199
- Added to NRHP: October 31, 1984

Carysfort Reef Light is located on Carysfort Reef east of Key Largo, Florida. The lighthouse has an iron-pile foundation with a platform, and a skeletal, octagonal, pyramidal tower, which is painted red. The light was 100 feet (30 m) above the water. It was the oldest functioning lighthouse of its type in the United States until it was decommissioned in 2015, having been completed in 1852. The light last installed was a xenon flashtube beacon. It was added to the National Register of Historic Places in 1984.

== The reef ==
Carysfort Reef is named for HMS Carysfort (1766), a 28-gun Royal Navy post ship that ran aground on the reef in 1770. The reef is one of the most dangerous on the Florida Reef tract which parallels the Florida Keys. Of the 324 ships that were known to have wrecked on the Florida Reef from 1833 through 1841 (during the period the lightship Florida was stationed at the reef), 63 did so on Carysfort Reef. The United States Lighthouse Board reported that "Carysfort Reef picks up twenty percent of all the wrecks between Cape Florida and the Tortugas, a space of 200 miles (320 km)."

== Lightships ==
A survey of the Florida Keys in 1823 to locate sites for potential lighthouses and other aids to navigation produced a recommendation that a "floating light", or lightship, be placed on Carysfort Reef. Congress appropriated funds for the lightship in 1824, and a 220-ton schooner named Caesar was built in New York and launched in 1825. On its voyage to Florida to take up its position, the new ship went aground on the coast about 50 miles (80 km) north of Cape Florida, and was abandoned by its crew. The ship was recovered by wreckers and taken to Key West. The shipbuilder's agent bought the ship back for US$10,000, but it took a year to repair and refit it, and find a crew. The Caesar, under the command of lightship keeper John Whalton, reached its station and first lit its two lanterns in April 1826. The lightship was often blown off-station by storms, and even went aground on the reef at one point. Supplies, which had to be brought from Key West, were expensive, and shipments were irregular. To supplement food supplies, the crew kept a garden on Key Largo. They also cut firewood on the island. Drinking water depended on captured rain, water brought from springs near the mouth of the Miami River, and what could be bought from passing wreckers. On the evening of July 14, 1827, the tedium of the duty was broken as the crew of the Caesar witnessed a running battle between the Spanish-Cuban slave ship Guerrero and the British anti-slavery patrol ship HMS Nimble, which ended when both ships ran onto a reef about 10 nautical miles (19 km; 12 mi) away.

In 1830 Whalton became concerned about the condition of the Caesar, and sailed it to Key West for a survey. The ship was found to be "an entire mass of dry rot and fungus". The contract to build a replacement ship was awarded to the same builder that had built the Caesar. The new 225-ton ship was named Florida. It had two lanterns that were supposed to be visible for 12 nautical miles (22 km; 14 mi). The forward lantern was set at a height of 40 feet (12 m), the aft lantern 30 feet (9.1 m), above the water. Completed in November 1830, the Florida arrived on station early in 1831, with John Whalton as keeper.

Duty on a lightship far from any inhabited place was hard. Whalton's wife and children, who lived in Key West, would visit the lightship for a few days at a time. In September 1835, the Florida was severely damaged in a hurricane, with the lanterns broken, but the ship was repaired. Just three months later, the Second Seminole War began. Settlers on the south Florida mainland and the adjacent islands north of Indian Key fled to Key West. After the Cape Florida Lighthouse was burned by Seminoles in 1836, the Carysfort Reef lightship became the only navigational light on the Florida coast between St. Augustine and Key West. In October 1836, Seminoles burned the crew's garden on Key Largo. On June 23, 1837, Seminoles attacked Capt. Whalton and four of his helpers as they went ashore on Key Largo to tend their garden at Garden Cove. Capt. Whalton and one helper were killed, and two of the other three were wounded, but the three survivors managed to escape back to the ship, where the rest of the seven man crew awaited, along with Capt. Whalton's wife and daughter, who at the time were visiting from Key West. The bodies were recovered from the garden by wreckers, and buried on Indian Key. The Florida continued to serve as the lightship on Carysfort Reef until 1852, when a lighthouse was built on the reef.

Ship captains complained about the poor quality of the light provided by the lightships. Some complained that they had run onto a reef, because they thought they were 10 nautical miles (19 km; 12 mi) from the light, when they were only 2 or 3 nautical miles (3.7 or 5.6 km; 2.3 or 3.5 mi) away. Some captains thought that the lights on the lightship were deliberately dimmed or extinguished in collusion with wreckers. One captain reported rumors that oil for the lanterns was being traded to wreckers.

== New lighthouse ==
Congress appropriated funds for a lighthouse at Carysfort Reef in the 1840s. A wrought-iron skeletal tower on a screw-pile foundation using interchangeable parts, designed by I. W. P. Lewis, was manufactured in Philadelphia, Pennsylvania in 1848, and a construction crew was trained there, erecting the tower, and then disassembling it for shipping. The parts and the construction crew were sent to Florida by ship. The erection of the lighthouse was more difficult than expected. The site was under 4.5 feet (1.4 m) of water, and the reef was not solid, as expected, but consisted of a hard shell over calcareous sand. The screw piles were replaced with iron piles, coated with zinc to protect against corrosion, which were connected to large plates (totaling 130 square feet (12 m^{2})) to spread the weight of the lighthouse over a larger area of the reef.

Construction of the tower on the reef began in 1848, supervised by Captain Howard Stansbury (at the time, U.S. Army and Navy officers were assigned as lighthouse inspectors). He was replaced by Major Thomas Linnard, who died during the construction. In 1851, Lieutenant George Meade was assigned to complete the project. Meade had previously assisted in the design and construction of lighthouses in Delaware Bay, and surveyed and charted the Florida reefs, but this was his first command of a lighthouse project. Construction had originally been expected to be completed in a year, but funds had been held up while the U.S. Congress investigated the Lighthouse Service. After the necessary funds had been appropriated, Meade completed construction of the tower at the end of July 1852.

== Original light apparatus ==
The original light apparatus consisted of 18 lamps, each with a 21 inches (530 mm) diameter reflector. The light was intended to have a Fresnel lens, but the one ordered for Carysfort Reef had been stored at the New York Custom House while the lighthouse was under construction, and had been sold before completion of the lighthouse. Meade was forced to use a catoptric reflector system. He worked to optimize the systrem provided, adjusting it and adding mirrors. The Carysfort Reef Light was fixed (not revolving). Meade asked the Lighthouse Board to provide Carysfort Reef with a revolving light, as the Cape Florida Light, the closest light at 40 miles (64 km) away, was also a fixed light, and he was concerned that ships might confuse the two. A revolving lens apparatus with a first-order Fresnel lens, manufactured by Henry-Leguate of Paris, was installed in the light in 1858.

As of 1982, Carysfort Reef Light had a third-order Fresnel lens.

== Head keepers ==
- Courtland P. Williams (1852 – 1853)
- William Richardson (1853 – 1854)
- Ezra Harris (1854 – 1856)
- Martin McIntyre (1856 – 1858)
- William C. Green (1858 – 1860)
- John Jones (1860 – 1863)
- Charles Bowman (1863 – 1866)
- Charles W. Russell (1866)
- Harry W. Ramsdell (1866 – 1869)
- Edward Bell (1869 – 1881)
- H.W. Magill (1881)
- Fred A. Brost (1881 – 1885)
- Martin Weatherford (1885 – 1886)
- William Lester (1886 – 1894)
- Francis McNulty (1894 – 1903)
- Miguel Fabal (1903 – at least 1912)
- Charles H. Williams (at least 1913)
- Charles Johnson (1915 – ),
- Thomas L. Kelly (1918 – 1919)
- William H. Curry (1919)
- Thomas L. Kelly (1919 – 1922)
- Captain Pierce ( – 1927)
- Alexander B. Jenks (1927 – at least 1936)
- Leonard L. Galloway (1940 – at least 1941)
- Wallace L. Lester (1942 – at least 1948)

== Availability ==
On February 1, 2019 it was announced that the lighthouse would be given away freely to any government agencies, educational agencies, non-profit corporations, or any community development organizations who wanted to use it for "educational, park, recreational, cultural or historic preservation purposes." This is in accordance with the National Historic Lighthouse Preservation Act. If none request it, then it will be auctioned off to anyone else who does.

== See also ==
- List of lighthouses in Florida
- List of lighthouses in the United States

== Sources ==
- Dean, Love (1982). Reef Lights: Seaswept Lighthouses of the Florida Keys. Key West, Florida: The Historic Key West Preservation Board. ISBN 0-943528-03-8..
- McCarthy, Kevin M. (1990). Florida Lighthouses. Gainesville, Florida: University of Florida Press. ISBN 0-8130-0993-6.(pp. 41–44)
- Swanson, Gail (2005). Slave Ship Guerrero. West Conshohocken, Pennsylvania: Infinity Publishing. ISBN 0-7414-2765-6.
- Viele, John (1996). The Florida Keys: A History of the Pioneers. Sarasota, Florida: Pineapple Press. ISBN 1-56164-101-4.
- Viele, John (2001). The Florida Keys: The Wreckers. Sarasota, Florida: Pineapple Press. ISBN 1-56164-219-3.
