= The Thomas Jefferson =

- Supreme Court of the United States

Decided March 18, 1825
- Full case name: The Steam-Boat Thomas Jefferson
- Citations: 23 U.S. 428 (more) 10 Wheat. 428

Holding
- Admiralty jurisdiction did not extend to navigable rivers within the United States.

Court membership
- Chief Justice John Marshall Associate Justices Bushrod Washington · William Johnson; Thomas Todd · Gabriel Duvall; Joseph Story · Smith Thompson

Case opinion
- Majority: Story, joined by unanimous

Laws applied
- Judiciary Act of 1789
- Overruled by
- The Genesee Chief

The Thomas Jefferson, 23 U.S. (10 Wheat.) 428 (1825), was a United States Supreme Court case in which the court held that admiralty jurisdiction did not extend to navigable rivers within the United States. The court strictly construed language in the Judiciary Act of 1789 to conclude that Congress did not intend to change the extent of admiralty jurisdiction. The court upheld this doctrine in The Orleans (1837) but overruled it in The Genesee Chief (1851), saying admiralty jurisdiction had always extended to navigable rivers.
