= Molly (1769 ship) =

British merchant and slave ship 1769–1782

History

Great Britain
- Name: Molly
- Launched: 1769, Liverpool
- Captured: 4 September 1782

General characteristics
- Tons burthen: 240, or 250, or 300 (bm)
- Complement: 20, or 40
- Armament: 14 × 6-pounder guns + 4 × 6-pounder coehorns

Molly was launched in 1769 at Liverpool. In 1776 she made one voyage as a slave ship in the triangular trade in enslaved persons. After, and possibly before, she was a West Indiaman. While sailing under a letter of marque, she captured some notable prizes. Two French frigates captured her on 4 September 1782.

== Career ==
Molly first appeared in an online copy of Lloyd's Register in 1776. There is no readily accessible data on her career before 1776.

| Year | Master | Owner | Trade | Source & notes |
|---|---|---|---|---|
| 1776 | William Ball | Jn Chorley | Liverpool−Africa | LR; damages repaired 1775 |

Captain James Ball sailed from Liverpool on 24 November 1775. Molly acquired slaves at Iles de Los and arrived at Jamaica in 1776 with 300 slaves. She arrived back at Liverpool on 1 November 1776.

After her voyage carrying slaves, Molly, Ball, master, traded between Liverpool and Jamaica.

The British Admiralty gave notice in April 1777, that they were ready to issue letters of marque for privateers against the Americans. In March 1778, Great Britain broke off relations with France.

| Year | Master | Owner | Trade | Source & notes |
|---|---|---|---|---|
| 1778 | W.Ball; Jn Wood | J.Chorley | Liverpool–Jamaica | LR; new wales 1777 |

Captain John Woods acquired a letter of marque on 23 October 1778.

In March 1779 Lloyd's List reported that Molly, Woods, master, Bess, Parry, master, and the privateer Wasp, had captured and taken into Leverpool the schooner Oiseau, which had been on her way from Bordeaux to South Carolina with a cargo of tea, linens, hats, stockings, and silks. She arrived in the Mersey on 25 February. The three also captured the brig St Jacques, from France to America with a cargo of wine, flour, etc., but she had not yet reached Leverpool. Molly had been on her way to Jamaica from Leverpool.

Molly captured the three-decker St Augustine, which had been sailing from Port-au-Prince to Nantes, and sent her into Cork. St Augustine was armed with ten 9-pounder guns, and had a crew of 40 men. She was carrying 536 hogsheads and 15 tierces of Muscovado sugar, 8 hogsheads, 6 tierces, and 95 barrels of indigo, and 300 hides.

== Fate ==
On 4 September 1782 two French frigates bound to Marseilles captured Molly, Woods, master, as Molly was sailing from Leverpool to St Lucia.
