= Saphir (ship) =

French slave ship

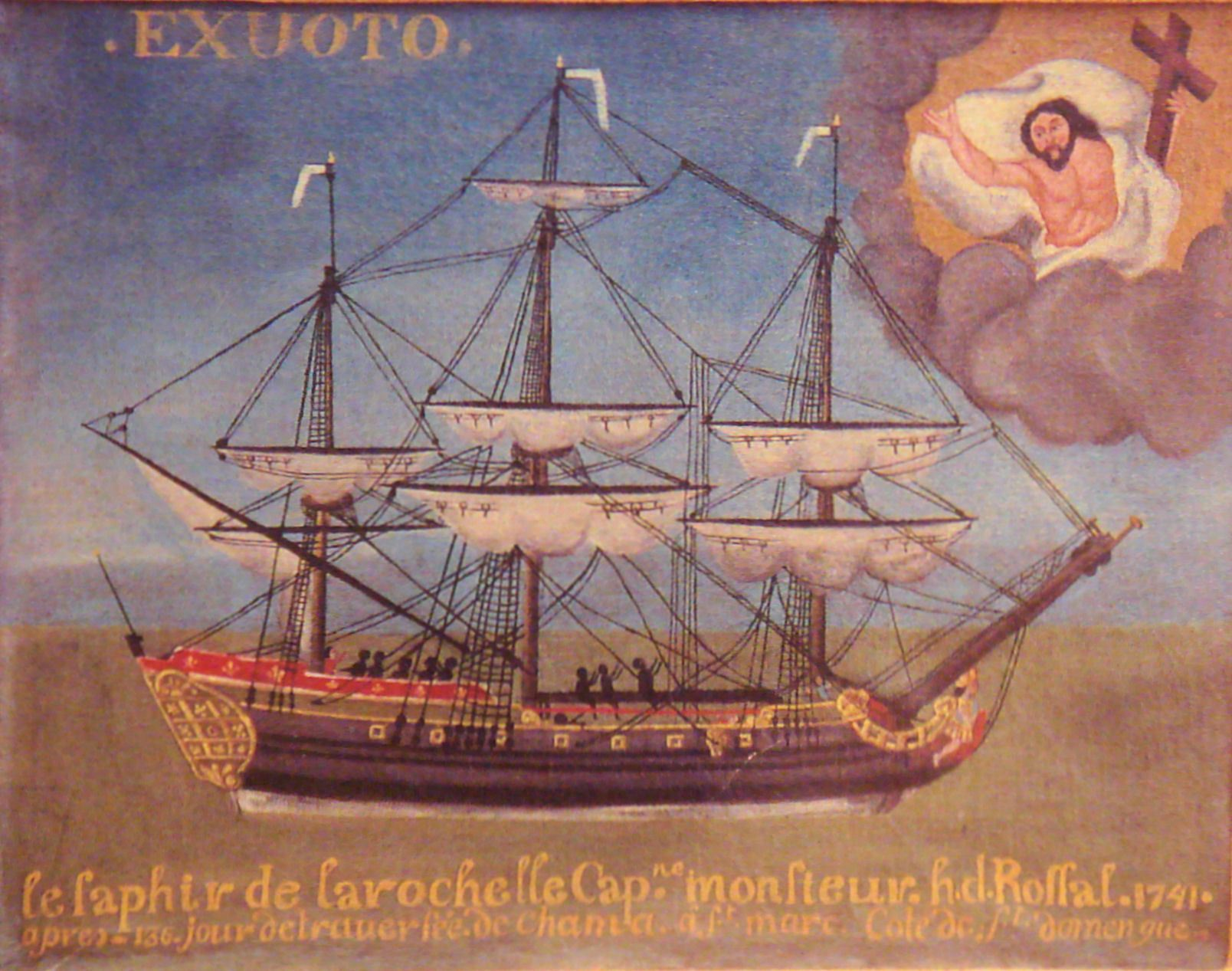
Saphir painted in 1741

Saphir was a French slave ship that operated out of La Rochelle in France.

== Slave voyages ==
Saphir completed two slave voyages. The first in 1737 and the second in 1741. During the second voyage the wind did not blow leaving the crew and enslaved people stranded at sea without sufficient food and water. A revolt by the enslaved people erupted.

== Painting ==
Saphir was painted by an unknown artist in 1741, the painting is located in the Sailors Chapel of Saint Louis Cathedral in La Rochelle, France. It is a protected national object owned by the government of France.

The painting is ex-voto and depicts the ship in control of the enslaved people who are offering gifts to Jesus, shown in the clouds and holding His Cross while raising a hand in blessing.

== Documentary ==
A French documentary film about the ship was released in 2015. The film is called Sapphire of St. Louis and was directed by José Luis Guerín.
