= Beeckestijn (ship) =

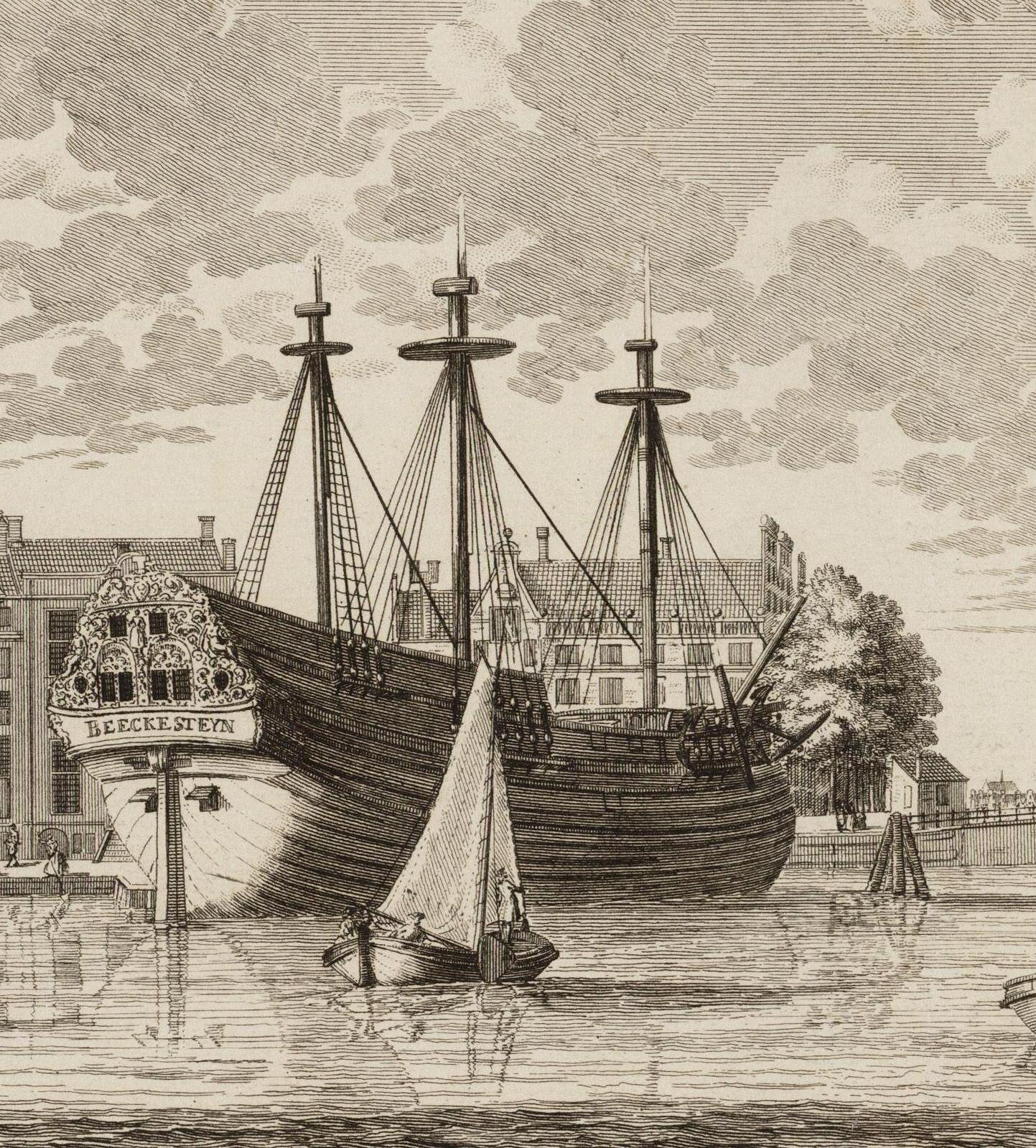
1735 engraving of Beeckestijn docked in Amsterdam

Beeckestijn was a slave ship of the Dutch West India Company. Operating out of Amsterdam, she was depicted in front of the Dutch West India Company warehouses on the Prins Hendrikkade quay by the engraver Hendrik de Leth.

== History ==
The Beeckestijn (Note: Beeckestijn is a country estate near IJmuiden, at that time owned by Jan Trip (1664-1732), mayor of Amsterdam and one of the managers of the VOC and Society of Surinam. His son Jan Trip de Jonge (1691-1721) was the secretary of one of the ten managers of the WIC and may have given this ship its name.) was owned by the Dutch West India Company. (As the WIC gave up her monopoly on slave trade in 1730, but kept the Elmina Castle to provide slave traders, a partly privately owned ship is possible.) She made seven voyages transporting slaves from the African west coast to Suriname in South America and St Eustatius in the Caribbean between 1722 and 1736. Forty-six hundred enslaved Africans were transported, of whom at least 1,000 died during the journey; on some voyages the mortality rate was as high as a third.

Beeckestijn’s maiden voyage, under captain Dirk de Wolf, was out of the Dutch port of Texel on 19 February 1721, she had a crew 63, and was mounted with 26 guns.

The engraving of the Beeckestijn depicted above—the only known 18th-century print of a Dutch West India Company ship—was well known, but it was only with the fortuitous discovery of documents by historian Mark Ponte that the ship was linked to the slave trade.

Slavery was finally abolished in Surinam in 1873.

== Exhibition ==
Mark Ponte is the guest curator of the Amsterdammers en Slavernij exhibition at the Amsterdam City Archives (Amsterdamse Stadsarchief) over the summer of 2020. There are no other known contemporary drawings of Dutch slave ships.

== See also ==
- Dutch Slave Coast
