= Caesar's Rock =

Small island north of the upper Florida Keys in Biscayne National Park

- Caesar's Rock Caesar's Rock (North Atlantic)

Geography
- Location: Atlantic Ocean
- Coordinates: 25.393748°N 80.23206°W

Administration
- United States
- State: Florida
- County: Miami-Dade

Caesar's Rock is a small island north of the upper Florida Keys in Biscayne National Park. It is in Miami-Dade County, Florida.

It is located in southern Biscayne Bay, just north of Old Rhodes Key and Totten Key, just southeast off the southern tip of Elliott Key, and due south of Adams Key. It is in the middle of Caesar Creek, the creek that separates Elliott and Old Rhodes Keys.

== History ==
The island is named after Black Caesar, a pirate. Munroe, writing in "The Commodore's Story" (1930) states: "Caesar's Rock a small island about the middle of the creek, was reputed to be the dwelling place and ship yard of the pirate (Black Caesar)." This is apparently the small key due north of Meig's Key. It is unnamed on current charts.
