= Hare (slave ship) =

New England Slave ship

Hare was a Rhode Island slave ship.

== Slave voyage ==
Hare was owned by Samuel and William Vernon and traded out of Newport, Rhode Island, the slave trading centre of New England, at this time still a British colony. Before a slave voyage beginning in 1754 the Vernons wrote to Thomlinson, Trecothick and Company, in London, taking out insurance.

Hare completed a slave voyage in 1754-1755, taking captives from Sierra Leone and embarking them from South Carolina. The captain was Caleb Godfrey, aged forty-eight, born in Newport in 1706. The Vernons gave Godfrey leave to purchases enslaved people from whichever part of Africa he thought best.

Godfrey purchased most of Hares captives from twenty-four small private traders, travelling south from the Îles de Los towards Sherbro River in the last four months of 1754.

== Sale of enslaved people ==
Henry Laurens purchased nine captives from Hare, more than any other single purchaser. Fourteen Hare captives were bought by people who lived in or near Charles Town. Of those, nine were women, four were men, and one was a child. Three women were purchased by William Lloyd, who lived on Wando Neck.

Around three-quarters of the Hare captives lived on rural plantations, mostly producing rice and indigo.

== Construction ==
Hare was a sloop, with a double plank bottom to prevent infestation of worms and parasites, with a burthen of around sixty tons.

== Sources ==
- Kelley, Sean (2019). The Voyage of the Slave Ship Hare: A Journey into Captivity from Sierra Leone to South Carolina. The University of North Carolina Press.
