= Duc du Maine (slave ship) =

Slave ship

History

France
- Name: Duc du Maine
- Owner: Compagnie des Indes
- Builder: Saint-Malo, France
- Launched: 1707

General characteristics
- Class & type: Fregat
- Tons burthen: 320, or 365 (bm)
- Length: 101.71 ft (31.00 m)
- Beam: 29.86 ft (9.10 m)
- Complement: 71
- Armament: 20 guns mounted

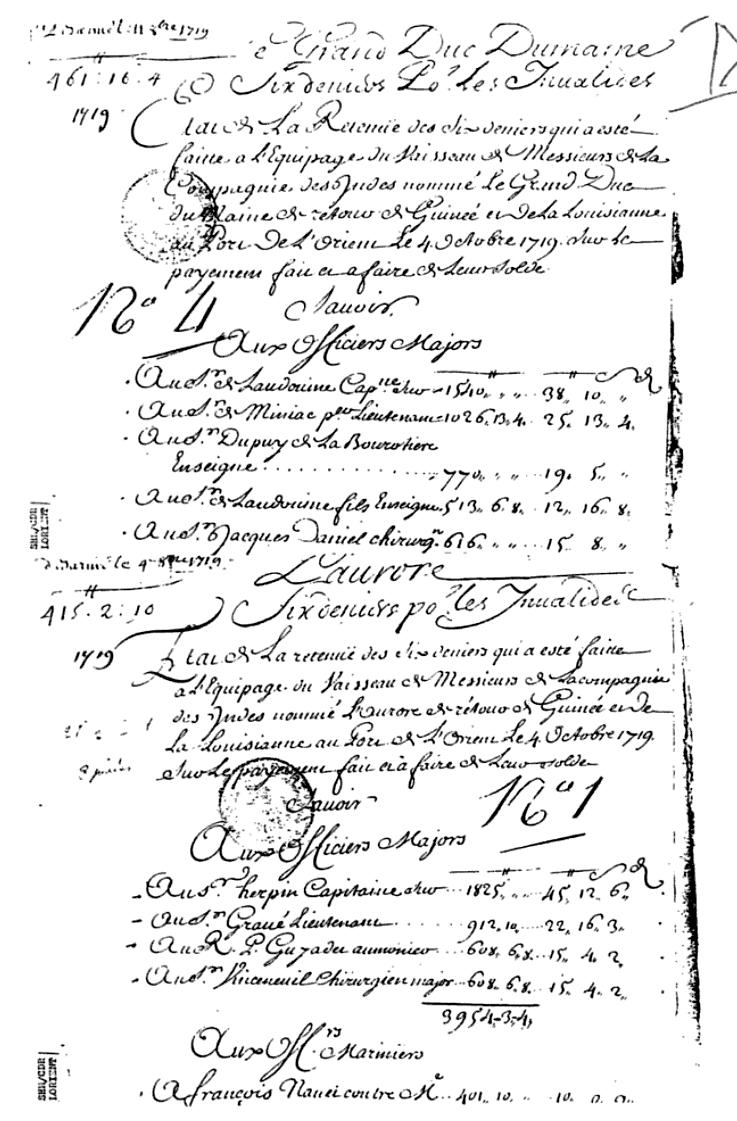
Fiche de Desarmement of the first two African slave-trade ships to Louisiana, dated October 4, 1719

Duc du Maine (along with the Aurore) was a slave ship that on June 6, 1719, brought the first African slaves to Louisiana. She had carried them from Senegambia.

== Voyages ==
The ship could carry 500 to 600 slaves. Several voyages have been documented in the Trans Atlantic Slave Database.

=== First voyage ===
The first documented slave voyage (Voyage 32884) was in 1719 under Capt. de Lauduoine. began at Port Louis, France. Slaves were purchased at Whydah, and landed at Biloxi. Other sources state that after three months at sea, the first landing occurred at Dauphin Island with 250 slaves. The voyage ended in Lorient, France.

=== Second voyage ===
The second voyage, (Voyage 32851), under Capt. N. Roseau with 349 slaves, arrived in March 1721. The voyage also began in France, but the slaves were purchased in the Bight of Benin, and disembarked on the Gulf Coast.

=== Third voyage ===
The third voyage (Voyage 33116) under Capt. A. de Lavigne carried slaves from West Central Africa and St. Helena to Martinique, arriving Jan. 14, 1727. Of 491 slaves, 431 were alive to disembark at Martinique; 42 out of 91 crew members died en route.

== See also ==
- Aurore (slave ship)
