= The Antelope =

- Supreme Court of the United States

Decided March 15, 1825
- Full case name: The Antelope
- Citations: 23 U.S. 66 (more) 10 Wheat. 66; 6 L. Ed. 268

Holding
- Approximately 120 slaves were repatriated to the American Colonization Society colony in what is now Liberia. Approximately 30 slaves were ruled to be the property of the Spanish claimants and went to slavery in Florida.

Court membership
- Chief Justice John Marshall Associate Justices Bushrod Washington · William Johnson; Thomas Todd · Gabriel Duvall; Joseph Story · Smith Thompson

Case opinion
- Majority: Marshall, joined by unanimous

The Antelope, 23 U.S. (10 Wheat.) 66 (1825), was a case in which the Supreme Court of the United States considered, for the first time, the legitimacy of the international slave trade, and determined "that possession on board of a vessel was evidence of property".

== Background ==
The importation of slaves into the United States became illegal in 1808, under the Act Prohibiting Importation of Slaves. That act did not include any effective penalties for violation, and did not specify what was to be done with illegally imported slaves. In practice, each state auctioned off such slaves and kept the proceeds. In 1819 the Act in Addition to the acts prohibiting the slave trade gave the President authority to use U.S. Navy and other armed ships to capture slave ships, and to see to the "safe-keeping, support and removal beyond the United States" of any Africans found on captured slave ships. In 1820 the capture of "negroes or mulattoes" for the purpose of enslaving them, and the importation of slaves into the United States, was defined as "piracy" by an amendment to the Act to Protect the Commerce of the United States and Punish the Crime of Piracy.

== Capture and claims ==
On June 29, 1820, the United States Revenue-Marine cutter Dallas captured the slave ship Antelope, carrying some 280 Africans, off the coast of Florida (which was still Spanish at the time) on suspicion that it intended to illegally import slaves into the United States. The ship had been built in the U.S. and named Antelope. It was later sold to a Spanish owner, renamed Fenix, and licensed by the Spanish government to carry slaves from Africa to Cuba. The Antelope had been captured by a privateer at Cabinda, renamed General Ramirez, and used to transport slaves already on board, as well as slaves taken from other ships flying the Portuguese flag, and from an American ship. The Antelope, its crew, and the Africans aboard were taken to Savannah, Georgia.

Captain John Jackson of the Dallas filed a claim (called a "libel" in admiralty law) in federal court in admiralty in Savannah to be paid either $25 (~$526.00 in 2025) a head for the Africans on the Antelope under the provisions of the 1819 Act in Addition to the acts prohibiting the slave trade, if they were free, or the salvage value as property lost at sea, if they were slaves of Spanish and Portuguese owners. In early August, libels were filed in federal court in admiralty that 150 or more of the Africans aboard the Antelope belonged to the King of Spain, and that 130 belonged to the King of Portugal. Later in August Richard W. Habersham, the United States District Attorney for Georgia, filed a libel in court that under the Act in Addition, the Africans on the Antelope were free, on the grounds that they had been removed from Africa by persons intending to sell them in the United States.

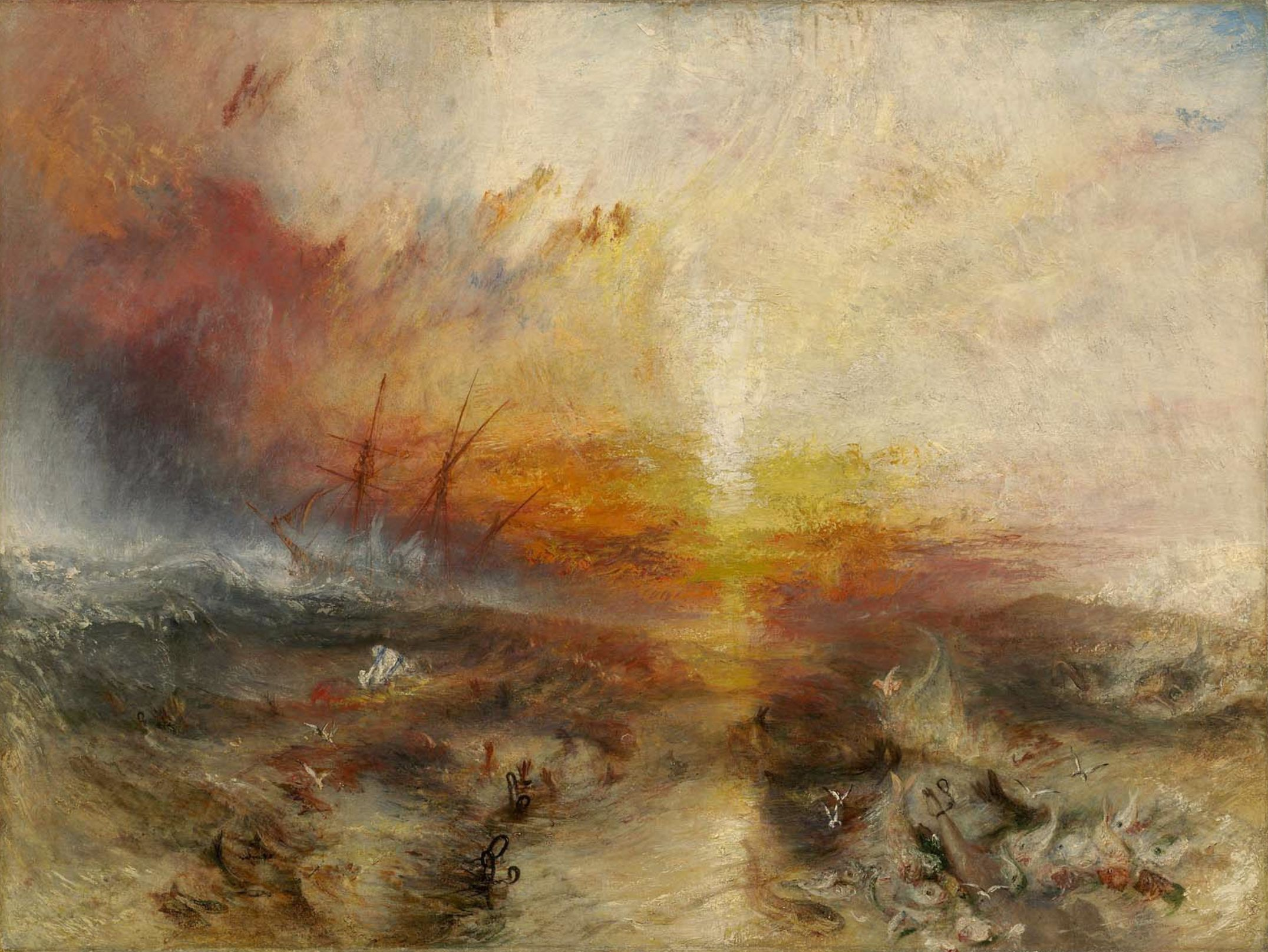
The Slave Ship, an 1840 painting by J. M. W. Turner

== Trial for piracy ==
John Smith was first mate on the Columbia, later renamed Arraganta, when it sailed from Baltimore, Maryland under a letter of marque issued by the Uruguayan revolutionary José Gervasio Artigas. (American law prohibited U.S. citizens from serving on foreign war ships, and all of the crew on the Columbia had sworn that they were not U.S. citizens.) After the Arraganta captured the Antelope, John Smith became captain of the prize crew on the Antelope, which was renamed General Ramirez.

Smith was put on trial for piracy in December 1820 on three charges, that he had stolen $25 (~$576.00 in 2025) worth of goods from a French schooner attacked by the Arraganta, and that he had participated in the capture of a Portuguese ship and of the Antelope. In 1820 the capture of "negroes or mulattoes" for the purpose of enslaving them, and the importation of slaves into the United States, had been defined as "piracy" by an amendment to the Act to Protect the Commerce of the United States and Punish the Crime of Piracy, but Smith was not charged under that provision. His initial defense was that he was an officer of the Banda Oriental. Evidence was found, however, that he was a citizen of the U.S., and it was thus illegal for him to serve in the military or on a privateer of a foreign country. His lawyer then argued that Smith had renounced his citizenship and become a citizen of the Banda Oriental, that he had relied on the validity of the letter of marque, that he had argued against the capture of the French ship, and that Spanish and Portuguese ships were legitimate targets under the letter of marque. The judge instructed the jurors that Smith had shown no piratical intent, and Smith was acquitted of all charges. After he was acquitted of piracy, Smith filed a libel for the return of the Antelope and its cargo as a legitimate prize.

== Trial in admiralty ==
Trial in federal court in admiralty to consider the various libels against the Antelope began in January 1821. The number of Africans on the Antelope that had been taken from various ships (and therefore, their potential owners) was in contention. Three members of the Spanish crew, who had been put ashore when the Arraganta captured the Antelope, were then in Savannah. They testified that there were 166 Africans aboard the Antelope when it was captured. John Smith testified that there were only 93 Africans on the Antelope when it was captured, and that 210 Africans were taken from Portuguese ships. Smith and another member of the prize crew testified that 25 Africans had been taken from the American brig Essex, and that approximately half of those had died or drowned en route.

== Result ==
The Supreme Court dismissed the claim by John Smith for return of the Antelope as a prize of war. It calculated that the privateer had taken 93 Africans on the Antelope and 183 from the ships flying the Portuguese flag, noting a lack of proof of the actual nationality of those ships.

One hundred twenty survivors of the Africans found on the Antelope were sent to Liberia in July 1827. The people from the Antelope were settled in a new colony, called New Georgia after their home of the prior seven years. Approximately 30 slaves were ruled to be the property of the Spanish claimants and went to slavery in Florida; since no one could determine which ship a given slave came from, the 30 were randomly selected.

== See also ==
- United States v. The Amistad, 1841 case
