= Black Caesar (pirate) =

18th-century black pirate

Caesar, later known as "Black Caesar" (fl. 1718), was a West African pirate who operated during the Golden Age of Piracy. He served aboard the Queen Anne's Revenge of Edward Teach (Blackbeard) and was one of the surviving members of that crew following Blackbeard's death at the hands of Lieutenant Robert Maynard in 1718. Myths surrounding his life - that he was African royalty and terrorized the Florida Keys for years before joining Blackbeard - have been intermixed with legends and fictional accounts as well as with other pirates.

== The legend ==
Black Caesar, according to traditional accounts, was a prominent African tribal war chieftain. Widely known for his "huge size, immense strength and keen intelligence", he evaded capture from many different slave traders. Caesar was finally captured when he and twenty of his warriors were lured onto a ship by a slave trader. Showing him a watch, the trader promised to show him and his warriors more objects, which were "too heavy and too numerous to bring on shore" if they came aboard his ship. He enticed them to stay with food, musical instruments, silk scarves and jewels, however, he had his men raise anchor and slowly sail away. When Caesar discovered what was happening, he and his men attempted to charge their captors but were driven back by the well-armed sailors using swords and pistols. Although it took a considerable length of time for him and his warriors to accept their captivity, he was eventually befriended by a sailor who was the only man Black Caesar would accept food and water from.

As they neared the coast of Florida, the sudden appearance of a hurricane threatened to destroy the ship on the Florida Reefs. Recognizing the ship's imminent destruction, the sailor snuck below decks and freed Caesar. The two then forced the captain and crew into a corner, most likely at gunpoint, and boarded one of the longboats with ammunition and other supplies. The wind and waves pushed them to shore where they waited out the storm, apparently the only survivors of the doomed ship.

They soon began using the lifeboat to lure passing ships which stopped to give assistance. While posing as shipwrecked sailors, they would sail out to the vessel offering to take them aboard. Once they were close to the vessel, they brought out their guns and demanded supplies and ammunition, threatening to sink the ship if they were refused. He and the sailor continued this ploy for a number of years and amassed a sizable amount of treasure which was buried on Elliott Key. However, he and the sailor had a falling out over a young woman the mate had brought back from one of the ships they had looted. Fighting over her, Caesar killed his longtime friend in a duel and took the woman for his own.

He began taking on more pirates over time and soon was able to attack ships on the open sea. He and his crew were often able to avoid capture by running into Caesar Creek and other inlets between Elliot and Old Rhodes Key and onto the mangrove islands. Using a metal ring embedded in a rock, they ran a strong rope through the ring, heeled the boat over, and hid their boat in the water until the patrol ship or some other danger went away. They might also lower the mast and sink the ship in shallow water, later cutting the rope or pumping out the water to raise the boat and continue raiding. It is thought that he and his men buried 26 bars of silver on the island, although no treasure has ever been recovered from the island.

He reputedly had a harem on his island, having at least 100 women seized from passing ships, as well as a prison camp where he kept prisoners in stone huts hoping to ransom them. When leaving the island to go on raids, he left no provisions for these prisoners and many eventually starved to death. A few children reportedly escaped captivity, subsisting on berries and shellfish, and formed their own language and customs. This society of lost children gave rise to native superstition that the island is haunted.

Caesar's Rock, one of three islands located north of Key Largo, is reportedly named after him, as is a channel there called Caesar's Creek.

The myths surrounding Black Caesar's time in the Florida Keys cannot be verified by period sources. Elements of the legends surrounding Black Caesar can be traced to literary inventions such as the 1798 play Blackbeard, or The Captive Princess and the 1922 novel Black Caesar's Clan.

== Service with Blackbeard ==
What can be known for certain is that Caesar served aboard Blackbeard's flagship Queen Anne's Revenge. He was still with Blackbeard in 1718 when the pirates were cornered by Lieutenant Maynard. A General History of the Pyrates (1724) records that:

Teach had little or no Hopes of escaping, and therefore had posted a resolute Fellow, a Negroe whom he had bred up, with a lighted Match, in the Powder-Room, with Commands to blow up when he should give him Orders, which was as soon as the Lieutenant and his Men could have entered, that so he might have destroy'd his Conquerors: and when the Negro found how it went with Black-beard, he could hardly be perswaded from the rash Action, by two Prisoners that were then in the Hold of the Sloop.”

Taken prisoner by Virginian colonial authorities, Caesar (whom the General History refers to only as Caesar, not as Black Caesar) was tried for piracy but was acquitted. Later historians and writers equated the "Negroe" who tried to blow up the vessel with Caesar but there were at least six black pirates aboard the ship and the one "bred up" by Blackbeard was not identified at trial. Despite his acquittal Caesar is often described as having been convicted and hanged. After his release the ex-slave Caesar may have returned to the possession of Chief Justice and Secretary of the province of Carolina, Tobias Knight, or to that of Virginia Governor Alexander Spotswood. Caesar may also have survived piracy and slavery to work as a cooper past age 70.

== In popular culture ==
The "Black Caesar" character appeared in the 2005 mini series Blackbeard: Terror at Sea, the 2006 miniseries Blackbeard, an episode of Legends of Tomorrow titled "The Great British Fake-Off", and the 2021 Netflix documentary series The Lost Pirate Kingdom.

The 2011 film Pirates of the Caribbean: On Stranger Tides featured Blackbeard with zombie crewmen, and one of them was intended to be based on Black Caesar by concept artist Miles Teves, but ultimately wasn't incorporated into the movie.

Vengeance Unchained: The Legend of Black Caesar, a five-issue comic series by Shaquille O’Neal, Stephanie Williams, and Ray-Anthony Height and published by Archie Comics was announced in June 2026, with the first issue scheduled to release in October 2026.

== See also ==
- Maroon (people)
