= Aurore (slave ship) =

French slave ship

History

France
- Name: L'Aurore
- Owner: Delacour Vieux, Compagnie d'Occident

General characteristics
- Class & type: Fregat
- Tons burthen: 305 (bm)

Aurore was a French slave ship which along with the Duc du Maine brought the first African slaves to Louisiana on 6 June 1719, from Senegambia. The ship could carry approximately 600 slaves.

== Voyage ==
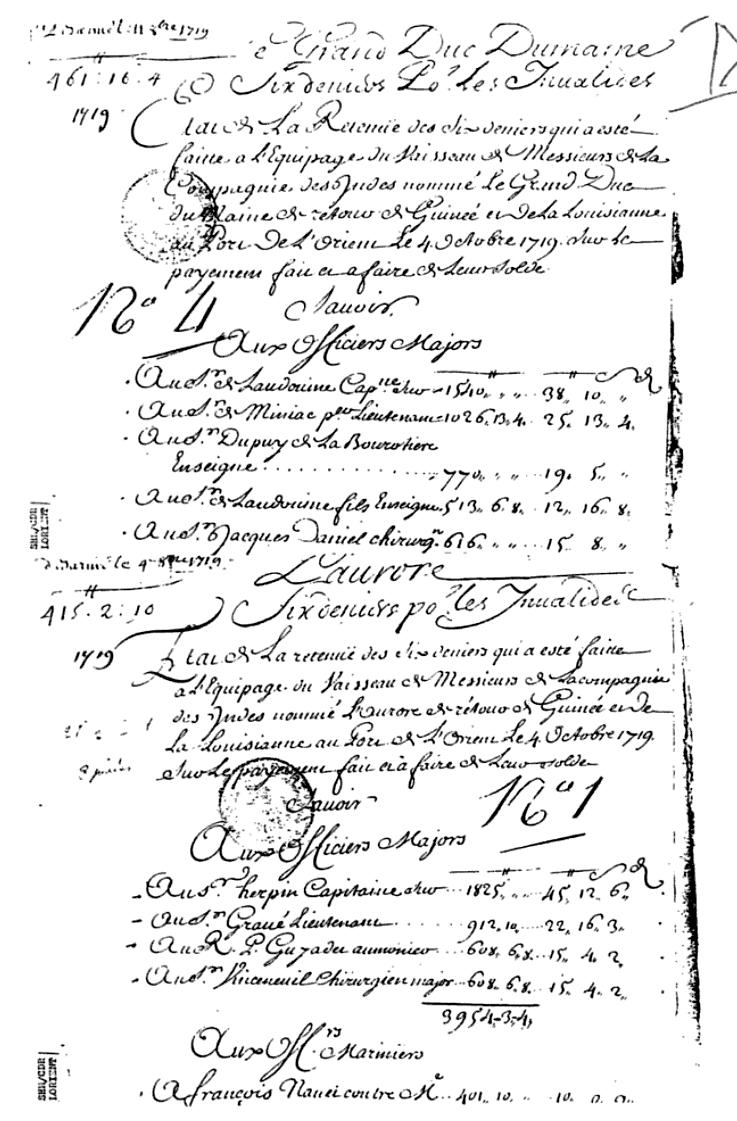
Fiche de Desarmement of the first two African slave trade ships to Louisiana, dated October 4, 1719

Captain Herpin sailed Aurore from Saint-Malo in July 1718, bound for the Bight of Benin. She arrived off the coast of Africa on 28 August. Herpin first gathered slaves at Whydah (Ouidah) and then at Cape Lahou. He sailed from Africa on 30 November, and arrived at Louisiana on 6 June 1719. Herpin had embarked 201 slaves and despite the length of the voyage, disembarked 200 slaves. By contrast, 11 crew members died on the journey. Aurore arrived back in France, at Lorient, on 4 October.

== Information ==
Sketches from a later Aurore illustrate some aspects of the practices of the slave trade. The slaves on ships such as Aurore (1719), were packed in a tight spoon-like position in order to be able to carry as many slaves as possible. The slaves wore leg shackles to reduce the risk of an uprising.

== See also ==
- Duc du Maine (slave ship)
