= Antelope (1802 slave ship) =

Slave ship

History
- Name: Antelope
- Builder: Freeport, Maine
- Completed: 1802

General characteristics
- Tons burthen: 112 (bm)

Antelope was a slave ship that the United States captured in 1820 with more than 280 captive Africans aboard. It had been legally engaged in the African slave trade under the flag of Spain when it was taken over by a privateer at Cabinda. The legal case on the fate of the captured Africans, known as The Antelope, lasted for seven years, with some of the Africans being turned over as slaves to Spanish owners, while 120 were sent as free people to Liberia.

== End of slave trade ==
The importation of slaves into the United States became illegal in 1808, under the Act Prohibiting Importation of Slaves. That act did not include any effective penalties for violation, and did not specify what was to be done with illegally imported slaves. In practice, each state auctioned off such slaves and kept the proceeds. In 1819 the Act in Addition to the acts prohibiting the slave trade gave the President authority to use U.S. Navy and other armed ships to capture slave ships, and to see to the "safe-keeping, support and removal beyond the United States" of any Africans found on captured slave ships.

== The ships ==
Antelope was a ship of a little more than 112 tons burthen built in Freeport, Maine, in 1802. In 1809 she was sold to a foreign owner, and in 1819 she passed to a Spanish owner in Cádiz, who renamed her Fenix. The new owner of Antelope was licensed in August 1819 by the Spanish government of Cuba to trade for new slaves from Africa. In early March 1820 Antelope was at Cabinda loading African slaves when a privateer flying the flag of an unspecified Latin American republic (several of which were then rebelling against Spanish rule) accosted Antelope and seized goods and supplies and the best of the slaves from the ship. After the privateer left, Antelope resumed loading slaves.

A hermaphrodite brig of a little less than 200 tons burthen named Baltimore, under the flag of the Venezuelan revolutionary Luis Brión, arrived in Baltimore in 1819. In December 1819 the ship, now named Columbia, sailed from Baltimore under a letter of marque issued by the Uruguayan revolutionary José Gervasio Artigas. The crew of Columbia had all sworn that they were not citizens of the United States, but a United States Revenue-Marine cutter removed four of the crewmen as U.S. citizens before escorting the ship out to sea. Once at sea the ship's name was changed to Arraganta.

Arraganta boarded or chased American, British and Spanish ships on the way to Africa. In early 1820 Arraganta encountered the American registered brig Exchange, out of Bristol, Rhode Island, and seized at least 25 Africans that it was carrying. On March 23, 1820, Arraganta arrived at Cabinda, where it found Antelope and three ships flying the Portuguese flag, all loading African slaves. The crew of Arraganta captured the four ships, and loaded the Africans from the Portuguese ships onto Arraganta and Antelope.

Antelope was renamed General Ramirez, and together with Arraganta sailed to Brazil, where Arraganta wrecked on the coast. Some of the crew and captive Africans on Arraganta were drowned or captured. The rest of the survivors were taken aboard Antelope, which sailed to Dutch Surinam, where the crew of Antelope tried unsuccessfully to sell the Africans, and then to Swedish St. Bartholomew, where the unarmed Antelope obtained cannon and supplies. Antelope then sailed to Florida (which was still Spanish at the time), loitering near St. Augustine while flying the American flag. Word of a suspicious ship reached St. Marys, Georgia, and the revenue cutter Dallas sailed in search of it. Dallas found Antelope sailing north near Amelia Island on June 29, 1820, and stopped it.

The first mate of Dallas counted 281 living Africans, and two bodies, on Antelope. Noting that the crew were all English-speaking, and not satisfied with the explanations offered for the presence of Antelope in the area, Dallas arrested the captain and crew, and took the ship and its cargo to St. Marys. Crew, ship, and the Africans aboard it were subsequently moved to Savannah, Georgia. Richard W. Habersham, the United States District Attorney for Georgia, reported on July 19 that there were "about 270" Africans (nine of the Africans had died before reaching Savannah). The Africans were placed in the custody of John Morel, United States Marshall for the District of Georgia. Morel reported in early August that he had received 258 Africans. No explanation for the discrepancy was offered. Marshall Morel confined the Africans in an open area at the Savannah race course, which became known as the "African encampment".

== Aftermath ==
John Smith, former first mate of Arraganta and captain of Antelope after she was captured by the privateer, was prosecuted for piracy, but acquitted. He then filed a claim for the return of Antelope and her cargo as a legitimate prize taken by a licensed privateer. Claims for ownership of the Africans were filed on behalf of the Kings of Portugal and Spain, while Richard Habersham filed a claim to place the Africans into the custody of the United States as free persons under the provisions of the 1819 "Act in addition to Acts prohibiting the slave trade".

The case eventually reached the United States Supreme Court in 1825. Francis Scott Key had urged it to take the case and argued on behalf of the United States government that all the captives should be freed and returned to Africa. The justices partly agreed with Key and Attorney General William Wirt and rejected the claims of John Smith and the King of Portugal. However, four justices were also slaveowners and awarded some of the Africans as slaves to Spanish owners. Chief Justice John Marshall remarked that the international slave trade, while against the law of nature, was not piracy nor contrary to international law of the day. The highest American court ultimately found ownership had only been established for 93 captives, and so directed that 120 be returned to Africa. The 120 freed Africans were sent to Liberia in July 1827, where they founded the colony of New Georgia.
