= Carysfort Reef =

Coral reef in the Florida Keys, US

- Location within Florida Location within the Caribbean

Location
- Location: Caribbean
- Coordinates: 25°13′03″N 80°12′53″W
- Country: United States

Geology
- Type: reef

Carysfort is a coral reef located within the Florida Keys National Marine Sanctuary. It lies to the east of Key Largo, within the Key Largo Existing Management Area, which is immediately to the east of John Pennekamp Coral Reef State Park. This reef is within a Sanctuary Preservation Area (SPA). The reef is northeast of The Elbow. The Carysfort Reef Light is near the center of the SPA.

The reef is named after HMS Carysfort, which ran aground there (but did not sink) in 1770. Several charts and other publications of the late 18th and early 19th centuries spelled the name of the reef as "Carysford", with some sources giving the ship's name as Carysford, but "Carysfort" was standard for the reef by the middle of the 19th century.

The reef is one of the most dangerous on the Florida Reef tract which parallels the Florida Keys. Of the 324 ships that were known to have wrecked on the Florida Reef from the beginning of 1833 through 1841, 63 did so on Carysfort Reef. The United States Lighthouse Board reported in the 1850s that "Carysfort Reef picks up twenty percent of all the wrecks between Cape Florida and the Tortugas, a space of 200 miles (320 km)." A well-known early wreck, discovered in 1939, is that of HMS Winchester, which was driven onto the reef in 1695 by a hurricane. Only eight of the 350 crew aboard survived the wreck.

After the United States acquired Florida from Spain in 1821, it began building lighthouses along the Florida coast. A survey of the Florida Keys in 1823 identified the need for a navigational light at Carysfort Reef, but construction of a lighthouse on the exposed reef was considered impractical, and the surveyors recommended that a lightship be stationed there. The Caesar served as a lightship at Carysfort Reef from 1826 until 1830, and was replaced by the Florida, which was stationed at the reef from 1831 to 1852, when a lighthouse was finally built on the reef.

== Gallery ==
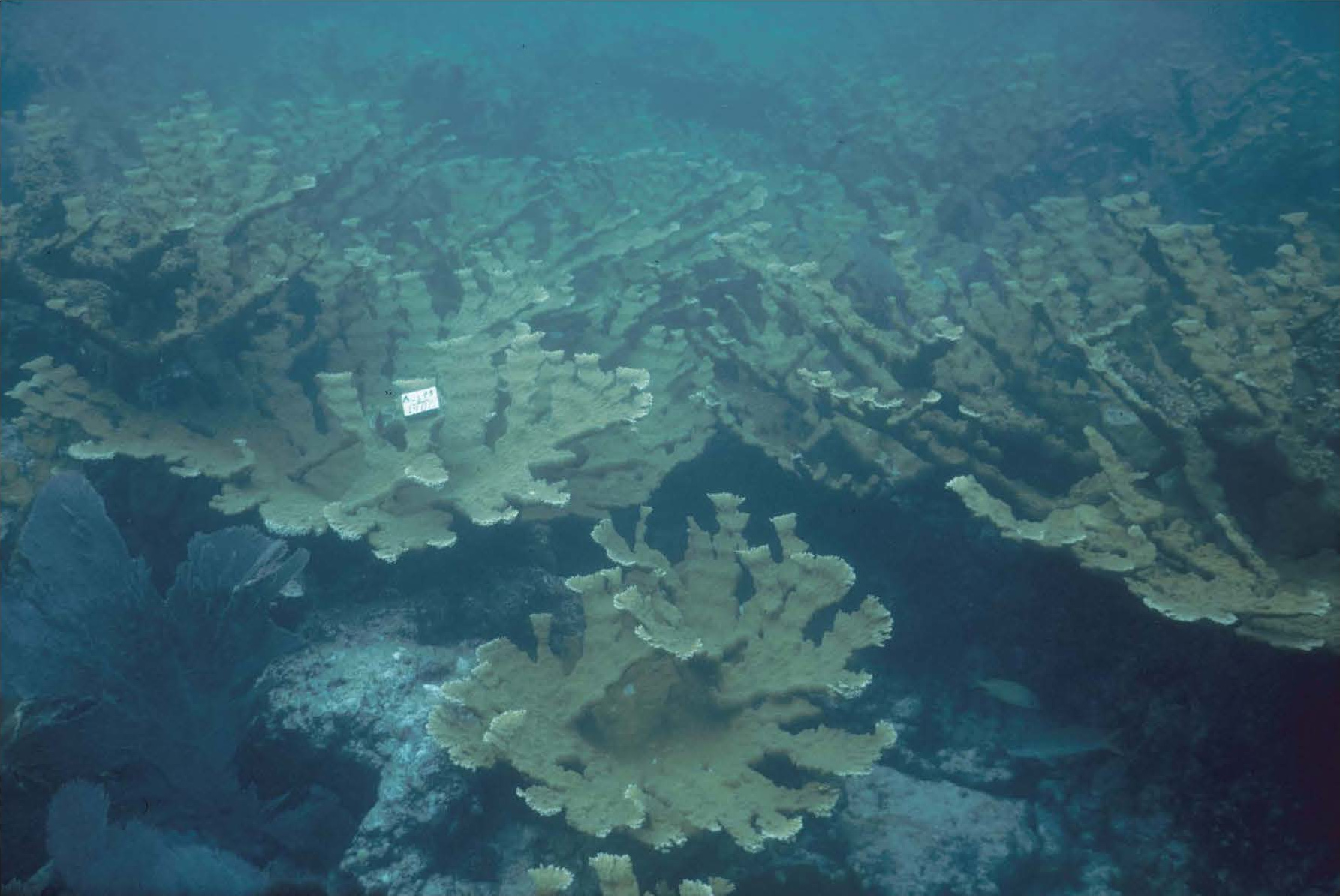
Acropora palmata at Carysfort Reef prior to the 1970s. Photo by Phil Dustan.

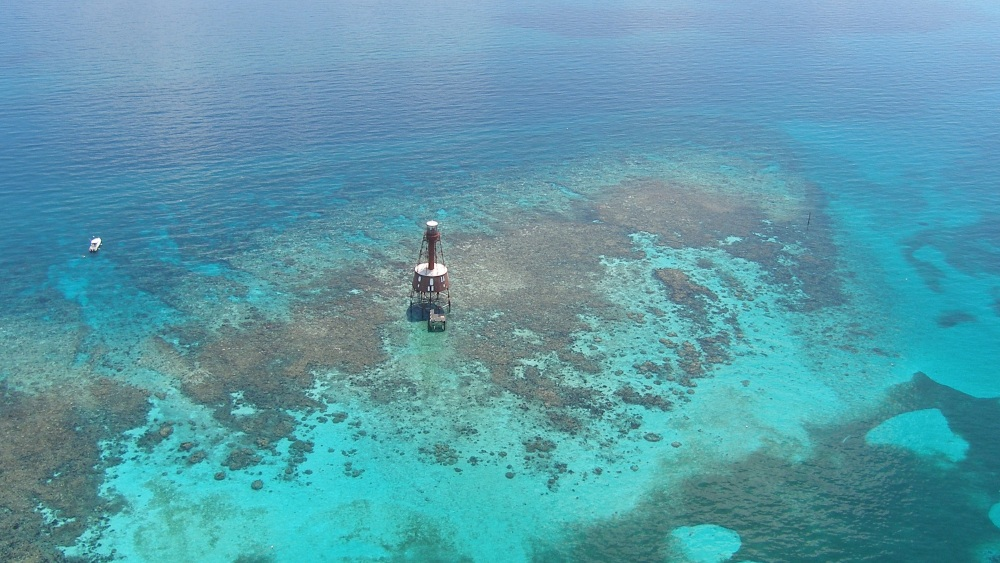
Carysfort reef and Lighthouse in 2024

== Sources ==
- Dean, Love (1982). Reef Lights: Seaswept Lighthouses of the Florida Keys. Key West, Florida: The Historic Key West Preservation Board. ISBN 0-943528-03-8..
- McCarthy, Kevin M. (1990). Florida Lighthouses. Gainesville, Florida: University of Florida Press. ISBN 0-8130-0993-6.(pp. 41–44)
- Viele, John (1996). The Florida Keys: A History of the Pioneers. Sarasota, Florida: Pineapple Press. ISBN 1-56164-101-4.
