= HMS Nimble (1826) =

British warship wrecked in the Bahamas in 1834

History

Gran Colombia
- Name: Bolivar
- Launched: 1822
- Fate: Purchased by Royal Navy

United Kingdom
- Acquired: 1826
- Renamed: Nimble
- Fate: Wrecked 4 November 1834

General characteristics
- Tons burthen: 168 (bm)
- Length: 83 ft 7 in (25.5 m) (gundeck); 64 ft 7 1/2 in (19.7 m) (keel)
- Beam: 22 ft 2 in (6.8 m)
- Depth of hold: 9 ft 5 in (2.9 m)
- Sail plan: Schooner
- Complement: 35–41
- Armament: 4 × 18-pounder carronades; 1 × 18-pounder gun

HMS Nimble (Note: The Parliamentary Papers names the vessel as both "His Majesty's Schooner Nimble" and "His Britannic Majesty's schooner Nimble." Parliamentary papers 1835:75.) was a Royal Navy 5-gun schooner-of-war. She was employed in anti-slave trade patrol from 1826 until 1834, when she was wrecked on a reef with the loss of 70 Africans who had been rescued from a slave ship.

== Background ==
In 1818, the United Kingdom and Spain entered into a treaty forbidding the importation of slaves into Spanish territories. One provision of the treaty set up a Mixed Commission Court in Havana to deal with Spanish ships caught by the Royal Navy while trying to carry Africans to slavery in Cuba. A similar British-Portuguese court in Sierra Leone ruled on Portuguese slave ships caught by the Royal Navy. The Nimble was assigned to the squadron that the Royal Navy maintained on the approaches to Cuba to enforce the provisions of the treaty. Slave ships captured near Africa and their cargoes of Africans were taken to Sierra Leone for disposition. Spanish slave ships captured near Cuba were taken to Havana to be dealt with by the Mixed Commission Court, while Portuguese ships caught in Caribbean or North American waters had to be taken to Sierra Leone. Despite the efforts of the Royal Navy, large numbers of Africans continued to be carried to slavery in Cuba, in part because Spanish officials in Cuba were often complicit in the illegal slave trade. More than 64,000 Africans may have been illegally landed in Cuba between 1822 and 1829.

== Construction ==
She was built in 1822 as the Gran Colombian schooner Bolivar or General Bolivar. She may have been used as a slave ship at some point in her career. The Magpie-class schooner Nimble (built by McLean of Jamaica) was rejected as unsatisfactory in 1826, and, in August 1826 the Royal Navy purchased Bolivar, renamed her Nimble, and assigned her to the Royal Navy's West Indies Squadron. In Royal Navy service, Nimble carried four 18-pounder (8.2-kg) carronades and one 18-pounder cannon. (Note: Swanson 2005, p. 13 states that one source says "eight guns", while another says "two gunades and an 18-pounder on a swivel"; O'Byrne 1849, p. 96 states "5 guns". A letter from Lieutenant Bolton, dated "His Britannic Majesty's schooner Nimble, Havanna, 16 November 1833" states that the slave-schooner Joaquina received "two 8-pound shot between wind and water", so it seems likely that by 1833 Nimble had reduced her armament to 8-pounder long guns.)

== Career ==
From the records of slave ships captured, it is clear that Nimble was engaged in the interception of slavers throughout the years 1827 to 1834.

On 19 December 1827, Nimble ran aground near the Florida Keys while engaged in a gun battle with the Spanish slave ship Guerrero. Guerrero sank and 41 Africans imprisoned in the hold drowned. The crew and 520 surviving Africans were rescued from Guerrero by wreckers. Spanish crew members from Guerrero hijacked two of the wrecking vessels and escaped to Cuba with 398 of the Africans. The remaining 120 Africans were taken to Key West. Nimble had lost her rudder when she went aground, but the wreckers helped Nimble's crew float her off the reef and fit the rudder from Guerrero on her.

Nimble is recorded as salvaging the US vessel La Fayette on 13 May 1829. In June 1829, Nimble assisted HMS Monkey after Monkey had captured the Spanish slave ship Midas near Bimini. Midas had left Africa in April 1829 with 562 Africans. Only 369 were still alive when Midas was captured by Monkey, and 72 more died (of "smallpox, diarrhea & scurvy") before Monkey and Nimble could take Midas to Havana.

Lieutenant Joseph Sherer transferred from Monkey to Nimble. On 16 November 1829, Nimble captured the Spanish slave ship Gallito, carrying 16 crew and 136 Africans, near the Berry Islands, and took her to Havana. Head money for the 136 slaves was paid in 1831. (Note: A first-class share was worth £346 13s 1d; a sixth class share, that of an ordinary seaman, was worth £9 19s 11¼d.) Sherer was promoted to Commander on 29 December for his successes while captain of Monkey.

On 13 July 1832, Nimble captured the Portuguese slave ship Hebe, which was carrying 401 "Angolans". The Africans were in such poor condition that they were deemed unfit for a voyage to Sierra Leone, and were kept in the Bahamas. At first settled on isolated Highburn Cay, many were later recruited into the West India Regiment and the rest were apprenticed to white Bahamians.

In May 1833, Nimble captured the Spanish slave ship La Negrita, carrying 189 Africans. When Nimble tried to take the captured ship to Havana for disposition by the Mixed Commission Court, she was turned away because of a cholera epidemic in Cuba, and the Africans were taken to Trinidad.

On 10 November 1833, Nimble captured the Spanish slave ship Joaquina, carrying 348 Africans, after a battle near the Isle of Pines. The Spanish captain and two captive Africans were killed in the battle (another African died later of his wounds), and Joaquina sank.

A few days later, Nimble drove on shore the Spanish schooner Amistad Habanera on a lightly inhabited part of the Isle of Pines. After they had laded their slaves, Amistad Habanera's crew blew up their schooner.

Reportedly, Nimble's success in combating the slave trade so exasperated the Havana slave traders that they considered outfitting a ship and arming her with 20 guns, with the mission of capturing Nimble.

On 7 December 1833, Nimble captured the Spanish slave ship Manuelita, carrying a crew of 34 and 485 Africans, near the Isle of Pines. In August 1834, Nimble captured a Portuguese slave ship carrying 162 Africans and delivered them to the Bahamas.

While under the command of Lieutenant Bolton from 24 February 1833 until the wreck, Nimble captured six slave vessels with a total of 1,902 Africans aboard.

== Fate ==
In November 1834, Nimble pursued the Spanish slave ship Carlota until Carlotta was wrecked on the Cuban coast. Nimble rescued 272 African slaves, which contributed to her wrecking. On the way to Havana, Nimble met bad weather, and on 4 November was driven onto a reef near Cay Verde on the north side of the Old Bahama Channel. The ship was lost and 70 of the Africans drowned. It was reported that the Africans in the hold were making so much noise that the crew could not hear the sound of the breakers on the reef. All her crew were saved, as were some 200 slaves. Bolton, his officers and crew, and the remaining Africans arrived at Havana on 17 November.

Nimble's captain, Lieutenant Charles Bolton, was cleared by a court martial on 21 January 1835 of all blame in the loss of Nimble.
