= Robert Bostock (slave trader, born 1743) =

English slave trader born in Tarvin, Cheshire

Robert Bostock (1743, Tarvin – 24 September 1793, Liverpool) was an English slave trader, who was born in Tarvin, Cheshire. He was held to be a "very considerable African merchant". His letterbooks for the period 1779-92 have been found to be very useful for historians researching the slave trade of that era. They provide information about his prolific career. Which is ironic as his family tree now includes two mixed race Aboriginal branches.

== Early life ==
Robert was the son of Peter Bostock, a joiner living in Tarvin and his wife Elizabeth, née Blease, who died shortly after Robert's birth. His father remarried two years later. However his second wife, Ann, also died, in 1748.

== Slave trader in Liverpool ==
Robert married Elizabeth Wilkinson in Tarvin in 1770 and by 1772 was living in Liverpool. He joined the congregation of St Anne's Church, Liverpool, occupying three pews. Charles Wilkinson was related to him and worked as his agent in London before settling on the Rio Pongo. Richard Bostock maintained correspondence with him there.

== Slave trading voyages ==
The information here is based on "Robert Bostock of Liverpool and the British Slave Trade on the Upper Guinea Coast, 1769-93" by Denise Jones. She uses the Voyage ids from the Slave Voyages database which she has collated with Bostock's Letterbook. The one exception from 1792 does not appear on the database.

Voyage id	Ship	Date left	Date return	Captain	Owner	No. of enslaved Africans	Location in Africa	Location in Americas	Notes
#91581	Little Ben	30 Aug 1769	1 June 1770	Robert Bostock	Robert Bostock; Thomas Ratcliffe	79 of 80*	Cape Mount	Dominica (DB)	This was a smaller ship, a sloop of 40 tons, later replaced by a larger ship
#91582	Little Ben	14 Aug 1770	7 June 1771	Robert Bostock	Robert Bostock; Thomas Ratcliffe; William Mason	64 of 82*	Windward Coast	Dominica (DB)	
#91783	Little Ben	17 July 1771	17 April 1772	Thomas Melling	Robert Bostock; Thomas Ratcliffe; William Mason	65 of 83*	Windward Coast	Dominica (DB)	
#91801	Townside	23 Aug 1771	4 Sept 1772	Robert Bostock	Robert Bostock; Thomas Ratcliffe; William Mason	197 of 230*	Windward Coast	Dominica (DB)	
#91896	Little Ben	7 July 1772	26 August 1773	Thomas Melling	Robert Bostock; Thomas Ratcliffe; Thomas Harvey	106 of 124*	Windward Coast	South Carolina (DB)	
#91802	Townside	23 Aug 1771		John Barber	Robert Bostock; Thomas Ratcliffe; William Mason				Shipwrecked near Cape Mount
#91972	Burrowes	9 May 1773	1 April 1774	Robert Bostock	Robert Bostock; Thomas Ratcliffe; Thomas Harvey; William Mason	220 of 270*	Windward Coast	Barbados (DB)	
#91897	Little Ben	30 Sept 1773		Thomas Melling	Robert Bostock; Thomas Ratcliffe; Thomas Harvey	0 of 230*	Windward Coast	South Carolina (DB)	Shipwrecked off coast of Africa
#92517	Burrowes	29 May 1774	26 May 1775	Robert Withington	Robert Bostock; Thomas Ratcliffe; Thomas Harvey; William Mason	168 of 206*	Windward Coast	Barbados (DB)	
#91973	Bostock	20 April 1776	27 Jan 1777	James Briggs	Robert Bostock; Thomas Ratcliffe; Rob Green; William Kirke; Rob Oliphant; James Briggs	328 of 359*	Bonny	Saint Croix (DB)	
#92591	Matty and Betty	4 June 1777		John Hewan	Robert Bostock; Thomas Ratcliffe	328 of 359*	Africa (unspecified)	Martinique (DB)	Ship captured by an American privateer off Barbadoes. The enslaved Africans on board and taken to Martinique. Insurance deemed fraudulent by a London jury, 29 May 1780.
#92478	Little Ben	26 October 1778		Robert Bostock	Robert Bostock; Thomas Ratcliffe	195 of 210*	Africa (unspecified)	Jamaica (DB)	This was another larger ship, a brig named Little Ben, (100 tons)
#80704	Bud	23 June 1783	12 June 1784	John Spuritt	Robert Bostock; Thomas Foxcroft; William Rice; James Welsh; Felix Doran; George Welch	175 of 189*	Cape Mount	St Kitts (DB)	
#80587	Bloom	13 Aug October 1783	4 Nov 1784	Robert Bostock	Robert Bostock; Thomas Foxcroft; William Rice; Aretas Warton; Felix Doran; George Welch; James Welch	307*	Cape Mount	Antigua (DB)	In Antigua he sold the enslaved Africans for £35-£45 a head. He then bought a cargo of molasses and tobacco with which he returned to Liverpool. The profit of the trip was £9,635 9s 7d, of which he received £360 14s 3d.

- 1786: Bostock purchased the schooner Jemmy, of 86 tons (bm) which he then captained. They departed Liverpool on 3 April 1786. He acquired an estimated 161 enslaved Africans on the Windward Coast. He transported the captives to Antigua, where he arrived with 150.
