= Thomas Foxcroft (slave trader) =

English slave trader (1733–1809)

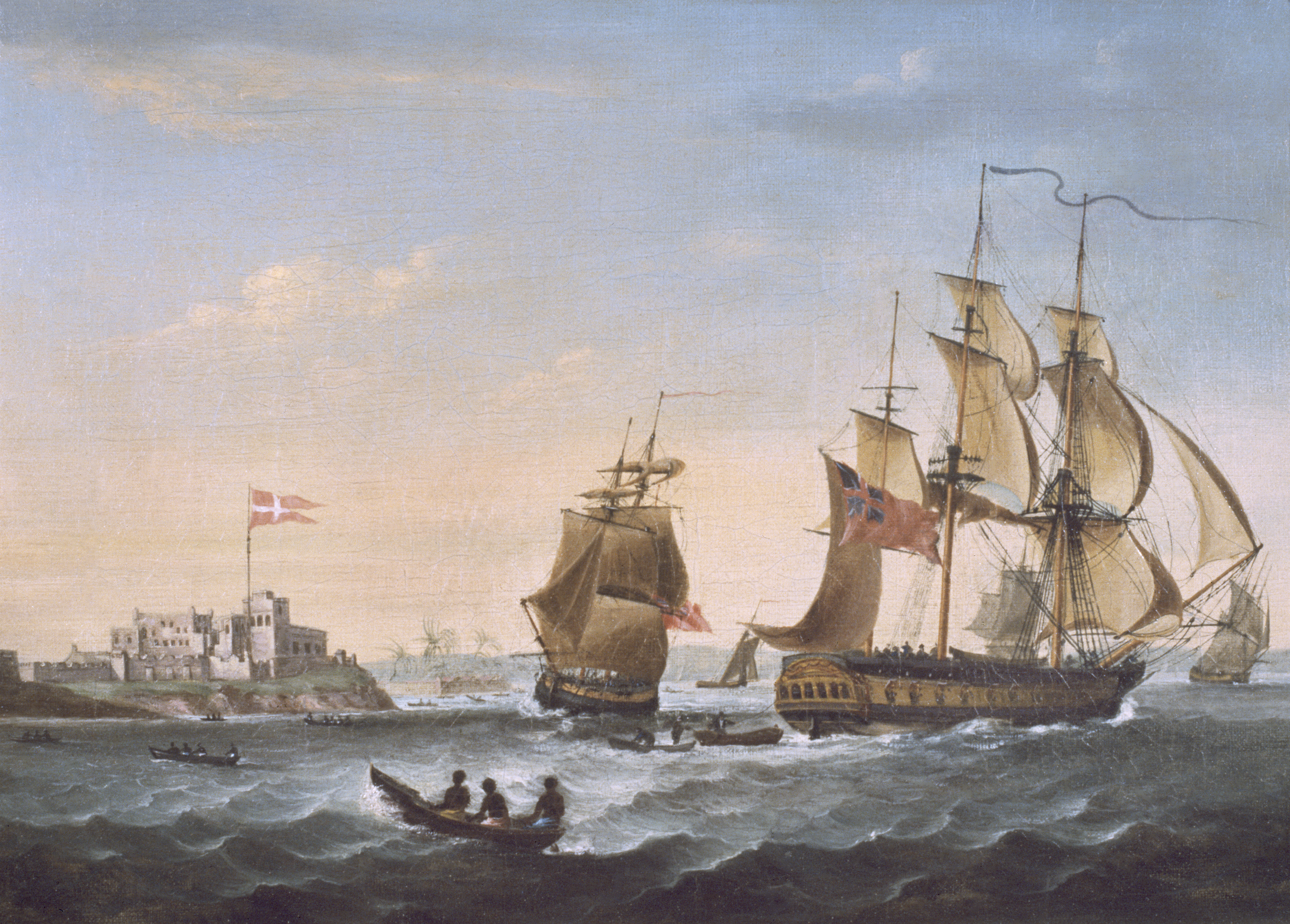
Two British slave-ships off Fort Christiansborg taking on board enslaved people, painting by George Webster

Thomas Foxcroft (1733–1809) was an English slave trader. He was responsible for at least 91 slave voyages in the years between 1759 and 1792. A contemporary set of financial accounts for one slave voyage by his slave-ship Bloom has been preserved. Captain Robert Bostock, Bloom's master, bought 349 enslaved people in Africa; 42 captives died and 307 captives were sold in the West Indies for £9858. The net profit on the voyage to the owners amounted to £8,123 7s 2d, or £26 9s 2d per captive sold.

== Early life ==
Foxcroft was born in Thornton in Lonsdale, in Yorkshire. His father was George Foxcroft.

== Slave trade ==
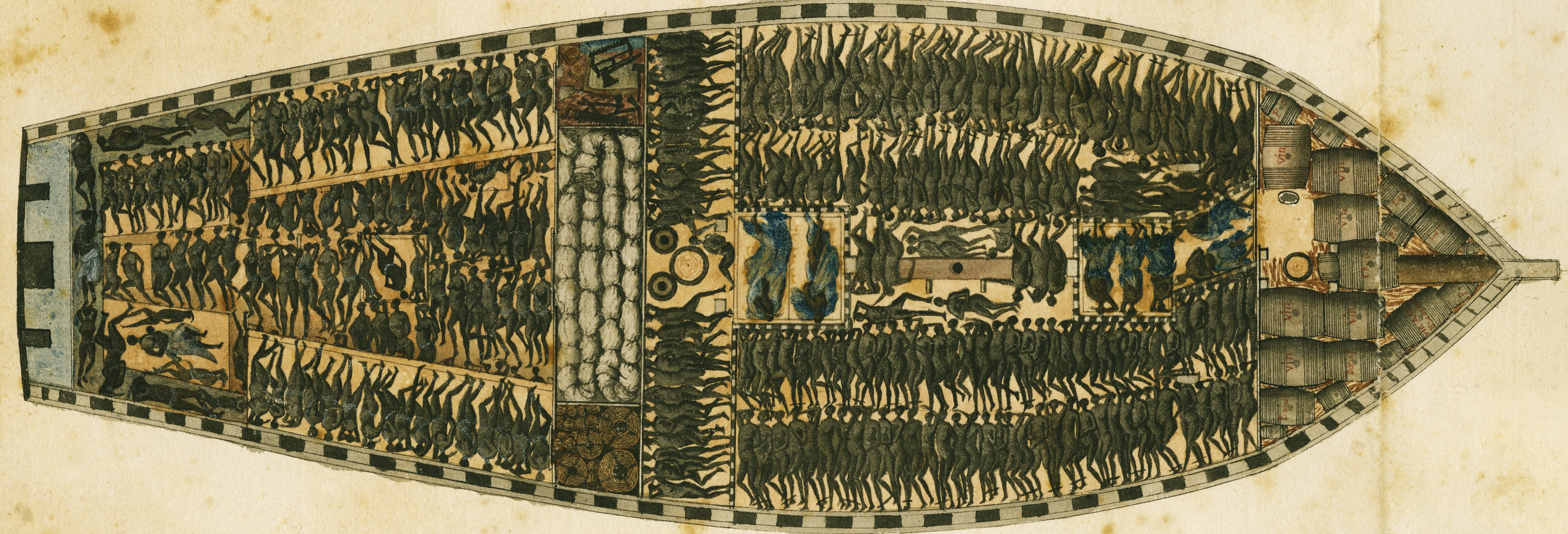
A painting of the slave deck of a slave ship, showing shackled Africans

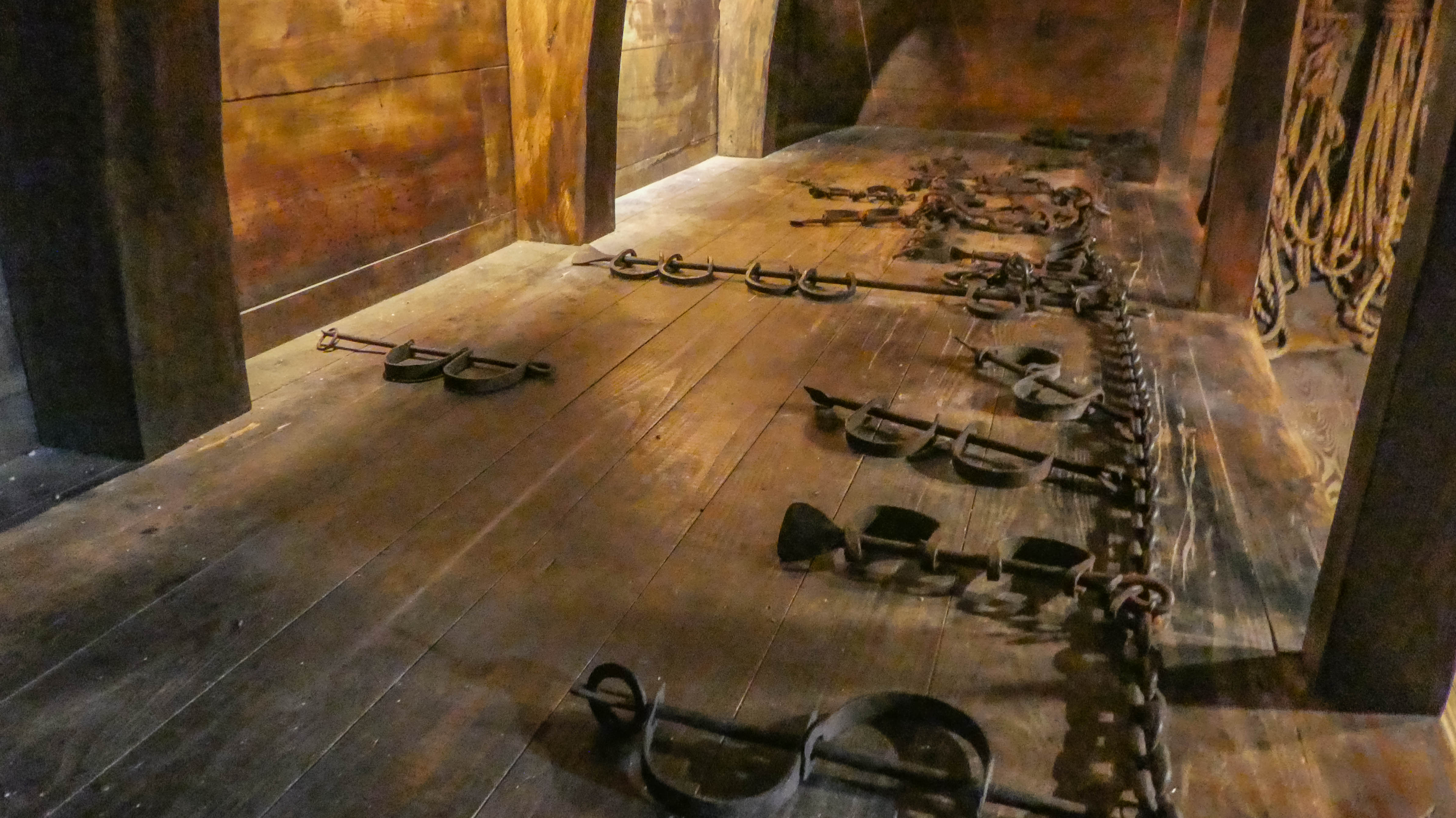
Slave shackles

Foxcroft was related to the Welch family through his sister Agnes's marriage to Robert Welch in 1752. The Welch family were prominent in the slave trade and it is this link that is the likely reason for Foxcroft to move to Liverpool. From there he began slave trading from the Port of Liverpool. He regularly partnered with the slave traders George Welch and James Welch, and he invested in one slave voyage with John Welch in 1759.

Thomas Foxcroft's niece, Mary Foxcroft, married one of his regular slave trading partners, Felix Doran. After Doran died in 1776, Foxcroft became a slaving partner of his son, who was also called Felix Doran.

Foxcroft was the owner of the slave ship Bloom. A contemporary set of financial accounts for a slave voyage by Bloom in 1784 exists. The accounts offer insight into the costs, profit, cargo and the purported value of the enslaved people it transported. Robert Bostock the captain of Bloom bought 349 enslaved people from the Windward Coast of Africa and transported them to the West Indies to be sold. 42 people died during the voyage, or died after landing but before they were sold. Of the 307 people that were sold, 103 were men, 51 were women, 99 were boys and 54 were girls. In total they were sold for £9858 (equivalent to £1,523,000 in 2023). Gomer Williams writes that the cost of buying an enslaved person in Africa in 1798–1799 was £20 to £25, with a sale price in the West Indies of £70 (equivalent to £11,000 in 2023), concluding that Foxcroft made a very large profit at the expense of the captive Africans.

Bloom was condemned and broken up in 1789. Her owners, Foxcroft, Doran, Welch, Welsh, and others, replaced her with a new Bloom.

In 1793 the Port of Liverpool underwent a commercial crisis. This may have impelled most of the partners to leave enslaving. They still owned three enslaving vessels: Bloom, King Grey, and Bud. They sold Bloom and Bud when the vessels returned to Liverpool in 1793, though John Welsh retained an interest in Bud. A French privateer captured King Grey in 1793. HMS Hyaena quickly recaptured her brought her into Kingston, where the King Grey and her cargo of captives were sold; her captain and crew were also rescued.

By 1793, Thomas Foxcroft was 60. He had started investing in the enslaving business at age 26, and by 1793 had invested in 92.

== Personal life ==
Foxcroft's family home was Halsteads in Thornton in Lonsdale. In his will Foxcroft gave a large part of his estate to his nephew Reverend Thomas Hammond Foxcroft who was living at Halsteads. Halsteads has been listed Grade II on the National Heritage List for England since February 1958.
