= Bloom (ship) =

Several vessels have been named Bloom.

== Bloom (1781 ship) ==
- Bloom (1781 ship) was launched in the Thirteen Colonies in 1781. She was taken in prize in 1782. She became a Liverpool-based slave ship and from 1783 on made four complete voyages in the triangular trade in enslaved people. She was broken up in 1789.

== Bloom (1789 ship) ==
- Bloom (1789 ship) was launched in 1789 at Liverpool as a Guineaman. She made three complete voyages as a slave ship in the triangular trade in enslaved people. She then made a voyage as a West Indiaman, before trading between Cork and Liverpool. She was last listed in 1799.

== Other ==
- Bloom, Rossiter, master, foundered on 14 September 1805 while sailing from Delaware to Bilbao. Two men drowned.
