= Felix Doran =

Felix Doran may refer to:

- Felix Doran (musician)
- Felix Doran (slave trader)
