= Bud (1783 ship) =

History

Great Britain
- Name: Bud
- Launched: 1783, Liverpool
- Fate: Condemned circa June 1801

General characteristics
- Tons burthen: 1783: 97 (bm); 1789: 162, or 169 (bm)
- Length: 65 ft 0 in (19.8 m)
- Beam: 19 ft 4 in (5.9 m)
- Complement: 28
- Armament: 14 × 3-pounder guns + 2 swivel guns
- Notes: Two decks & three masts

Bud was launched at Liverpool in 1783. Between 1783 and 1800 she made 12 complete voyages as a slave ship in the triangular trade in enslaved people. In 1796 she repelled an attack by a faster, better armed, and more heavily crewed French privateer in a single ship action. Then in 1798, a French privateer captured her in another single ship action after Bud's short but sanguinary resistance. The Royal Navy quickly captured her, and her captor. On her 13th enslaving voyage she was condemned at Kingston, Jamaica after she had arrived with her captives.

== Career ==
Bud's owners were Thomas Foxcroft, William Rice, James Welsh, Felix Doran, George Welch, and Robert Bostock.

Design: Liverpool’s merchants chose Bud for her shallow draft (seven and a half feet), which made her suitable for ports in Upper Guinea, her low profile, and speed and maneuverability. She was galley-built, and so had no quarterdeck or forecastle; her upper deck had a straight run from bow to stern. She had one 55-foot square grating for her primary ventilation. The builder also put in two ventilation ports (airports), one probably forward and the other aft. The height between the lower and upper deck was five feet. She had platforms in the men's room and in the boys' room, but none in the women's room. The men's room (840 square feet), accounted for 64% of the space allocated to the slaves, the boys' room (165 square feet), accounted for 13%, and the women's room (298 square feet), for 23%. Because the men were shackled together, they were allocated more space per person than the boys or women, who were not shackled, and so could be crowded together more closely.

1st voyage transporting enslaved people (1783–1784): Captain John Spuritt sailed from Liverpool on 23 June 1783. He acquired captives at Cape Grand Mount. Bud arrived at St Kitts on 24 March 1784 with 175 captives. She arrived back at Liverpool on 12 June 1784.

2nd voyage transporting enslaved people (1784–1785): Captain George Huaitt sailed from Liverpool on 28 July 1785, bound for the Windward Coast. Bud acquired slaves between Rio Nuñez and the Assini River. She arrived at Dominica on 18 January 1785 with 185 captives. She sailed for Liverpool 22 February 1785 and arrived back there on 19 April. She had left Liverpool with 32 crew members and had arrived at Dominica with 16. By the time she arrived back at Liverpool she had suffered 11 crew deaths in all.

3rd voyage transporting enslaved people (1785–1786): Captain Huaitt sailed from Liverpool on 28 July 1785, bound for Nuñez-Assini. When she reached the West Indies Bud stopped at Barbados, with 238 captives, before going on to Trinidad and Tobago. She arrived at Trinidad and Tobago in April 1786 with 238 captives. She sailed for Liverpool on 10 May and arrived back home on 8 July. At some point Captain Caesar Otway replaced Huaitt. She had left Liverpool with 31 crew members and had suffered five crew deaths on her voyage.

4th voyage transporting enslaved people (1786–1788): Captain John Cash sailed from Liverpool on 1 November 1786, and acquired captives at Nuñez-Assini. Bud arrived at St Kitts on 1 December 1787. She embarked 200 captives and she arrived with 191, for a 4% mortality rate. She arrived back at Liverpool on 3 March 1788. She had left Liverpool with 30 crew members and she had suffered 10 crew deaths on her voyage.

5th voyage transporting enslaved people (1788–1789): Captain John Clare Liverpool on 4 September 1788. He acquired captives at Cape Grand Mount and arrived at Grenada on 11 April 1789 with 159 captives. Bud arrived back at Liverpool on 14 July. She had left Liverpool with 22 crew members and had suffered seven crew deaths on her voyage.

In 1789, Bud's owners had her lengthened. The Slave Trade Act 1788 (Dolben's Act) was the first British legislation passed to regulate the shipping of enslaved people. The Act limited the number of enslaved people that British slave ships could transport, based on the ships' tons burthen. At a burthen of 97 tons, the cap would have been 162 captives; at a burthen of 162 tons, the cap was 270 captives.

6th voyage transporting enslaved people (1789–1791): Captain Clare sailed from Liverpool on 7 October 1789. He acquired captives at Bassa, and arrived at Grenada in October 1790 with 230 captives. Bud left Grenada on 16 November, and arrived back at Liverpool on 5 January 1791. She had left Liverpool with 30 crew members and had suffered nine crew deaths on her voyage.

7th voyage transporting enslaved people (1791–1792): Captain Clare sailed from Liverpool on 30 March 1791. He started embarking captives at Cape Grand Mount and sailed from Africa on 9 March 1792. Bud arrived at Grenada on 9 April. She had embarked 264 captives and she arrived with 243, for a 9% mortality rate. She sailed for Liverpool on 10 May 1792, and arrived home on 23 June. She had left Liverpool with 25 crew members and had suffered eight crew deaths on her voyage.

8th voyage transporting enslaved people (1792–1793): Captain Clare sailed from Liverpool on 10 September 1792. He acquired captives in West Africa, and arrived at Grenada on 1 June with 269. Bud sailed from Grenada on 3 July and arrived back at Liverpool on 21 August. She had left Liverpool with 22 crew members and had suffered five crew deaths on her voyage.

In 1793 the Port of Liverpool underwent a commercial crisis. This may have been a factor in most of Bud's owners deciding to leave the triangular trade. In 1793, they still owned three enslaving vessels: Bloom, King Grey, and Bud. They sold Bloom and Bud when these vessels returned to Liverpool in 1793, though John Welsh retained an interest in Bud. A French privateer captured King Grey in 1793. HMS Hyaena quickly recaptured her and brought her into Kingston, where King Grey and her cargo of captives were sold; her captain and crew were also rescued.

Bud's new owners were John Tarleton, John Holland Pemberton, John Smith, John Welsh, and Joseph Mathews.

9th voyage transporting enslaved people (1794): Captain Joseph Matthews acquired a letter of marque on 21 December 1793. He sailed from Liverpool on 14 January 1794, and started embarking captives at Cape Coast Castle on 24 March. He also acquired captives at Anomabu. Bud sailed from Africa on 23 May, and arrived at Kingston, Jamaica on 11 July with 273 captives. She left Kingston on 22 August and arrived back at Liverpool on 27 October 1794. She had left Liverpool with 27 crew members and suffered five crew deaths on her voyage.

10th voyage transporting enslaved people (1794–1795): Captain Thomas Smerdon sailed from Liverpool on 13 December 1794. He started acquiring captives at Cape Coast Castle on 16 February 1795. He also acquired captives at Anomabu. Bud left Africa on 14 April 1795. She arrived at Montego Bay on 15 June. She had embarked 281 captives and she arrived with 276, for a mortality rate of 1.8%.

After the passage of Dolben's Act, masters received a bonus of £100 for a mortality rate of under 2%; the ship's surgeon received £50. For a mortality rate between two and three per cent, the bonus was halved. There was no bonus if mortality exceeded 3%. (Note: At the time the monthly wage for a captain of a slave ship out of Bristol was £5 per month.)

Bud arrived back at Liverpool on 18 October 1795. She had left Liverpool with 26 crew members and had suffered three crew deaths on her voyage. Budd, Smirdon, master, arrived at Liverpool from Jamaica after having been aground at Donaghadee.

11th voyage transporting enslaved people (1796–1797): Captain Smerdon sailed from Liverpool on 30 January 1796. In 1796, 103 vessels sailed from English ports, bound for Africa to acquire and transport enslaved people; 94 of these vessels sailed from Liverpool.

Budd, Smirdon, master, was reported having been on the coast. She had lost her boats in the Channel as she was outbound. She started embarking captives at Cape Coast Castle on 7 April. She also gathered captives at Anomabu. She sailed from Africa on 20 July, and arrived at Kingston, Jamaica on 20 September with 266 captives.

On his arrival at Kingston, Smerdon wrote to Bud's owners, describing an engagement that he had had with a French privateer. Bud was sailing from the Windward Islands when a French privateer started to chase her. The privateer was faster than Bud so Smerdon prepared for combat and hove too. The privateer approached and fired two broadsides, the shots going over Bud, before Smerdon returned fire, though her guns could not reach the privateer. The privateer lost her stays and was force to wear, bringing her close to Bud. Smerdon took advantage of the situation to fire a broadside from his starboard guns, before going around the privateer and firing his larboard guns. Bud's guns were loaded with shot and grape and did some damage. The privateer then withdrew, with Bud in pursuit, but unable to keep up. Bud had no casualties and only some holes above her waterline.

Bud sailed from Kingston on 17 October and arrived back at Liverpool on 14 January 1797. She had left Liverpool with 26 crew member and had suffered five crew deaths on her voyage.

12th voyage transporting enslaved people (1798–1800): Captain Robert Tyrer sailed from Liverpool on 9 September 1798. In 1798, 160 vessels sailed from English ports, bound for Africa to acquire and transport enslaved people; 149 sailed from Liverpool. This was the largest number in the period 1795–1804.

On 27 September, Bud, of 10 guns and 30 men, Captain Robert Tyrer, bound from Liverpool to the coast of Guinea, was taken in 37°N 18°W, after a severe action of half-an-hour, by the privateer President Parker, of L'Orient. President Parker was armed with 8 brass guns (thirty-six pounders), and one long nine-pounder; she had a crew of 65 men. Bud had two men killed and two wounded.

HMS Caroline and Flora gave chase to and captured President Parker on 4 October, while Caroline also recaptured Bird. President Parker, Captain Ferry, was provisioned for a cruise of six months. The capture letter by Captain R.G. Middleton, of Flora, described the 36-pounder cannons as carronades. (Note: President Parker was the former 81-ton (bm) French naval cutter Poisson Volant. The French navy lent her to private parties and she became the privateer cutter President Parker from Dunkirk. She sailed under J.B. Ferrey with 67 men and ten 4-pounder guns, plus 6 swivel guns. Captain Ferrey was an American. During the period 1797–1798 he captured prizes worth 300,000 livres.) Lloyd's List reported that Bud, Tyne, master, had been captured by a French privateer, and had been recaptured and sent into Madeira. (Note: In 1798, 25 British slavers were lost, 12 on their way from England to Africa. Because Bud was recaptured, she probably wasn't included in these numbers. During the period 1793 to 1807, war, rather than maritime hazards or resistance by the captives, was the greatest cause of vessel losses among British slave vessels.)

Bud returned to her voyage and acquired captives at Bonny. She arrived at Kingston on 27 October 1799, with 260 captives. She sailed from Kingston on 8 December and arrived back at Liverpool on 30 January 1800. She had left Liverpool with 24 crew members and had suffered four crew deaths on her voyage.

13th voyage transporting enslaved people (1800–1801): Captain Tyrer sailed from Liverpool on 6 October 1800. In 1800, 130 vessels sailed from English ports, bound for Africa to acquire and transport enslaved people; 120 of these vessels sailed from Liverpool.

Bud acquired captives at West Africa and arrived at Kingston on 25 May 1801 with 171 captives. She had left Liverpool with 21 crew members and had arrived at Kingston with 18 crew members, having suffered three crew deaths on her voyage. At Kingston Bud was condemned for unseaworthiness.
