= King Grey (1786 ship) =

History

Great Britain
- Name: King Grey
- Namesake: European name for a southern Vai ruler from whom both French and English obtained captives.
- Owner: Thomas Foxcroft and others
- Launched: Disputed
- Acquired: 1786
- Fate: Sunk by enemy fire on 27 December 1795

General characteristics
- Tons burthen: 140, or 145 (bm)
- Length: 71 ft 0 in (21.6 m)
- Beam: 22 ft 4 in (6.8 m)
- Notes: Two decks & three masts

King Grey (or King Gray), first appeared in online British records in 1786. She made five enslaving voyages between 1786 and 1793. On her last enslaving voyage the French captured her but the Royal Navy quickly recaptured her. She was sold at Kingston, Jamaica. She became a privateer but in December 1795 fire from French Republican shore artillery sank her at Tiburon where she was supporting French Royalist forces as an armed ship.

== Origin ==
According to the Liverpool registry, the vessel that became King Grey was American-built and taken in prize from the French. The High Court of Admiralty on 4 September 1782, condemned her as a prize.

King Grey first appeared in Lloyd's Register (LR), in the volume for 1786 with origin Bermuda.

Year	Master	Owner	Trade	Source
1786	G.Hauitt	Foxcroft	Liverpool–Africa	LR

== Career ==
1st voyage transporting enslaved people (1786–1787): Captain George Hauit (or Hewit), sailed from Liverpool on 3 October 1786. He acquired captives at Cape Grand Mount. King Grey arrived at Grenada on 23 August 1787, where she landed 251 captives. She sailed for Liverpool on 16 October and arrived there on 6 December. She had left Liverpool with 41 crew members and had suffered 14 crew deaths on her voyage.

2nd voyage transporting enslaved people (1788–1790): Captain Joseph Cash sailed from Liverpool on 5 May 1788. He acquired captives at Cape Grand Mount and arrived at Grenada on 27 October 1789 with 170 captives. King Grey sailed from Grenada on 11 November and arrived back at Liverpool on 3 January 1790. She had left Liverpool with 38 crew members and suffered 17 crew deaths on her voyage.

3rd voyage transporting enslaved people (1788–1790): Captain Cash sailed from Liverpool on 5 May 1790. He acquired captives at Cape Grand Mount and arrived at Grenada on 7 February 1791 with 240 captives. King Grey arrived back at Liverpool on 5 April. She had left Liverpool with 21 crew members and suffered eight crew deaths on her voyage.

4th voyage transporting enslaved people (1791–1792): Captain Cash sailed from Liverpool on 19 June 1791. He acquired captives at Cape Grand Mount, starting on 9 August and left Africa on 6 June 1792. King Grey arrived at Grenada on 17 April 1791. She had embarked 263 captives and arrived with 244, for an 8% mortality rate on the Middle Passage between Africa and the West Indies. King Grey sailed for Liverpool on 12 May and arrived there on 23 June. She had left Liverpool with 31 crew members and suffered 12 crew deaths on her voyage.

5th voyage transporting enslaved people (1792–1793): Captain Cash sailed from Liverpool on 30 August 1792. He acquired captives at Cape Grand Mount, starting on 17 October, and sailed from Africa on 10 March 1793.

As King Grey approached the West Indies, a French privateer captured her near Puerto Rico. However, HMS Hyaena recaptured her, and drove the privateer ashore at Hispaniola. Captain Cash and his crew, who had been held in irons on the privateer, freed themselves. After taking the privateer's boat they were able to reach Hyaena. (Note: The French captured Hyaena on 25 May 1793. On 27 October 1797 the Royal Navy recaptured Hyène and took her back into service as HMS Hyaena.)

King Grey arrived at Kingston on 16 May. She had embarked 276 captives and arrived with 275, for a less than 1% mortality rate in the Middle Passage. Lloyd's List reported that she had arrived after a French privateer had captured her. HMS Hyena had recaptured King Grey and driven the privateer ashore at Hispaniola.

King Grey was sold in Jamaica. (Note: One source states that King Grey's owners sold her when she returned to Liverpool in 1793, however, there is no evidence that she ever returned to Liverpool. In 1793 the Port of Liverpool underwent a commercial crisis. This may have been what impelled Foxcroft and most of the other investors in King Grey to leave enslaving. At the time they owned three enslaving vessels: Bloom, King Grey, and Bud. They sold Bloom and Bud when the vessels returned to Liverpool in 1793.)

King Grey became a privateer operating out of Jamaica. On 9 November 1793, King Grey, Boaz Bryan, master, captured the United States merchant vessel Sea Flower, Edmund Snow, master, of 58 tons (bm). Sea Flower had been sailing from Port-au-Prince to New York with a cargo of sugar, coffee, and nuts when captured, and was taken into Jamaica. She was condemned, but Saturnine Bernard Garrick, the supercargo, appealed against the condemnation by the Vice court of Admiralty at Jamaica of the vessel and cargo. He appealed on behalf of Thomas Bourn of Sandwich, Massachusetts, and Cornelius Christian Westphal of New York on the grounds that neither the vessel nor her cargo were French property.

In early January 1794, the French schooner Courier came into Port Royal, Jamaica. King Grey had cut her out of "Ackeen". Courier was carrying a cargo of indigo and cotton, and had on board five French gentlemen and "two Negroes".

On 13 January King Grey was in sight when the privateer Polly and Jane captured the brig Lyon, of Salem, Massachusetts.

== Fate ==
In December 1794, the privateer King Grey was reported off the Tiburon Peninsula. In June 1794 the British had occupied several ports in San Domingue.

The British sea defences at the post at Tiburon consisted of King Grey and a battery of three 18-pounder guns. (Note: The naval historian William James mistakenly identified the ship as King George, while acknowledging that the London Gazette referred to her as King Grey.) The troops consisted of 450 French Royalist soldiers, including some Royalist Blacks under the command of Jean Kina. A British lieutenant from the 23rd Regiment of Foot was the British liaison. King Grey was anchored with springs on her cables at the harbour's entrance. On 25 December three French armed vessels arrived on the seaward side as a force of some 3000 Republican troops, including some 800 regulars, approached on the landward side. The French established a battery consisting of one 18-pounder gun, one 9-pounder gun, two 4-pounder and two 2-pounder guns, and one 8" mortar on a position from which they could fire down on King Grey and the Royalist battery. The Republican vessels and the battery concentrated their fire on King Grey. The engagement between King Grey and the Republicans lasted for about 48 hours. Eventually, King Grey had sustained so many holes that she sank almost to her gun deck. Finally, a red hot shot hit her magazine, which blew up. All aboard were killed. (Another account states describes King Grey as an "armed ship in His Majesty's Service". It states that a bombshell [from the mortar] destroyed the magazine and that part of the crew drowned. It also reported that King Grey's master was Captain MacIver.)

The Republicans next succeeded in destroying the 3-gun battery on shore. One of the guns had burst on its first shot, and gunfire dismounted the other two. Next, the Republicans attacked the upper fort. They succeeded in driving out the defenders on 19 December after causing some 100 casualties, forcing them to retire to Cape Donna Maria, which was about seven leagues to the north of Cape Tiburon.
