= List of shipwrecks in 1774 =

The List of shipwrecks in 1774 includes some ships sunk, wrecked or otherwise lost during 1774.

table of contents
1774
Jan	Feb	Mar	Apr
May	Jun	Jul	Aug
Sep	Oct	Nov	Dec
Unknown date

== January ==
=== 5 January ===
List of shipwrecks: 5 January 1774
Ship	State	Description
Betsey	Great Britain	The ship foundered in the English Channel off Portland, Dorset. Her crew were rescued. She was on a voyage from Sunderland, County Durham to Dartmouth, Devon.

=== 6 January ===
List of shipwrecks: 6 January 1774
Ship	State	Description
Martha	Great Britain	The ship was driven ashore and wrecked at Brighthelmstone, Sussex. She was on a voyage from Newry, County Antrim, Ireland to London.

=== 8 January ===
List of shipwrecks: 8 January 1774
Ship	State	Description
Brothers	Ireland	The ship was lost in Strangford Lough with the loss of all on board.
Garland	(Kingdom of Great Britain) British America	The ship was wrecked at Madeira with the loss of eight of her crew.
Hankey	Great Britain	The ship was lost at Madeira when another vessel was driven into her. Twenty-four lives were lost.
Harriot	Great Britain	The ship was wrecked at Madeira with the loss of nine of her crew.
Hoppet	Sweden	The ship was wrecked at Madeira. Her crew were rescued.
Jesus Maria José	Portugal	The ship was wrecked at Madeira with the loss of five of her crew.
Nossa Senhora do Monte	(flag) Portugal	The ship was wrecked at Madeira with the loss of nine of her crew.
Richard & Mary	Great Britain	The ship was driven ashore at Madeira. Her crew were rescued.
Tryon	Great Britain	The ship was wrecked at Madeira with the loss of five of her crew.

=== 10 January ===
List of shipwrecks: 10 January 1774
Ship	State	Description
Jenny & Peggy	Great Britain	The ship foundered in the Atlantic Ocean off Land's End, Cornwall. Her crew were rescued by a Dutch ship.
John & Samuel	Great Britain	The ship was driven ashore at Great Yarmouth, Norfolk. She was on a voyage from Cork, Ireland to Great Yarmouth.

=== 12 January ===
List of shipwrecks: 12 January 1774
Ship	State	Description
Mercury	Kingdom of Great Britain	The hospital boat was burned at Nick's Cove, Massachusetts.

=== 17 January ===
List of shipwrecks: 17 January 1774
Ship	State	Description
Francis	Ireland	The ship was wrecked off Bray, County Wicklow with some loss of life. She was on a voyage from Bordeaux, France to Dublin.

=== 19 January ===
List of shipwrecks: 19 January 1774
Ship	State	Description
Young Cornelins	Ireland	The ship was wrecked at Ardmore Head, County Cork with the loss of her captain. She was on a voyage from the Grenada to Cork.

=== Unknown date ===
List of shipwrecks: Unknown date 1774
Ship	State	Description
Albion	Great Britain	The ship was lost near Great Yarmouth, Norfolk. She was on a voyage from Newcastle upon Tyne, Northumberland to London.
Baron Hope	(Kingdom of Great Britain) Jersey	The ship was driven ashore at Penzance, Cornwall. She was on a voyage from the Île de Ré, France to Jersey.
Carlisle	Great Britain	The ship was driven ashore and wrecked near Winterton-on-Sea, Norfolk. She was on a voyage from Blyth, Northumberland to London.
Defiance	Great Britain	The ship was lost on the Barbary Coast.
Dove	Great Britain	The ship was driven ashore near Great Yarmouth. She was on a voyage from Newcastle upon Tyne to Great Yarmouth.
Goodwill	Great Britain	The ship caught fire and sank in the River Thames. She was on a voyage from London to Waterford, Ireland. Goodwill was later refloated.
Jenny	Great Britain	The ship was wrecked on the Burbo Bank, in Liverpool Bay. She was on a voyage from "Loughlarn" to Liverpool, Lancashire.
Mary	Ireland	The ship was lost on the Île d'Oléron, France. She was on a voyage from Cork to Bordeaux, France.
Prestean Bory	Denmark	The ship was wrecked on the Goodwin Sands, Kent, Great Britain. Her crew were rescued. She was on a voyage from Copenhagen to Saint Croix.
Princessa	Great Britain	The ship was wrecked in the English Channel off Plymouth, Devon. She was on a voyage from Lyme, Dorset to the West Indies.
Sisters	Great Britain	The ship was driven ashore at Winterton-on-Sea. She was on a voyage from Burlington, Yorkshire to London.
Sally	Great Britain	The collier was driven ashore near Flamborough Head, Yorkshire.
St Lawrence	Great Britain	The ship was lost near Santa Petri, Spain. She was on a voyage from Gibraltar to Cádiz, Spain.
Unicorn	Great Britain	The ship was lost on the coast of Norway.

== February ==
=== 1 February ===
List of shipwrecks: 1 February 1774
Ship	State	Description
Molly	Great Britain	The brig was wrecked on the Seven Stones Reef. Her crew were rescued. She was on a voyage from London to Liverpool, Lancashire.

=== 5 February ===
List of shipwrecks: 5 February 1774
Ship	State	Description
HMS Looe	Great Britain	The 44-gun, fifth rate, Royal Navy warship, grounded off the coast of Florida during the War of Jenkins' Ear. HMS Looe was towing a captured Spanish merchant ship, which also grounded. Both ships were salvaged for provisions and set alight.The Looe Key National Marine Sanctuary, part of the Florida Keys is named after the ship.

=== 7 February ===
List of shipwrecks: 7 February 1774
Ship	State	Description
Sally	Great Britain	The ship was driven ashore in Tranmoore Bay. Her crew were rescued. She was on a voyage from Pool, Dorset to Liverpool, Lancashire.

=== 16 February ===
List of shipwrecks: 16 February 1774
Ship	State	Description
Triton	France	The ship was driven ashore and wrecked in Mount's Bay, Cornwall, Great Britain. She was on a voyage from Bordeaux to Calais. Six people in a pilot boat that went to her assistance were drowned when it capsized.

=== 20 February ===
List of shipwrecks: 20 February 1774
Ship	State	Description
Le Paix	France	The ship was lost at "Villa de Cans". She was on a voyage from Marseille to Dunkirk.
Nelly & Ann	Great Britain	The ship departed from Leith, Lothian for Rotterdam, Dutch Republic. No further trace, presumed foundered in the North Sea with the loss of all hands.

=== 27 February ===
List of shipwrecks: 27 February 1774
Ship	State	Description
Industry	Great Britain	The ship ran aground in the Thames Estuary 4 nautical miles (7.4 km) off Faversham, Kent and was wrecked. She was on a voyage from London to Maryland, British America.

=== Unknown date ===
List of shipwrecks: Unknown date 1774
Ship	State	Description
Buchannan	(Kingdom of Great Britain) British America	The ship was driven ashore and wrecked near Bayonne, France with the loss of all hands. She was on a voyage from New York to Bordeaux, France.
Fellowship	Great Britain	The ship was lost on the French coast. She was on a voyage from "Guyon" to London.
Garrettstown	Great Britain	The ship struck a rock and was beached. She was later taken in to Chester, Cheshire.
Good Intent	Great Britain	The ship was driven ashore near Ostend, Dutch Republic. She was on a voyage from London to Rotterdam, Dutch Republic. She was later refloated and taken in to Rotterdam.
Granby	Great Britain	The ship was driven ashore and wrecked at Pembroke. She was on a voyage from Chepstow, Monmouthshire to Dublin, Ireland.
Hedwick Elizabeth	Ireland	The ship foundered in the Atlantic Ocean off Cádiz, Spain. She was on a voyage from Dublin to Livorno, Grand Duchy of Tuscany.
John & Mary	Great Britain	The ship was lost in the Shetland Islands with the loss of all hands.
Morning Star	Great Britain	The ship was wrecked on the south coast of the Isle of Wight. She was on a voyage from Maryland, British America to London.
Phenix	Great Britain	The ship was driven ashore at Margate, Kent. She was on a voyage from Seville, Spain to London.
Rebecca	(Kingdom of Great Britain) British America	The ship was lost in the Canary Islands with the loss of all hands. She was on a voyage from Boston, Massachusetts to Africa
Ridge	Great Britain	The ship was driven ashore and wrecked at Saundersfoot, Pembrokeshire. She was on a voyage from Liverpool, Lancashire to Pool, Dorset.
Swift	Great Britain	The ship was lost off the Welsh coast. She was on a voyage from Bristol, Gloucestershire to Coleraine, County Antrim, Ireland.
Two Brothers	Great Britain	The ship was wrecked on the coast of Flanders. She was on a voyage from London to Rotterdam.

== March ==
=== 1 March ===
List of shipwrecks: 1 March 1774
Ship	State	Description
Hercules	France	The ship was lost at Vannes. She was on a voyage from L'Orient to Marseille.

=== Unknown date ===
List of shipwrecks: Unknown date 1774
Ship	State	Description
Dublin	Ireland	The ship was driven ashore and wrecked near Dungeness Lighthouse, Kent, Great Britain. She was on a voyage from London to Dublin.
Helena	Great Britain	The ship was lost near Wexford, Ireland. She was on a voyage from North Carolina, British America to Liverpool, Lancashire.
John & Mary	Great Britain	The ship was lost in the Shetland Islands with the loss of all hands.
Joseph	Great Britain	The ship was lost in the Orkney Islands. Her crew were rescued. She was on a voyage from "Crogore" to Hull, Yorkshire.
Juno	Great Britain	The ship was lost at the mouth of the Elbe.
Providence	Great Britain	The ship was driven ashore at Martinho, Portugal. She was on a voyage from Aberdeen to Lisbon, Portugal.
Resolution	Great Britain	The ship was driven ashore in Tor Bay. She was on a voyage from New England, British America to Plymouth, Devon. Resolution was later refloated and taken in to Plymouth.
Restoration	Great Britain	The ship was driven ashore near Fowey, cornwall. She was on a voyage from Faversham, Kent to Exon, Devon.
St Clara	Great Britain	The ship was wrecked at Tangier, Morocco. She was on a voyage from Gibraltar to Sallee, Morocco.
Union	Great Britain	The ship ran aground in the River Thames near Gravesend, Kent and was damaged. She was on a voyage from Maryland, British America to London.

== April ==
=== 6 April ===
List of shipwrecks: 6 April 1774
Ship	State	Description
Betty	Ireland	The ship was lost near Wexford. She was on a voyage from Philadelphia, Pennsylvania to Belfast, County Antrim.

=== 13 April ===
List of shipwrecks: 13 April 1774
Ship	State	Description
Industry	Ireland	The ship was wrecked on Bermuda. She was on a voyage from Limerick to Virginia, British America.
L'Abvn del A.	Spain	The ship was wrecked on the Kentish Knock, in the North Sea. She was on a voyage from Málaga to the Dutch Republic.

=== 14 April ===
List of shipwrecks: 14 April 1774
Ship	State	Description
Huntingdon	British East India Company	The East Indiaman was lost off Johanna, Comoros Islands. Her crew were rescued by Bute ( British East India Company).

=== Unknown date ===
List of shipwrecks: Unknown date 1774
Ship	State	Description
Britannia	Great Britain	The ship was holed by her anchor at Dublin, Ireland and was beached in the River Liffey.
Brothers	Ireland	The ship was holed by her anchor and sank in the River Suir. She was later refloated and beached. Brothers was on a voyage from Waterford to Newfoundland, British America.
Jenny	Great Britain	The ship was wrecked on the Gunfleet Sand, in the North Sea off the coast of Essex. She was on a voyage from Newcastle upon Tyne, Northumberland to London.
Lys	France	The ship foundered in the Atlantic Ocean off the Azores. Her crew survived. She was on a voyage from Saint-Domingue to Bordeaux.
Mount Horn	Great Britain	The ship was wrecked at Limerick, Ireland. She was on a voyage from Grenada to London.
Margaret	Great Britain	The ship foundered in the Strait of Gibraltar. She was on a voyage from Alicante, Spain to a Baltic port.
Robert	Great Britain	The ship was driven ashore and wrecked near Milford Haven, Pembrokeshire. She was on a voyage from Jamaica to Liverpool, Lancashire.
Rose	Great Britain	The ship was lost on a voyage from Perth to the Baltic.

== May ==
=== 1 May ===
List of shipwrecks: 1 May 1774
Ship	State	Description
St Thomas	Ireland	The ship was destroyed by fire at Waterford.

=== 3 June ===
List of shipwrecks: 3 June 1774
Ship	State	Description
Polly	Great Britain	The ship was wrecked on Glover's Reef, in the Caribbean Sea. Her crew were rescued. She was on a voyage from British Honduras to New York, British America.

=== 11 May ===
List of shipwrecks: 11 May 1774
Ship	State	Description
Anna Maria	Sweden	The ship ran aground and sank on the Lynn Sand, in The Wash. Her crew survived. She was on a voyage from Stockholm to London, Great Britain.
Severn	(Kingdom of Great Britain) British America	The ship was wrecked in the Roosevelt Inlet, Delaware. Her crew survived. She was on a voyage from Bristol, Gloucestershire to Philadelphia, Pennsylvania.

=== 25 May ===
List of shipwrecks: 25 May 1774
Ship	State	Description
Martha	Great Britain	The ship was lost on Heneago. She was on a voyage from Jamaica to London.

=== 27 May ===
List of shipwrecks: 27 May 1774
Ship	State	Description
Christian	Great Britain	The ship was lost on the Dutch coast with the loss of seven of her crew. She was on a voyage from Memel, Prussia to London.
Good Hope	Great Britain	The ship was wrecked on the Kentish Knock, in the North Sea. She was on a voyage from Stromstadt, Sweden to Nantes, France.

=== Unknown date ===
List of shipwrecks: Unknown date 1774
Ship	State	Description
Dove	Great Britain	The coaster was lost in St Ives Bay.
Pearl	Great Britain	The ship was driven ashore and wrecked on the Dutch coast. She was on a voyage from South Carolina, British America to Cowes, Isle of Wight.
Polly	Great Britain	The ship was driven ashore at "Lissa". She was on a voyage from Hull, Yorkshire to Saint Petersburg, Russia.
Thomas	Great Britain	The ship foundered in the Baltic Sea. She was on a voyage from London to Saint Petersburg.
Young Tobias	Stettin	The ship was wrecked on the coast of Cornwall, Great Britain. She was on a voyage from Bordeaux, France to Stettin.

== June ==
=== 3 June ===
List of shipwrecks: 3 June 1774
Ship	State	Description
Two Brothers	Great Britain	The ship was lost whilst on a voyage from Amsterdam, Dutch Republic to Great Yarmouth, Norfolk.

=== 4 June ===
List of shipwrecks: 4 June 1774
Ship	State	Description
Salisbury	Great Britain	The ship was wrecked on Cape Corintis, Cuba. Her crew were rescued by King George (Great Britain). Salisbury was on a voyage from Jamaica to Lancaster, Lancashire.

=== 8 June ===
List of shipwrecks: 8 June 1774
Ship	State	Description
Argyle	Great Britain	The ship was wrecked on the Main Reef, in the Caribbean Sea. Her crew were rescued.

=== 14 June ===
List of shipwrecks: 14 June 1774
Ship	State	Description
Generous Planter	Great Britain	The ship capsized in Billingsgate Dock, London.

=== Unknown date ===
List of shipwrecks: Unknown date 1774
Ship	State	Description
Content	Great Britain	The ship capsized in the North Sea with the loss of all but three of her crew. She was on a voyage from Memel, Prussia to Hull, Yorkshire. Content was later towed in to South Shields, County Durham.
Good Friends	Dutch Republic	The ship was wrecked on the Goodwin Sands, Kent, Great Britain. She was on a voyage from Amsterdam to St. Ubes, Portugal.
Maria	Great Britain	The ship was lost in the Cape Verde Islands. Her crew were rescued. She was on a voyage from Bristol, Gloucestershire to Africa.
St Antonio	Portugal	The ship was driven ashore and wrecked on Texel, Dutch Republic. Twenty of her crew were rescued. She was on a voyage from Porto to Hamburg.

== July ==
=== 23 July ===
List of shipwrecks: 23 July 1774
Ship	State	Description
Deborah	Great Britain	The ship departed from Quebec on this date. No further trace, presumed foundered with the loss of all hands.

=== Unknown date ===
List of shipwrecks: Unknown date 1774
Ship	State	Description
Hope	Great Britain	The ship was driven ashore near Dungeness, Kent.
Kitty	Great Britain	The brigantine was driven ashore between Boulogne and Calais, France. She was on a voyage from Porto, Portugal to Dundee, Perthshire.
Nancy	Great Britain	The ship was lost near Kinsale, County Cork, Ireland. She was on a voyage from Jamaica to Liverpool, Lancashire.
Susannah	Great Britain	The ship was driven ashore at "Rickholtz", Russia. She was on a voyage from Saint Petersburg to London.

== August ==
=== 3 August ===
List of shipwrecks: 3 August 1774
Ship	State	Description
Rochard	Great Britain	The ship was lost in Granville Bay, Grenada. She was on a voyage from Grenada to London.

=== 16 August ===
List of shipwrecks: 16 August 1774
Ship	State	Description
Philadelphia Paquet	Great Britain	The ship was wrecked on the West Hoyle sandbank, in Liverpool Bay. She was on a voyage from Liverpool, Lancashire to Maryland, British America.
Tom	Great Britain	The ship was driven ashore near Wallasey, Cheshire. She was on a voyage from Liverpool to Africa.

=== Unknown date ===
List of shipwrecks: Unknown date 1774
Ship	State	Description
Looe	Great Britain	The ship was driven ashore in St Bride's Bay. She was on a voyage from Liverpool, Lancashire to Plymouth, Devon.
Philadelphia Paquet	Great Britain	The ship was wrecked on The Needles, Isle of Wight. Her crew were rescued. She was on a voyage from South Carolina, British America to Cowes, Isle of Wight.

== September ==
=== 3 September ===
List of shipwrecks: 3 September 1774
Ship	State	Description
Svyatoy Pavel (Святой Павел, 'St. Paul')	Imperial Russian Navy	The galiot ran aground at the mouth of the Bolshaya River and was wrecked. All on board were rescued. She was on a voyage from Okhotsk to Bolsheretsk.

=== 6 September ===
List of shipwrecks: 6 September 1774
Ship	State	Description
Elizabeth	Great Britain	The ship was driven ashore and wrecked at Nass Point, Gloucestershire with the loss of 26 of the 37 people on board. She was on a voyage from Bristol, Gloucestershire to Cork, Ireland and Jamaica.

=== 18 September ===
List of shipwrecks: 18 September 1774
Ship	State	Description
Anna Maria	Great Britain	The ship was driven ashore and wrecked at Padstow, Cornwall. She was on a voyage from Jamaica to Bristol, Gloucestershire.
Success	Great Britain	The ship departed from British Honduras for London. No further trace, presumed foundered with the loss of all hands.

=== 20 September ===
List of shipwrecks: 20 September 1774
Ship	State	Description
Anna Maria	Prussia	The ship was wrecked near Stralsund, Swedish Pomerania. She was on a voyage from Königsberg to Amsterdam, Dutch Republic.

=== 29 September ===
List of shipwrecks: 29 September 1774
Ship	State	Description
Thomas and Mary	Great Britain	The ship was lost near King's Lynn, Norfolk during a thunderstorm.

=== 30 September ===
List of shipwrecks: 30 September 1774
Ship	State	Description
Svyataya Yekaterina (Святая Екатерина, 'St. Catherine')	Imperial Russian Navy	The sloop was wrecked near the mouths of the ru:Opala and the ru:Golygina, Kamchatka. She was on a voyage from Okhotsk to the Kamchatka Peninsula.

=== Unknown date ===
List of shipwrecks: Unknown date 1774
Ship	State	Description
Choice	Great Britain	The ship was wrecked on the Haisborough Sands, in the North Sea off the coast of Norfolk, with the loss of all hands.
Commerce	Ireland	The ship was wrecked at Dublin. She was on a voyage from Virginia, British America to Dublin.
Cornelious & Harwood	Great Britain	The ship was driven ashore and wrecked. She was on a voyage from Norway to Harwich, Essex.
Dolphin	Great Britain	The ship was lost near Wexford, Ireland. She was on a voyage from Glasgow, Renfrewshire to Limerick, Ireland.
George	Great Britain	The ship was wrecked in the Elbe. She was on a voyage from Hamburg to London.
Liberty	Great Britain	The ship ran aground and was wrecked off Calais, France. Her crew were rescued. She was on a voyage from Riga, Russia to Lancaster, Lancashire.
Lovely Jane	Great Britain	The ship was driven ashore on "Clantauf Island", Ireland.
Venus	Great Britain	The ship was driven ashore in the Baltic Sea. She was on a voyage from Stockholm, Sweden to London. Venus was later refloated and taken in to Copenhagen, Denmark.

== October ==
=== 11 October ===
List of shipwrecks: 11 October 1774
Ship	State	Description
Minerva (Минерва)	Imperial Russian Navy	The frigate ran argound and was wrecked at the island of sv:Enskär in the Gulf of Finland with the loss of 95 of the 164 people on board. She was on a voyage from Reval to Kronstadt.

=== 22 October ===
List of shipwrecks: 22 October 1774
Ship	State	Description
Dorothy	Great Britain	The ship foundered in the Irish Sea. Her crew survived. She was on a voyage from Liverpool, Lancashire to Ostend, Dutch Republic.

=== 29 October ===
List of shipwrecks: 29 October 1774
Ship	State	Description
Dublin	Great Britain	The ship foundered in the Bay of Biscay. She was on a voyage from Málaga, Spain to London.

=== 30 October ===
List of shipwrecks: 30 October 1774
Ship	State	Description
Nancy	Great Britain	The ship was driven ashore at Carrickfergus, County Antrim, Ireland. She was on a voyage from Liverpool, Lancashire to Belfast, County Antrim.

=== Unknown date ===
List of shipwrecks: Unknown date 1774
Ship	State	Description
Barbara	Great Britain	The ship ran aground and was at Senegal.
Betsey	Ireland	The ship was wrecked on Rattray Head, Aberdeenshire, Great Britain. She was on a voyage from Riga, Russia to Dublin.
Betty	Great Britain	The ship was lost near King's Lynn, Norfolk.
Carron	Great Britain	The ship was lost at Montrose, Forfarshire. She was on a voyage from London to Carron, Falkirk, Stirlingshire.
Endeavour	Great Britain	The ship was lost at Åbo, Sweden. Her crew were rescued. She was on a voyage from Saint Petersburg, Russia to London.
Frederick Maria	Stettin	The ship departed from London, Great Britain for Stettin. No further trace, presumed foundered with the loss of all hands.
George	Great Britain	The ship capsized at Dublin.
Greyhound	Great Britain	The ship departed from Newfoundland, British America for Bristol, Gloucestershire in late October. No further trace, presumed foundered in the Atlantic Ocean with the loss of all hands.
Maria	Great Britain	The ship capsized at Bristol.
Mary	Great Britain	The ship was driven ashore and wrecked on Lessoe, Denmark. She was on a voyage from Coleburg, Prussia to Cádiz, Spain.
Thomas	Great Britain	The ship was wrecked on the Dutch coast. She was on a voyage from Arkhangelsk, Russia to Hamburg.
Three Brothers	Great Britain	The ship was wrecked on the Baltic coast.

== November ==
=== 2 November ===
List of shipwrecks: 2 November 1774
Ship	State	Description
Betsey	Great Britain	African slave trade: The ship capsized in the Atlantic Ocean with the loss of six slaves. She was righted and taken in to New Providence, New Jersey, British America. Betsey was on a voyage from Africa to Saint Augustine, Florida.
Mercury	Great Britain	The ship was wrecked north of the Bahamas in a Hurricane. She was on a voyage from Providence, Rhode Island, British America to Jamaica.

=== 5 November ===
List of shipwrecks: 5 November 1774
Ship	State	Description
Sally	Great Britain	The ship was driven ashore and wrecked 4 leagues (12 nautical miles (22 km)) west of St. Lucar, Spain. She was on a voyage from Newfoundland, British America to Cádiz.

=== 7 November ===
List of shipwrecks: 7 November 1774
Ship	State	Description
Nimrod	Great Britain	The ship was lost in the Isles of Scilly. She was on a voyage from Newfoundland, British America to Ancona, Papal States.

=== 8 November ===
List of shipwrecks: 8 November 1774
Ship	State	Description
Fly	Great Britain	The ship foundered. Her crew were rescued by Venus (Great Britain). Fly was on a voyage from Exeter, Devon to Porto, Portugal.

=== 10 November ===
List of shipwrecks: 10 November 1774
Ship	State	Description
Suffolk	Great Britain	The ship was driven ashore at "Sackfield", Suffolk. She was on a voyage from London to Gainsborough, Lincolnshire.

=== 19 November ===
List of shipwrecks: 19 November 1774
Ship	State	Description
Greenhead	Great Britain	The ship was lost off Gourcey, Dutch Republic.

=== 22 November ===
List of shipwrecks: 22 November 1774
Ship	State	Description
Adventure	Great Britain	The ship departed from Campveer, Dutch Republic for Portsea, Hampshire. No further trace, presumed foundered with the loss of all hands.

=== 24 November ===
List of shipwrecks: 24 November 1774
Ship	State	Description
Friendly Trader	Great Britain	The ship was lost near St. Ives, Cornwall with the loss of her captain. She was on a voyage from Cork to Bristol, Gloucestershire.

=== 25 November ===
List of shipwrecks: 25 November 1774
Ship	State	Description
Ann	Great Britain	The ship was driven ashore at Great Yarmouth, Norfolk. She was on a voyage from London to Dunbar, Lothian.
Ceres	Great Britain	The ship was driven ashore at Great Yarmouth. She was on a voyage from Hamburg to Topsham, Devon.
Corsica	Great Britain	The ship was driven ashore near Corton, Suffolk.
Elizabeth	Great Britain	The ship was driven ashore near Birchington, Kent.
Friendship	Great Britain	The ship was driven ashore near Caister-on-Sea, Norfolk with the loss of her captain.
Gertrude	Great Britain	The ship was driven ashore at Margate, Kent. She was on a voyage from Livorno, Grand Duchy of Tuscany to London. Gertrude was later refloated and taken in to Stangate Creek, in the River Medway.
India	Great Britain	The yacht was driven ashore near Margate.
Peggy	Great Britain	The ship was driven ashore and wrecked near Corton. She was on a voyage from Málaga, Spain to Leith, Lothian.
Roman	Great Britain	The ship was driven ashore and wrecked at Great Yarmouth, Norfolk. She was on a voyage from Bayonne, France to Hull, Yorkshire.
Sally	Great Britain	The ship was driven ashore on the Isle of Sheppey, Kent. She was on a voyage from Nevis to London. Sally was later refloated.
St John Baptista	Spain	The snow was driven ashore at Margate.
Vernon	Great Britain	The ship was driven ashore near Great Yarmouth. She was on a voyage from London to Newcastle upon Tyne, Northumberland and Saint Kitts.
William	Great Britain	The ship was driven ashore and wrecked near Great Yarmouth.

=== 27 November ===
List of shipwrecks: 27November 1774
Ship	State	Description
Lady Lovat	Great Britain	The brigantine was shipwrecked on the south-east point of Anticosti island, (Province of Québec?). The merchandise was lost, but the crew was safe yet stuck on Anticosti. Lady Lovat was on a voyage from Dominica.

=== 28 November ===
List of shipwrecks: 28 November 1774
Ship	State	Description
Maria Christina	Dutch Republic	The snow was abandoned in the Atlantic Ocean (48°36′N 8°40′W) due to the loss of her rudder and all but six of her crew. Survivors were rescued by a British vessel but one of the subsequently died. Maria Christina was on a voyage from "Coraso" to Vlissingen.

=== 30 November ===
List of shipwrecks: 30 November 1774
Ship	State	Description
Bilboa Paquet	Great Britain	The ship was wrecked on the French coast. Her crew were rescued She was on a voyage from Faro, Portugal to Exeter, Devon.

=== Unknown date ===
List of shipwrecks: Unknown date 1774
Ship	State	Description
Brilliant	Great Britain	The ship was driven ashore near Calais, France. She was on a voyage from London to South Shields, County Durham and Jamaica.
Catherina Sophia	Sweden	The ship was wrecked on the Galloper Sand, in the North Sea off the coast of Essex, Great Britain. She was on a voyage from Stockholm to Bristol, Gloucestershire, Great Britain.
Dingley	Great Britain	The ship was driven ashore and wrecked at Southwold, Suffolk with the loss of all hands. She was on a voyage from Stockholm, Sweden to London.
Dorothy	Great Britain	The ship was lost in the Orkney Islands. She was on a voyage from Liverpool, Lancashire to Ostend, Dutch Republic.
Drie Gesusters	Dutch Republic	The ship was driven ashore near Margate, Kent, Great Britain. She was on a voyage from Amsterdam to Brest, France.
Friendship	Great Britain	The ship was driven ashore near Aberdeen. She was on a voyage from Gothenburg, Sweden to Kirkcaldy, Fife.
Glynn	Great Britain	The ship was driven ashore at Great Yarmouth. She was on a voyage from Saint Petersburg to London.
Jacob Phillips	flag unknown	The hoy was driven ashore and wrecked near Wells-next-the-Sea, Norfolk with the loss of all hands.
Jenny	Great Britain	The ship was lost near Aberdeen with the loss of all hands. She was on a voyage from Gothenburg to Berwick upon Tweed.
Leonora	Great Britain	The ship was lost whilst on a voyage from Saint Petersburg, Russia to Leith, Lothian.
Maria Christiana	Denmark	The ship was lost in the Orkney Islands.
Mary & Jenny	Great Britain	The ship was driven ashore and wrecked between Aberdeen and Arbroath, Forfarshire.
Minerva	Great Britain	The ship was lost at Cádiz, Spain. She was on a voyage from Newfoundland, British America to Cádiz
Nancy	Great Britain	The ship was driven ashore and wrecked between Aberdeen and Arbroath.
Otter	Great Britain	The ship was wrecked on the Goodwind Sands, Kent with the loss of four of her six crew. She was on a voyage from Newcastle upon Tyne, Northumberland to Pool, Dorset.
Rebecca	Great Britain	The ship was driven ashore and wrecked on Birch Island, near Kronstadt, Russia. She was on a voyage from Saint Petersburg to London.
Sarah	Great Britain	The ship was driven ashore and wrecked near Caister-on-Sea, Norfolk.
Seaflower	Great Britain	The ship was lost near Ystad, Sweden. She was on a voyage from Saint Petersburg to London.
Swallow	Great Britain	The ship was lost in the Orkney Islands. She was on a voyage from Liverpool to Flensburg, Duchy of Holstein.
Thomas	Great Britain	The ship was driven ashore at the mouth of the Charente.
Unity	Great Britain	The ship was driven ashore on the coast of Lincolnshire. She was on a voyage from Saint Petersburg, Russia to London.
Venus	Great Britain	The ship was lost near Dover, Kent. She was on a voyage from Cephalonia to Hamburg.
Vine	Great Britain	The ship was lost in Norway.
Willingmaid	Great Britain	The ship was destroyed by fire at Bonacas Island, Mosquito Shore.
Young Arnold	Great Britain	The ship was lost off Lowestoft, Suffolk. She was on a voyage from Hamburg to Lisbon, Portugal.

== December ==
=== 2 December ===
List of shipwrecks: 2 December 1774
Ship	State	Description
Good Intent	Ireland	The ship foundered in the English Channel off Salcombe, Devon, Great Britain with the loss of two of her nine crew. She was on a voyage from Dublin to Havre de Grâce, France.

=== 4 December ===
List of shipwrecks: 4 December 1774
Ship	State	Description
Baltic Merchant	Great Britain	The ship was driven ashore at Leith, Lothian. She was on a voyage from Rotterdam, Dutch Republic to Leith.
Margaret & Isabel	Great Britain	The ship was driven ashore at Leith with the loss of six of her crew. She was on a voyage from Rotterdam to Leith.

=== 10 December ===
List of shipwrecks: 10 December 1774
Ship	State	Description
HMS Glasgow	Royal Navy	The 20-gun sixth-rate post ship ran onto rocks at Cohasset, Massachusetts. Refloated and arrived in Boston on the 15th for repairs.

=== 13 December ===
List of shipwrecks: 13 December 1774
Ship	State	Description
Amelie	Great Britain	The ship was wrecked at Porto, Portugal. It was from Québec, and was full of wheat for Bristol.
Bacchus	Great Britain	The ship was wrecked at Porto. From Hull, with diverse goods and 109 wine casks.
George	Great Britain	The ship was wrecked at Porto. Full of rice for Topsham and with 110 wine cask on board.
Kirby Hall	Great Britain	The ship was wrecked at Porto. It was shipwrecked in the first hour of the morning, and was manned by only one person, who was saved by the "St John". Its destination was London, and it contained 262 wine cask.
St John's Gospel (?)	Portugal	The ship was wrecked at Porto. It was full of 30 000 to 40 000 pounds sterling. It was still left on a sandbar by 16th December.

=== 30 December ===
List of shipwrecks: 30 December 1774
Ship	State	Description
Martin	Great Britain	The ship was lost at Milford, Pembrokeshire. She was on a voyage from Virginia, British America to London.

=== Unknown date ===
List of shipwrecks: Unknown date 1774
Ship	State	Description
Argyle	Great Britain	The ship was driven ashore near Berwick upon Tweed. She was on a voyage from London to Leith, Lothian.
Catharina Elizabeth Johannes	Stettin	The ship was driven ashore and wrecked at Aldeburgh, Suffolk, Great Britain. She was on a voyage from Stettin to London.
Elizabeth	Great Britain	The ship was lost in the Isles of Scilly. She was on a voyage from Cádiz, Spain to Dartmouth, Devon.
Fell	Great Britain	The ship was driven ashore on "Lessau" or "Lissan Island". She was on a voyage from Riga, Russia to London. Fell was later refloated and taken in to a Norwegian port for a new rudder to be fitted.
Friendship	Great Britain	The ship was lost at Skagen, Denmark. She was on a voyage from Saint Petersburg, Russia to London.
Helen	Great Britain	The ship was driven ashore and wrecked near Aldeburg. She was on a voyage from Middelburg, Dutch Republic to the Firth of Forth.
Hampshire	Great Britain	The ship was driven ashore and wrecked near Waterford, Ireland.
Hannah	Ireland	The ship was driven ashore. She was on a voyage from Angola to Belfast, County Antrim.
Hereford	Great Britain	The ship was driven ashore near Waterford.
Industry	Great Britain	The ship was lost near Berwick upon Tweed. She was on a voyage from London to Leith.
John	Great Britain	The ship was driven ashore at Whitby, Yorkshire.
Jufrow Johanna Amelia	Prussia	The ship was driven ashore near Stralsund, Swedish Pomerania. She was on a voyage from Königsberg to Lisbon, Portugal.
Kitty	Great Britain	The ship was driven ashore in the Elbe.
Liberty	Great Britain	The ship was wrecked on Cocket Island, Northumberland. She was on a voyage from London to Newcastle upon Tyne, Northumberland.
Mary & Martha	Ireland	The ship was driven ashore and wrecked on the north east coast of Saaremaa, Russia. She was on a voyage from Saint Petersburg to Newry, County Antrim.
Midsummer Blossom	Great Britain	The ship was wrecked on Cocket Island. She was on a voytage from London to Newcastle upon Tyne.
Nesbit	Great Britain	The ship was driven ashore at Cádiz. She was on a voyage from Quebec, British America to Barcelona. Spain.
Newport	Great Britain	The ship was driven ashore at Whitby.
Three Sisters	Great Britain	The ship was lost near Lindisfarne, Northumberland.
Peggy	Great Britain	The ship was lost near Berwick upon Tweed. She was on a voyage from London to Leith.
Prosperous	Great Britain	The ship was driven ashore in Firestone Bay, Devon.
St Brigitta	(Denmark) Norway	The ship was driven ashore and wrecked near Elsinore.
St João Evangelista Pinto	Portugal	The ship was lost at Porto. She was on a voyage from Porto to Bahia, Brazil.
Venus	Great Britain	The ship foundered in Buzzards Bay in mid-December.

== Unknown date ==
List of shipwrecks: Unknown date 1774
Ship	State	Description
Ancona Paquet	Papal States	The ship was wrecked at Ossero, Republic of Venice. She was on a voyage from Trieste to Genoa.
Argyle	Great Britain	The ship was wrecked 5 leagues (15 nautical miles (28 km)) south west of Glover's Reef, Belize.
Augusta	Great Britain	The ship was lost near the Bay of Honduras.
Blundel	Great Britain	African slave trade: The ship was lost at Bonny, Nigeria with the loss of 300 slaves.
Brackney Prince	Great Britain	The ship was lost at Senegal. Her crew were rescued.
Britannia	Great Britain	The whaler was lost off the coast of Greenland.
Cavendish	Great Britain	The ship foundered in the Atlantic Ocean. Her crew were rescued. She was on a voyage from Saint Kitts to Liverpool, Lancashire.
Charming Molly	Ireland	The ship wrecked at Ocracoke, North Carolina, British America. Her crew were rescued. She was on a voyage from Baltimore, Maryland, British America to Belfast, County Antrim
Deborah	Great Britain	The ship foundered in the Grand Banks of Newfoundland. She was on a voyage from Quebec, British America to London.
Diana	Great Britain	The ship was lost at Senegal. She was on a voyage from Senegal to London.
Diana	Great Britain	The ship was lost at Cape Florida, British America. Her crew were rescued. She was on a voyage from Jamaica to Rhode Island, British America.
Elizabeth	Great Britain	The ship was lost near Cape Ann, Massachusetts, British America with the loss of three of her crew. She was on a voyage from Newfoundland to Salem, Massachusetts.
Elizabeth & Mary	Great Britain	The ship was lost at Cape Fear, North Carolina, British America. She was on a voyage from Plymouth, Devon to Cape Fear.
Ellis	Great Britain	African slave trade: The ship was lost on the Isle of Ash, Saint-Domingue. Her 450 slaves were rescued. She was on a voyage from Barbados to Jamaica.
Experiment	Great Britain	The ship was lost in the East Indies.
Fanny	Great Britain	The ship was abandoned in the Atlantic Ocean before 5 February.
Farmer	Great Britain	The ship foundered in the Atlantic Ocean. Her crew were rescued. She was on a voyage from Maryland, British America to London.
Geraundean	Great Britain	African slave trade: The ship was lost at Martinique. Her slaves were rescued.
Grace and Sally	Great Britain	The ship foundered in the Atlantic Ocean. She was on a voyage from Lisbon, Portugal to Virginia, British America.
Hanovor Planta	Great Britain	The ship was lost on Heneaga. Her crew were rescued. She was on a voyage from Jamaica to Philadelphia, Pennsylvania, British America.
Hawk	Great Britain	The vessel was wrecked returning from Philadelphia some time in 1774.
Jamaica Planter	(Kingdom of Great Britain) Jamaica	The ship was lost on Plumb Point, Jamaica. She was on a voyage from Boston, Massachusetts, British America to Port Royal, Jamaica.
Little Ben	Great Britain	The ship was lost on the coast of Africa.
Maria Elizabeth	France	The ship departed from Pondicherry, French India in the autumn of 1774. No further trace, presumed foundered with the loss of all hands.
Mars	Great Britain	The frigate was destroyed by fire at the Île de France, Mauritius.
Mary & Ann	Great Britain	The ship was lost on the coast of North Carolina.
Middleton	Great Britain	The ship was wrecked on the coast of Muscat.
Montague	Great Britain	The ship was wrecked on Cape Florida. She was on a voyage from Jamaica to Liverpool.
Morris & Molly	Ireland	The ship was driven ashore and wrecked at Mergain, Grenada. She was on a voyage from Mergain to Dublin.
Neptune	Great Britain	The whaler was lost off the coast of Greenland. Thirteen crew were rescued by Elizabeth (Great Britain).
Nossa Senhora da Boa Esperança	Portugal	The ship foundered whilst on a voyage from Bahia, Brazil to Porto. Her crew were rescued.
Nossa Senhora da Guia	Portugal	The ship was lost on the Baixas de Senhora Fernando. She was on a voyage from Buenos Aires, Brazil to Lisbon.
Nossa Senhora do Livramento	Portugal	The ship was lost at Mozambique. She was on a voyage from Lisbon to India.
Peggy	Great Britain	The ship was lost near Ferryland, Newfoundland.
Peggy Stewart	Great Britain	The ship arrived at Annapolis, Maryland, British America with a cargo of tea, which was banned. She was burnt by the citizens of the town.
Polly	(Kingdom of Great Britain) British America	The ship was wrecked on the north east of Glover's Reef. Her crew were rescued.
Return	Great Britain	The ship foundered in the Atlantic Ocean. Her crew were rescued by Polly (Great Britain). Return was on a voyage from Grenada to New England, British America.
Rhee	Great Britain	The galley was lost on the Martiers. She was on a voyage from British Honduras to Bristol, Gloucestershire.
Rising Sun	Great Britain	The ship was lost on Isla Aves. She was on a voyage from Africa to America.
Robert & Thomas	Ireland	The ship was lost at Virginia.
Roberts	Great Britain	African slave trade; The ship was destroyed by an explosion at Sierra Leone. Only 30 of the 190 slaves survived.
Rose	(Kingdom of Great Britain) Dominica	The ship was lost on Grande Terre.
Scipio	(Kingdom of Great Britain) British America	The ship at Feraolds Point, in the Piscataqua River. She was on a voyage from New England to the West Indies
Severn	Great Britain	The ship was driven ashore in Delaware Bay. Her crew were rescued. She was on a voyage from Bristol to Philadelphia.
HMS Sphynx	Royal Navy	The sloop, a tender of HMS Canceaux, ran ashore on Cape Ann some time between October and December. Later refloated, repairs completed by 20 February 1775.
Two Friends	Great Britain	The ship foundered in the Atlantic Ocean. She was on a voyage from Bristol to Maryland.
