= Bloom (1781 ship) =

British slave ship (1782–1789)

History

Great Britain
- Name: Bloom
- Launched: 1781, Thirteen Colonies
- Acquired: 1782 by purchase of a prize
- Fate: Broken up 1789

General characteristics
- Tons burthen: 140, or 154 (bm)
- Length: 80 ft 2 in (24.4 m)
- Beam: 21 ft 4 in (6.5 m)
- Armament: 4 × 4-pounder guns
- Notes: Two decks & three masts

Bloom was launched in the Thirteen Colonies in 1781. She was taken in prize in 1782. She became a Liverpool-based slave ship and from 1783 on made four complete voyages in the triangular trade in enslaved people. She was broken up in 1789.

== Career ==
Origin: On 3 August 1782 British forces captured the privateer schooner Bloom, of six guns and a crew of 25 men. Several sources describe her as a being from Salem, Massachusetts, and under the command of Captain Silas Smith. A second source describes her as being from Pennsylvania, and under the command of T. Smith. Although this Bloom is the only vessel of that name reported captured, as of January 2023 there is no available incontrovertible link between her and the slave ship of this article.

Bloom was condemned in the High Court of Admiralty on 15 November 1782. Bloom first appeared in Lloyd's Register (LR), in 1783.

Year	Master	Owner	Trade	Source
1783	Robert Bostock	T.Foxcroft	Liverpool–Africa	LR; raised and thorough repair 1783

1st enslaving voyage (1783–1784): Captain Robert Bostock sailed from Liverpool on 13 August 1783. He acquired captives on the Windward Coast in the Nunez–Assini region. On 1 January 1784 Bloom was reported on the coast of Africa, together with several other enslaving ships, including Brothers. She arrived at St. John's, Antigua and Barbuda on 31 July 1784 with 320 captives and landed 307. She arrived back at Liverpool on 4 November.

Captain Bostock received wages for his role, but the important income for a slave ship captain came from a variety of incentive payments. He received £224 15s 5½d through his ownership of seven "privilege" slaves, £192 14s 2d as a 2% commission, and a "coast commission" of £360 14s 3d, calculated as £4 per £104 of gross profit. Lastly, he owned two 16ths of Bloom. The net profit on the voyage to the owners amounted to £8,123 7s 2d, or £26 9s 2d per captive sold.

2nd enslaving voyage (1785–1786): Captain Thomas Holliday sailed from Liverpool on 11 June 1785. Bloom arrived at Dominica on 22 December with 276 captives. She sailed from Dominica on 2 February 1786 and arrived back at Liverpool on 25 March. She had left Liverpool with 29 crew members and arrived at Dominica with 28; she suffered five crew deaths on her voyage. (Note: Thomas Holliday died on 27 November 1786 while captain of Favourite.)

3rd enslaving voyage (1786–1787): Captain William Cockerill sailed from Liverpool on 15 July 1786. He acquired captives at Cape Grand Mount. Bloom arrived at St John's on 19 April 1784 with captives. She arrived back at Liverpool on 1 October. She had left with 35 crew members and had suffered nine crew deaths on her voyage.

4th enslaving voyage (1787–1789): Captain Cockerill sailed from Liverpool on 15 November 1787. He acquired captives at Nunez-Assini. She sailed from Africa on 24 September 1788 and arrived at Grenada on 12 November with 246 captives. She arrived back at Liverpool on 18 January 1789. She had left Liverpool with 38 crew members and had suffered 17 crew deaths on her voyage.

== Fate ==
Bloom was condemned on 15 April 1789 as unfit for further service. She was broken up in 1789. Her owners replaced her with a new Bloom.
