= List of shipwrecks in 1773 =

The List of shipwrecks in 1773 includes some ships sunk, wrecked or otherwise lost during 1773.

table of contents
1773
Jan	Feb	Mar	Apr
May	Jun	Jul	Aug
Sep	Oct	Nov	Dec
Unknown date

== January ==
=== 4 January ===
List of shipwrecks: 4 January 1773
Ship	State	Description
Ufrow Margarita	Dutch Republic	The ship was in collision with Amy (Great Britain) in the English Channel off Start Point, Devon, Great Britain and sank. Two of her crew were rescued by Amy. Ufrow Margarita was on a voyage from Lisbon, Portugal to Amsterdam.

=== 15 January ===
List of shipwrecks: 15 January 1773
Ship	State	Description
Hibernia	Ireland	The ship was driven ashore on the coast of Zeeland, Dutch Republic and wrecked. She was on a voyage from Limerick to Campveer, Dutch Republic.

=== 17 January ===
List of shipwrecks: 17 January 1773
Ship	State	Description
Industry	Ireland	The ship was lost in Dingle Bay. She was on a voyage from Philadelphia, Pennsylvania, British America to Drogheda, County Louth

=== 19 January ===
List of shipwrecks: 19 January 1773
Ship	State	Description
Blandford	Great Britain	The ship was driven ashore between Ayr and Irvine, Ayrshire.
Christian	Great Britain	The ship was driven ashore at Ardmore, Barra, Outer Hebrides. She was on a voyage from Virginia, British America to a French port.
Juno	Great Britain	The ship foundered off the west Scottish coast with the loss of all hands. She was on a voyage from Cape Fare, North Carolina, British America to Greenock, Renfrewshire.
Peggy	Great Britain	The ship was driven ashore at Ardmore. She was on a voyage from Virginia to Cette, France.
Phœbe & Peggy	Ireland	The ship struck rocks in St Bride's Bay near Solva, Pembrokeshire, Great Britain and was wrecked with the loss of fifteen passengers and crew. Four rescuers were also lost. She was on a voyage from Philadelphia, Pennsylvania, British America to Newry, County Antrim.

=== 20 January ===
List of shipwrecks: 20 January 1773
Ship	State	Description
Walworth	Great Britain	The ship was driven ashore near Londonderry, Ireland.

=== 24 January ===
List of shipwrecks: 24 January 1773
Ship	State	Description
New Britannia	Great Britain	African slave trade: The ship was destroyed by an explosion off the coast of Africa. A total of 222 slaves, 90 free natives and thirteen crew were killed.

=== 25 January ===
List of shipwrecks: 25 January 1773
Ship	State	Description
Venus	Great Britain	The ship was abandoned on the Blasques, County Kerry, Ireland.

=== 29 January ===
List of shipwrecks: 29 January 1773
Ship	State	Description
Sukey & Rachel	Great Britain	The ship was driven ashore and wrecked near Boulogne, France. Her crew were rescued. She was on a voyage from Seville, Spain to London.

=== 30 January ===
List of shipwrecks: 30 January 1773
Ship	State	Description
Port Maria	Great Britain	The ship lost her rudder and sprang a leak in the Atlantic Ocean (49°00′N 17°36′W). She was abandoned by her crew, who were rescued by Woodbridge (Great Britain). Port Maria was on a voyage from Jamaica to London.

=== Unknown date ===
List of shipwrecks: Unknown date 1773
Ship	State	Description
Agnes	Great Britain	The ship was driven ashore and wrecked between Kinsale and Cape Clear Island, County Cork, Ireland.
Amity	Great Britain	The ship ran aground in the River Ribble and was wrecked. She was on a voyage from Kings Lynn, Norfolk to Lancaster, Lancashire.
Argo	Great Britain	The ship ran aground in the River Thames at the Tower of London and broke her back. She was on a voyage from Alicante, Spain to London.
Betty	Great Britain	The ship foundered off Stromness, Orkney Islands. Her crew were rescued. She was on a voyage from Riga, Russia to Liverpool, Lancashire.
Crosbis	Great Britain	The ship was driven ashore in Glenluce Bay. She was on a voyage from Jamaica to Liverpool.
Dispatch	Great Britain	The ship foundered in the Windward Passage. She was on a voyage from Jamaica to Liverpool.
Jenny	Great Britain	The ship was driven ashore and wrecked at Porthelly, Caernarfonshire. Her crew were rescued. She was on a voyage from Saint Kitts to Liverpool.
John & Esther	Ireland	The ship foundered in the Bay of Biscay. She was on a voyage from St. Ubes, Portugal to Ireland.
Kitty	Great Britain	The ship was wrecked on Rock Point with the loss of all hands. She was on a voyage from Dominica to Liverpool.
Louisa	Dutch Republic	The ship was wrecked on the Haaks Sandbank, in the North Sea off the Dutch coast. She was on a voyage from Saint Petersburg, Russia to Amsterdam.
Mary Ann	Great Britain	The ship foundered off the east coast of Jamaica. She was on a voyage from London to Jamaica.
Surry	Great Britain	The ship was wrecked on Flores Island, Azores. She was on a voyage from the Grenades and Montserrat to London.
Tapley	Great Britain	The ship was driven ashore and wrecked on Flat Holm, in the Bristol Channel with the loss of nine lives. She was on a voyage from Cork, Ireland to Bristol, Gloucestershire.
Tom	Great Britain	The ship was wrecked on the West Hoyle Bank, in Liverpool Bay. Her crew were rescued. She was on a voyage from Saint Kitts to Liverpool.
Unity	Great Britain	The ship was driven ashore and wrecked near Boulogne, France with the loss of five of her crew. She was on a voyage from Spain to London.

== February ==
=== 1 February ===
List of shipwrecks: 1 February 1773
Ship	State	Description
Ranger	Great Britain	The ship was wrecked on The Fingers. Three of her crew were rescued. She was on a voyage from North Carolina, British America to Bristol, Gloucestershire.

=== 2 February ===
List of shipwrecks: 2 February 1773
Ship	State	Description
Dragon	Portugal	The ship was driven ashore and wrecked at Venice.

=== 7 February ===
List of shipwrecks: 7 February 1773
Ship	State	Description
Aziya (Азия, 'Asia')	Imperial Russian Navy	The ship of the line departed from Mykonos, Greece for Imbros, Ottoman Empire. Subsequently foundered after 9 February with the loss of all 439 people on board. Wreckage from the ship washed up on Mykonos.

=== 9 February ===
List of shipwrecks: 9 February 1773
Ship	State	Description
Success	Great Britain	The ship was lost near Great Yarmouth, Norfolk. She was on a voyage from Wells-next-the-Sea, Norfolk to London.

=== 18 February ===
List of shipwrecks: 18 February 1773
Ship	State	Description
Dellawar	Great Britain	The ship was lost in the Ionian Islands. She was on a voyage from Salonica, Greece to Constantinople, Ottoman Empire.
Sarah	(Kingdom of Great Britain) Guernsey	The ship departed from Guernsey for Saint Croix. No further trace, presumed foundered in the Atlantic Ocean with the loss of all hands.

=== 22 February ===
List of shipwrecks: 22 February 1773
Ship	State	Description
Sally	Great Britain	The ship foundered in the Atlantic Ocean off St. Augustine, Florida, British America. She was on a voyage from Lisbon, Portugal to South Carolina, British America.

=== 23 February ===
List of shipwrecks: 23 February 1773
Ship	State	Description
St. Michael	Great Britain	The ship was driven ashore in Dingle Bay. She was on a voyage from Liverpool, Lancashire to Cádiz, Spain.

=== 24 February ===
List of shipwrecks: 24 February 1773
Ship	State	Description
Peggy	Ireland	The ship was lost near Londonderry. She was on a voyage from Virginia, British America to London.

=== 26 February ===
List of shipwrecks: 26 February 1773
Ship	State	Description
Industry	Great Britain	The ship was in collision with another vessel in The Swin and was abandoned by her crew. She subsequently came ashore at Orford Suffolk. Industry was on a voyage from Newcastle upon Tyne, Northumberland to London.

=== Unknown date ===
List of shipwrecks: Unknown date 1773
Ship	State	Description
Carolina	Sweden	The ship was lost near Margate, Kent, Great Britain. She was on a voyage from Gothenburg to Cork, Ireland.
Catharine & Grace	Great Britain	The ship was lost near Cherburgh, France. She was on a voyage from "Saloe" to the Dutch Republic.
Deux Amie	France	The ship was driven ashore at Bridport, Dorset, Great Britain. She was on a voyage from Westerwick, Sweden to Nantes.
Dispatch	Great Britain	The ship was lost off Ouessant, France. She was on a voyage from "Guyon" to London.
Duke of Gloucester	Great Britain	The ship was driven ashore near Falmouth, Cornwall. She was on a voyage from Genoa to Hamburg.
Friendship	Great Britain	The ship was driven ashore and capsized at Montrose, Forfarshire.
Galloway	Great Britain	The ship was driven ashore and wrecked near Boulogne, France. She was on a voyage from Maryland, British America to London.
Hope	Sweden	The ship was lost near Great Yarmouth, Norfolk, Great Britain. She was on a voyage from Stockholm to London.
Phenix	Great Britain	The ship was driven ashore and severely damaged at Teignmouth, Devon. She was on a voyage from Alicante, Spain to Teignmouth.
Polly	Great Britain	The ship was lost on the French Coast. She was on a voyage from Porto Rico to London.
Polly & Nancy	Great Britain	The ship foundered in the English Channel off Portland, Dorset with the loss of all hands. She was on a voyage from Alicante to London.
Pompey	Great Britain	The ship was driven ashore and wrecked on Pembrey Sands, Carmarthenshire. She was on a voyage from Virginia, British America to London.
Queen of Naples	Great Britain	The ship was lost near Newhaven, Sussex with some loss of life. She was on a voyage from Naples, Kingdom of Sicily to London.
Salisbury	Great Britain	The ship foundered in the English Channel off Dartmouth, Devon.
Sally	Great Britain	The ship struck a sandbank in Liverpool Bay and was consequently beached near Hoylake, Lancashire. She was on a voyage from Jamaica to Liverpool, Lancashire.
Sarah and Esther	Great Britain	The ship foundered in the English Channel off Portland, Dorset Her crew were rescued. She was on a voyage from Alicante to London.
St Johannes	Sweden	The ship foundered in the English Channel off Dartmouth with some loss of life. She was on a voyage from Gothenburg to Cork.
Venus	Great Britain	The ship was lost in Dingle Bay. Her crew were rescued. She was on a voyage from Saint Kitts to Bristol, Gloucestershire.

== March ==
=== 8 March ===
List of shipwrecks: 8 March 1773
Ship	State	Description
Harmony	Great Britain	The ship was wrecked on the Holme Sands, in the North Sea off the coast of Norfolk. She was on a voyage from Newcastle upon Tyne, Northumberland to London.

=== 10 March ===
List of shipwrecks: 10 March 1773
Ship	State	Description
London	Great Britain	The ship was wrecked on a sandbank off Dublin, Ireland. She was on a voyage from London to Dublin.

=== 21 March ===
List of shipwrecks: 21 March 1773
Ship	State	Description
Cantabria Paquet	Kingdom of Sicily	The ship was lost at Camarina with the loss of all but six of her crew. She was on a voyage from Buenos Aires, Viceroyalty of Peru to Camarina.
Hibernia	Great Britain	The ship was driven ashore and wrecked at Camarina. She was on a voyage from Chester, Cheshire to Marseille, France.

=== 24 March ===
List of shipwrecks: 24 March 1773
Ship	State	Description
Fortune	Great Britain	The ship was driven ashore and wrecked in Cádiz Bay.

=== Unknown date ===
List of shipwrecks: Unknown date 1773
Ship	State	Description
Crosby	Great Britain	The ship was driven ashore and wrecked at Maryport, Cumberland.
Elenora	France	The ship was driven ashore and wrecked on the French coast with the loss of all but five of her crew. She was on a voyage from Saint Domingo to Nantes.
Jane	Great Britain	The ship was driven ashore and wrecked at "Balsee Cliff". She was on a voyage from Newcastle upon Tyne, Northumberland to London.
Pearl	Great Britain	The ship was lost in Loch Ryan. She was on a voyage from Londonderry, Ireland to London.

== April ==
=== 1 April ===
List of shipwrecks: 1 April 1773
Ship	State	Description
Peggy	Great Britain	The ship foundered in the North Sea off the coast of Flanders, Dutch Republic. Her crew were rescued. She was on a voyage from Newcastle upon Tyne, Northumberland to Bordeaux, France.

=== 7 April ===
List of shipwrecks: 7 April 1773
Ship	State	Description
Industry	Great Britain	The ship was driven ashore and wrecked a league (3 nautical miles (5.6 km)) east of the Mew Stone, Devon. Her crew were rescued. She was on a voyage from Waterford, Ireland to London.

=== 14 April ===
List of shipwrecks: 14 April 1773
Ship	State	Description
Royal Charlotte	Ireland	The ship was destroyed by fire at Dublin.

=== Unknown date ===
List of shipwrecks: Unknown date 1773
Ship	State	Description
Eagle	Ireland	The ship was driven ashore near Drumroe, County Waterford. She was on a voyage from Waterford to Newfoundland, British America.
Lyon	Ireland	The ship was driven ashore at Drumroe. She was on a voyage from Waterford to Newfoundland.
Thetis	Spain	The ship was wrecked on Chinchon Point. She was on a voyage from Carthagena, Viceroyalty of New Granada to Cádiz.
Venus	Ireland	The ship was driven ashore at Drumroe. She was on a voyage from Waterford to Newfoundland.

== May ==
=== 4 May ===
List of shipwrecks: 4 May 1773
Ship	State	Description
Patriothen	Sweden	The ship was wrecked on rocks at Niddingen, near Gothenburg, with some loss of life. She was on a voyage from Stockholm to Dublin, Ireland.

=== 10 May ===
List of shipwrecks: 10 May 1773
Ship	State	Description
Industry	Great Britain	The ship was wrecked on the Northern Triangles. Her crew survived. She was on a voyage from British Honduras to New York, British America.

=== 11 May ===
List of shipwrecks: 11 May 1773
Ship	State	Description
King George	Great Britain	The ship was driven ashore at Brancaster, Norfolk. She was on a voyage from King's Lynn, Norfolk to London.

=== 16 May ===
List of shipwrecks: 16 May 1773
Ship	State	Description
Thomas	Great Britain	The ship was lost off the east of Jamaica. Her crew were rescued. She was on a voyage from London to Jamaica.

=== 29 May ===
List of shipwrecks: 29 May 1773
Ship	State	Description
Elizabeth	Great Britain	The ship foundered in the English Channel. She was on a voyage from Guernsey, Channel Islands to London.

=== Unknown date ===
List of shipwrecks: Unknown date 1773
Ship	State	Description
Felicity	France	The ship foundered in the Atlantic Ocean off the Isles of Scilly, Great Britain. Eleven crew were rescued. She was on a voyage from Saint Domingo to Havre de Grâce.
Maria	Great Britain	The ship was driven ashore at Domesnes, Norway.
Peggy	Great Britain	The ship foundered with the loss of all hands. She was on a voyage from the Clyde to France.
Restoration	Great Britain	The ship was losy at Beaumaris, Anglesey. She was on a voyage from the Isle of Skye to Liverpool, Lancashire.
Unity	Ireland	The ship foundered off the Banks of Wicklow, in the Irish Sea. She was on a voyage from Rotterdam, Dutch Republic to Dublin.

== June ==
=== 1 June ===
List of shipwrecks: 1 June 1773
Ship	State	Description
Jonge Thomas	Dutch East India Company	Jonge Thomas. The East Indiaman, a frigate, was driven ashore and wrecked in Tafelbaai, Dutch Cape Colony with the loss of 140 of the 193 people on board.

=== Unknown date ===
List of shipwrecks: Unknown date 1773
Ship	State	Description
Conway	Great Britain	The ship was driven ashore on The Needles, Isle of Wight. She was on a voyage from London to Jamaica. Conway was refloated on 9 June.
William & Ann	Great Britain	The ship sank in the River Thames at Deptford, Kent.

== July ==
=== Unknown date ===
List of shipwrecks: Unknown date 1773
Ship	State	Description
Lord Monnt Cashell	Great Britain	The ship was driven ashore and wrecked on Saint Croix.

== August ==
=== 13 August ===
List of shipwrecks: 13 August 1773
Ship	State	Description
Providence	Great Britain	The ship foundered in the Mediterranean Sea off Málaga, Spain. Her crew were rescued. She was on a voyage from Chester, Cheshire to Livorno, Grand Duchy of Tuscany.

=== 18 August ===
List of shipwrecks: 18 August 1773
Ship	State	Description
St Antonio	Portugal	The ship was wrecked on a rock off Alderney, Channel Islands. She was on a voyage from Amsterdam, Dutch Republic to Porto.

=== 28 August ===
List of shipwrecks: 28 August 1773
Ship	State	Description
David & Ann	Great Britain	The ship departed from Leith, Lothian for Cape Fear, North Carolina, British America. No further trace, presumed foundered with the loss of all hands.

=== Unknown date ===
List of shipwrecks: Unknown date 1773
Ship	State	Description
Mercury	Great Britain	The ship was driven ashore on the coast of France and severely damaged. She was subsequently refloated.
Rosalie Victoire	France	The ship was driven ashore and wrecked near Feccamp. She was on a voyage from London, Great Britain to Rouen.
Two Sisters	Great Britain	The ship departed from Alicante, Spain for Newfoundland, British America during August. No further trace, presumed foundered in the Atlantic Ocean with the loss of all hands.

== September ==
=== 2 September ===
List of shipwrecks: 2 September 1773
Ship	State	Description
Salvaterra	Portugal	The ship was wrecked at the mouth of the River Shannon, Ireland with the loss of all hands.

=== 7 September ===
List of shipwrecks: 7 September 1773
Ship	State	Description
Lord Mansfield	British East India Company	The East Indiaman was lost in the Bengal River.

=== 8 September ===
List of shipwrecks: 8 September 1773
Ship	State	Description
Eight Friends	Great Britain	The ship foundered in The Wash off King's Lynn, Norfolk.

=== 11 September ===
List of shipwrecks: 11 September 1773
Ship	State	Description
Nelly	Great Britain	The ship was driven ashore and wrecked near Maryport, Cumberland. She was on a voyage from Riga, Russian Empire to Carlisle, Cumberland.

=== 14 September ===
List of shipwrecks: 14 September 1773
Ship	State	Description
Strelna (Стрельна)	Imperial Russian Navy	The galiot was wrecked off Sommers in the Gulf of Finland with the loss of one of the twenty people on board.

=== 15 September ===
List of shipwrecks: 15 September 1773
Ship	State	Description
Fate	Great Britain	The ship was destroyed by an onboard explosion.

=== 20 September ===
List of shipwrecks: 20 September 1773
Ship	State	Description
Mermaid	Great Britain	The ship sank in the Sheep-Cut River, Maine, British America.

=== 22 September ===
List of shipwrecks: 22 September 1773
Ship	State	Description
Duke of Cumberland	Great Britain	The ship was lost in the Isles of Scilly. She was on a voyage from New England, British America to London.

=== 23 September ===
List of shipwrecks: 23 September 1773
Ship	State	Description
Norman	Great Britain	The ship was wrecked on the Haisborough Sands, in the North Sea off the coast of Norfolk. Her crew survived. She was on a voyage from South Shields, County Durham to London.

=== Unknown date ===
List of shipwrecks: Unknown date 1773
Ship	State	Description
Edward	Great Britain	The ship foundered in the Irish Sea off Holyhead, Anglesey. She was on a voyage from South Carolina, British America to Liverpool, Lancashire.
Henry Carl	flag unknown	The ship departed from "Drunton" for Belfast, County Antrim, Kingdom of Ireland. No further trace, presumed foundered with the loss of all hands.
Jacobus	Stettin	The ship was wrecked on the coast of Norway. She was on a voyage from Stettin to Chatham, Kent, Great Britain.
Jenny	Great Britain	The ship ran aground off the Isle of Whithorn, Wigtownshire and was wrecked. She was on a voyage from Saint Petersburg, Russia to Kirkcudbright.
Liberty	Ireland	The ship departed from "Reney", Newfoundland, British America for Waterford. No further trace, presumed foundered in the Atlantic Ocean with the loss of all hands.
St Jean Baptista	Spain	The ship was driven ashore and wrecked on the coast of Normandy, France. She was on a voyage from Dunkirk, France to Bilbao.
Vulture	Great Britain	The ship struck a rock in the River Mersey and was severely damaged. She was on a voyage from Africa to the Grenades and Liverpool, Lancashire.
Will	Great Britain	The ship foundered in the Irish Sea off Holyhead. She was on a voyage from Jamaica to Liverpool.

== October ==
=== 4 October ===
List of shipwrecks: 4 October 1773
Ship	State	Description
Mary	Great Britain	The ship was driven ashore and wrecked at Brighthelmstone, Sussex.

=== 8 October ===
List of shipwrecks: 8 October 1773
Ship	State	Description
John & Mary	Great Britain	The ship ran aground on rocks off St Martin's, Isles of Scilly and was damaged. She was refloated and taken in to St Mary's.

=== 10 October ===
List of shipwrecks: 10 October 1773
Ship	State	Description
Anthony	Ireland	The ship was wrecked on the North Bull, in the Irish Sea off Dublin. She was on a voyage from Dublin to Cádiz, Spain.

=== 12 October ===
List of shipwrecks: 12 October 1773
Ship	State	Description
Matilda	Great Britain	The ship struck rocks in the Saint Lawrence River. She sank on 18 October. She was on a voyage from Philadelphia, Pennsylvania to Quebec, British America.

=== 27 October ===
List of shipwrecks: 27 October 1773
Ship	State	Description
Lovely Cruizer	Great Britain	The coaster struck the anchor of an East Indiaman and sank in the River Thames.

=== 29 October ===
List of shipwrecks: 29 October 1773
Ship	State	Description
Betsey	Great Britain	The ship was driven onto rocks at Derbyhaven, Isle of Man and was wrecked with the loss of five of her crew. She was on a voyage from Lancaster, Lancashire to Cork, Ireland and Jamaica.

=== 30 October ===
List of shipwrecks: 30 October 1773
Ship	State	Description
Alyda	Bremen	The ship was wrecked on the Goodwin Sands, Kent, Great Britain. Her crew were rescued. She was on a voyage from Bremen to Cádiz, Spain.
Neptune	Ireland	The ship foundered in the Atlantic Ocean off Faro, Portugal. She was on a voyage from Saint Petersburg, Russia to Londonderry.
Peggy	Great Britain	The ship was driven ashore and sank at Great Yarmouth, Norfolk.

=== Unknown date ===
List of shipwrecks: Unknown date 1773
Ship	State	Description
Etherington	Great Britain	The ship foundered in the Gulf of Finland off Narva, Russia. She was on a voyage from Saint Petersburg, Russia to Narva and Hull, Yorkshire.
Good Intent	Ireland	The ship was driven ashore and wrecked near Wexford between 25 and 31 October with the loss of a crew member.
Hannah	Great Britain	The ship foundered in the Gulf of Finland off Dagö, Russia. She was on a voyage from Saint Petersburg to Liverpool, Lancashire.
John & Thomas	Great Britain	The ship foundered in the Atlantic Ocean off Cape Clear Island, County Cork, Ireland. She was on a voyage from Antigua to Liverpool.
Jonge Frederick	flag unknown	The ship foundered in the North Sea off Texel, Dutch Republic.
L'Heureux Clairon	France	The ship was destroyed by fire in the Mediterranean Sea. She was on a voyage from Marseille to Cádiz, Spain.
Mary	Great Britain	The ship foundered. She was on a voyage from Liverpool to Ostend, Dutch Republic.
Potomac	Great Britain	The ship was driven ashore near Boulogne, France with the loss of eight of her crew. She was on a voyage from Maryland, British America to London.
St Pierre	Great Britain	The ship was burnt in the Loire. A deliberate act by her captain.
Trial	Great Britain	The ship foundered in the Baltic Sea.

== November ==
=== 6 November ===
List of shipwrecks: 6 November 1773
Ship	State	Description
Temernik (Темерник)	Imperial Russian Navy	The ship was driven ashore at Kertch. She was refloated.

=== 11 November ===
List of shipwrecks: 11 November 1773
Ship	State	Description
Fortune	Great Britain	The ship was driven ashore in the Bay of Dundalk. She was on a voyage from Glasgow, Renfrewshire to Dublin, Ireland.
Rose	Great Britain	The ship ran aground on the Break Sand, in the North Sea. She was on a voyage from London to Jamaica.

=== 12 November ===
List of shipwrecks: 12 November 1773
Ship	State	Description
Diligent	France	The ship was driven ashore at Hythe, Kent, Great Britain She was on a voyage from Marseille to Rouen.

=== 15 November ===
List of shipwrecks: 15 November 1773
Ship	State	Description
Charming Nancy	Great Britain	The ship was driven ashore and wrecked at Stratton, Cornwall. She was on a voyage from Nova Scotia, British America to London.

=== 16 November ===
List of shipwrecks: 16 November 1773
Ship	State	Description
Squirrel	Ireland	The ship foundered in the Atlantic Ocean off St Martin's, Isles of Scilly, Great Britain. Her crew were rescued. She was on a voyage from Lisbon, Portugal to Dublin.

=== 17 November ===
List of shipwrecks: 17 November 1773
Ship	State	Description
Nelly	Great Britain	The ship was driven ashore and severely damaged at Ostend, Dutch Republic. She was later refloated and taken in to Ostend. Nelly was on a voyage from Hamburg to Marseille, France.

=== 18 November ===
List of shipwrecks: 18 November 1773
Ship	State	Description
Dove	Great Britain	African slave trade: The ship was driven ashore on the coast of Florida, British America with the loss of three of her crew and 80 of her 100 slaves. She was on a voyage from Africa to Saint Augustine, Florida.
Sally	(Kingdom of Great Britain) British America	The ship departed from Canso, Nova Scotia for Bilbao, Spain. No further trace, presumed foundered in the Atlantic Ocean with the loss of all hands.

=== 24 November ===
List of shipwrecks: 24 November 1773
Ship	State	Description
Pearl	Great Britain	The ship was driven ashore and wrecked on Bornholm, Denmark. She was on a voyage from Saint Petersburg, Russia to London.

=== Unknown date ===
List of shipwrecks: Unknown date 1773
Ship	State	Description
Blessing	Great Britain	The ship was wrecked on the Sandwich Flats, Kent.
Bridlington	Great Britain	The ship foundered in the Baltic Sea.
Diana	Great Britain	The ship was driven ashore near Rye, Sussex. She was on a voyage from "Musquita Shore" to London.
Friends Adventure	Great Britain	The ship was driven ashore and wrecked near Calais, France. Her crew were rescued. She was on a voyage from Great Yarmouth, Norfolk to Venice.
Happy Return	Ireland	The ship was wrecked on the North Bull, in the Irish Sea off Dublin.
Jan Cornelis Holm	Dutch Republic	The ship was driven ashore and wrecked near Blankenberge. She was on a voyage from "Turo" to Ostend.
Mary & Sally	Ireland	The ship was driven ashore near Wexford. She was on a voyage from Málaga, Spain to Dublin.
Mayflower	Great Britain	The ship was lost near Ventava, Duchy of Courland and Semigallia. She was on a voyage from King's Lynn to Riga, Russia.
Nossa Senhora do Porto	Portugal	The ship departed from Rio de Janeiro, Brazil for Porto. No further trace, presumed foundered in the Atlantic Ocean with the loss of all hands.
Santa Ritta	Portugal	The ship departed from Rio de Janeiro for Porto. No further trace, presumed foundered in the Atlantic Ocean with the loss of all hands.
Neptune	Great Britain	The ship was driven ashore and wrecked at Winterton-on-Sea, Norfolk. She was on a voyage from Hamburg to Bergen, Norway and Venice.
Phenix	Dutch Republic	The ship sprang a leak in the English Channel. She was taken in to Padstow, Cornwall but sank in the River Camel.
Providence	Great Britain	The ship struck a sandbank off Great Yarmouth and sank. She was on a voyage from Saint Petersburg to Bristol, Gloucestershire.
Sandwich Paquet	Great Britain	The ship foundered in the English Channel off Jersey, Channel Islands. Her crew were rescued. She was on a voyage from Charles Town, South Carolina, British America to Falmouth, Cornwall.
Shelborn and Triton	Both Great Britain	The ships were in collision with Kingston (Great Britain) in The Downs and foundered. Kingston was consequently beached at Ramsgate, Kent.
Southampton	Great Britain	The ship foundered in the Baltic Sea 5 leagues (15 nautical miles (28 km) off Memel, Prussia. Her crew were rescued. She was on a voyage from Hull, Yorkshire to Memel.
Tom	Great Britain	The ship was driven ashore and wrecked in the Orkney Islands. She was on a voyage from Bremen to Liverpool. She was refloated in October 1774 and taken in to Liverpool.
Voorsigtigheyd	Hamburg	The ship was driven ashore 11 nautical miles (20 km) from Trondheim, Norway. She was on a voyage from Arkhangelsk, Russia to Hamburg.

== December ==
=== 8 December ===
List of shipwrecks: 8 December 1773
Ship	State	Description
Nostra Señora del Chorto	Spain	The ship was wrecked near Cape Laogue. She was on a voyage from Rouen, France to St. Andero.

=== 9 December ===
List of shipwrecks: 9 December 1773
Ship	State	Description
Thomas	Great Britain	The ship foundered off Margate, Kent. She was on a voyage from Rotterdam, Dutch Republic to Cork, Kingdom of Ireland.

=== 17 December ===
List of shipwrecks: 17 December 1773
Ship	State	Description
Industry	(Kingdom of Great Britain) British America	The sloop foundered whilst on a voyage from Baltimore, Maryland to North Carolina.
Royal Captain	British East India Company	The East Indiaman, a full-rigged ship, struck a reef in the South China Sea off Palawan, Spanish East Indies and was wrecked with the loss of three of her crew. She was on a voyage from Whampoa, China to Balambangan Island, Borneo.

=== 19 December ===
List of shipwrecks: 19 December 1773
Ship	State	Description
Charming Nancy	(Kingdom of Great Britain) British America	The ship (a.k.a. Grand Rivière) was lost 3 leagues (9 nautical miles (17 km) west of St. Lucar, Spain.

=== 26 December ===
List of shipwrecks: 26 December 1773
Ship	State	Description
Polly	Great Britain	The ship foundered in the Atlantic Ocean. Her crew were rescued. She was on a voyage from Georgia, British America to Jamaica.

=== Unknown date ===
List of shipwrecks: Unknown date 1773
Ship	State	Description
Ann & Sarah	Great Britain	The ship was wrecked on the coast of Norfolk. Her crew were rescued.
Bee	Ireland	The ship was lost near Ferrol, Spain. She was on a voyage from Waterford to Cádiz, Spain.
Chichester	Great Britain	The ship struck the Burbo Rock, in Liverpool Bay and was lost. She was on a voyage from Liverpool, Lancashire to Dublin, Ireland.
Aston	Great Britain	The ship was lost near Wexford, Ireland. She was on a voyage from Africa to Liverpool.
George & Molly	Great Britain	The ship struck rocks 4 leagues from Trondheim, Norway and was wrecked. Her crew were rescued. She was on a voyage from Plymouth, Devon to Trondheim.
Good Hope	Great Britain	The ship was driven onto rocks at Dysart, Fife and wrecked.
Nancy	Great Britain	The ship was driven ashore on the Scottish coast. She was on a voyage from "Pilafoundrey" to Hull, Yorkshire.
Susanna	Great Britain	The ship was wrecked on one of the Shetland Islands. She was on a voyage from Boston, Massachusetts and Goldsboro, Pennsylvania, British America to London.

== Unknown date ==
List of shipwrecks: Unknown date 1773
Ship	State	Description
Ann	(Kingdom of Great Britain) Grenada	The drogher sloop was lost off Grenada.
Britannia	Great Britain	The ship foundered in the Atlantic Ocean. She was on a voyage from Maryland, British America to Newry, County Antrim, Ireland.
Britannia	Great Britain	The transport ship was destroyed by fire at Boston, Massachusetts, British America.
Charlotte	Great Britain	The ship foundered off Saint Kitts. She was on a voyage from London to the Leeward Islands.
Charming Betsey	Great Britain	The ship was lost on the coast of North Carolina, British America before 5 July.
Dalrymple	Great Britain	The ship was lost on the Isle of May. Her crew were rescued by Eleanor (Great Britain). Dalrymple was on a voyage from Liverpool, Lancashire to Africa.
Dunbar	Great Britain	The whaler was sunk by ice off the coast of Greenland.
East-Florida Merchant	Great Britain	The ship was lost at Saint Augustine, Florida, British America. She was on a voyage from London to Saint Augustine.
Elizabeth	Great Britain	The ship was lost near New Calabar. Her crew were rescued. She was on a voyage from Bristol, Gloucestershire to Africa.
Endeavour	Great Britain	The ship foundered in the Atlantic Ocean. Her crew were rescued. She was on a voyage from Pool, Dorset to Newfoundland, British America.
Friendship	Great Britain	The transport ship foundered in the Atlantic Ocean. Her crew were rescued. She was on a voyage from New York, British America to London.
George	Great Britain	The ship was wrecked on the Colorados. She was on a voyage from Jamaica to London.
George & Edward	Great Britain	The ship was lost at "Fermose", Newfoundland.
Herbert	(Kingdom of Great Britain) British America	The ship foundered in the Atlantic Ocean (38°04′N 58°00′W). Her crew were rescued by Betty (Great Britain). Herbert was on a voyage from the Piscataqua River to Antigua.
Hill	Great Britain	The ship was lost at Barbados.
Hope	Ireland	The ship was driven ashore at New York. She was on a voyage from Dublin to New York.
Hope	Great Britain	The whaler was sunk by ice off the coast of Greenland.
Hope	Great Britain	The ship was lost on Candia. Her crew were rescued.
Industry	Great Britain	African slave trade: The ship was taken over by the slaves on board, who killed all but two of the crew. She was run ashore on the coast of Sierra Leone and wrecked. Industry was on a voyage from Gambia to the West Indies.
Infante	Spain	The ship was wrecked on Little Cayman. Her crew were rescued. She was on a voyage from Bilbao to Havana, Captaincy General of Cuba.
Jenny	Great Britain	The whaler was sunk by ice off the coast of Greenland.
John	Great Britain	The ship was lost on the Bahama Banks. She was on a voyage from Jamaica to Bristol.
King George	Great Britain	African slave trade: The ship was driven ashore and wrecked at New Calabar. Her crew and 30 slaves were rescued.
Kingston	Great Britain	The ship was lost in the Westward Passage. She was on a voyage from South Carolina to Jamaica.
Kitty	(Kingdom of Great Britain) British America	The ship foundered in the Atlantic Ocean with the loss of all but two of her crew. She was on a voyage from Boston, Massachusetts to Newfoundland.
Lord Mansfield	Great Britain	The ship was lost in the Bengal River. Her crew were rescued.
Maria	Great Britain	The ship was lost in the Bay of Honduras. Her crew were rescued.
Mary	Great Britain	The ship was wrecked on the Isle of Pines, Cuba. At least eight of her crew survived. She was on a voyage from Jamaica to Liverpool.
Mecklenburgh	(Kingdom of Great Britain) Admiralty	The cutter was sunk as part of a breakwater at Sheerness, Kent
Natty	Great Britain	The ship was lost near Bay Bulls, Newfoundland. Her crew were rescued. She was on a voyage from Pool to Newfoundland.
Nester	Great Britain	The ship was lost near Antigua. She was on a voyage from New England, British America to the Leeward Islands.
Palliser	Great Britain	The ship was lost at New Providence, New Jersey, British America.
Peggy	Great Britain	The ship foundered in the Atlantic Ocean. She was on a voyage from New York, British America to Belfast, County Antrim.
Rio Tamego	Portugal	The ship was lost off Cape St Roque, Brazil. She was on a voyage from Porto to Rio de Janeiro, Brazil.
Royal Captain	British East India Company	The East Indiaman was lost in Chinese waters with the loss of three of her crew.
Royal Exchange	Great Britain	The whaler was sunk by ice off the coast of Greenland.
Sophia	Great Britain	The ship foundered in the Atlantic Ocean off Sable Island, Nova Scotia, British America. She was on a voyage from Philadelphia, Pennsylvania, to Quebec, British America.
Speedwell	Great Britain	The ship was sunk by ice. Her crew were rescued.
Springfield	Great Britain	The whaler was sunk by ice off the coast of Greenland.
Steady	Great Britain	The whaler foundered off the coast of Greenland.
St Joseph	Spain	The ship was lost at Carthagena, Viceroyalty of Peru. She was on a voyage from Cádiz to Carthagena.
St Paul	France	The ship was lost on Ratan Island. She was on a voyage from Montserrat to the Bay of Honduras.
Susannah	Great Britain	The ship foundered in the Gulf of Florida. She was on a voyage from Jamaica to Georgia, British America.
Tom	Great Britain	The ship was lost near Cape Mount, Africa. She was on a voyage from Liverpool to Africa.
Townside	Great Britain	The ship was lost near Cape Mount. She was on a voyage from Liverpool to Africa.
William	Great Britain	The ship was lost near Anguilla.
William	Great Britain	The ship foundered in the Atlantic Ocean off Cape Cod, Massachusetts. She was on a voyage from London to Boston, Massachusetts.
William and Catharine	Ireland	The ship foundered in the Atlantic Ocean. She was on a voyage from the Grenades to Dublin.
