= Felix Doran (slave trader) =

Irish slave trader

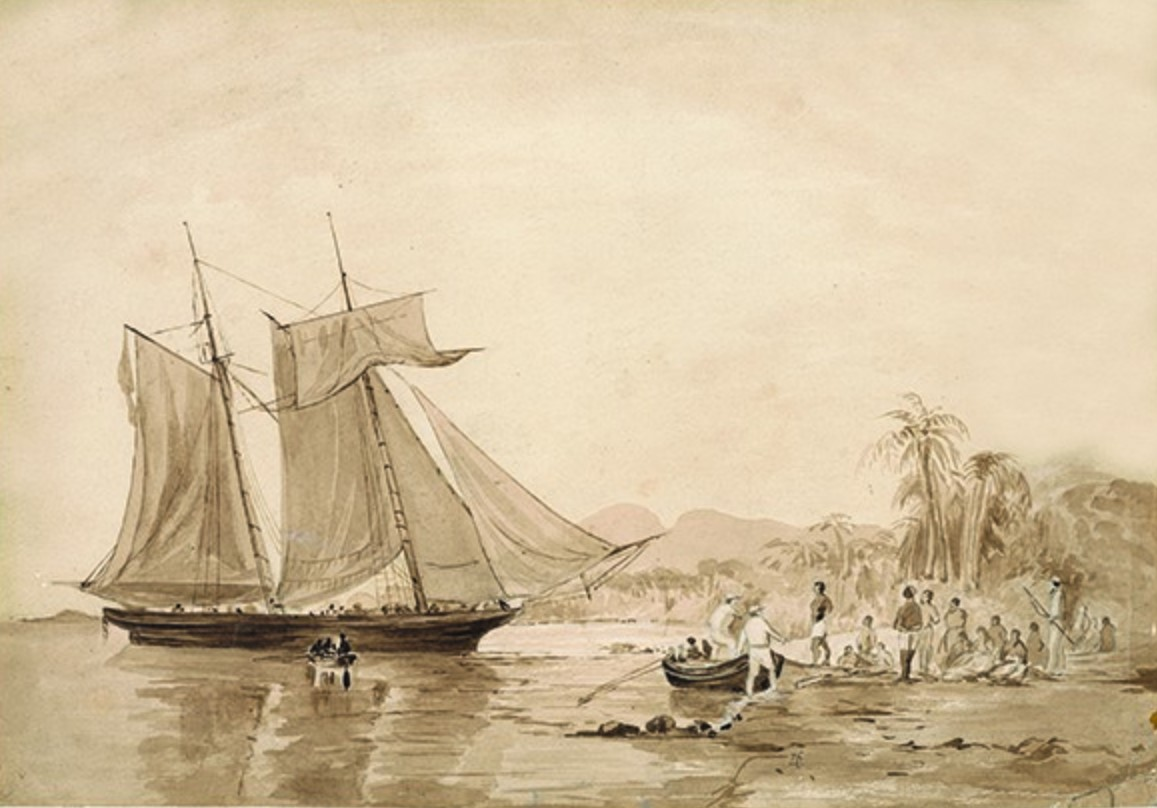
Drawing of slave traders collecting enslaved people off the coast of Africa

Felix Doran (1708–1776) was an Irish slave trader. He was responsible for at least 69 slave voyages. Doran moved to Liverpool in the 1740s and operated out of the Port of Liverpool. His first slave-ship was called Lively and his final one was called Essex.

== Early life ==
Doran was born in Ireland, baptised and brought up as a Catholic. He may have been born in County Down, where the surname Doran was common.

== Slave trade ==
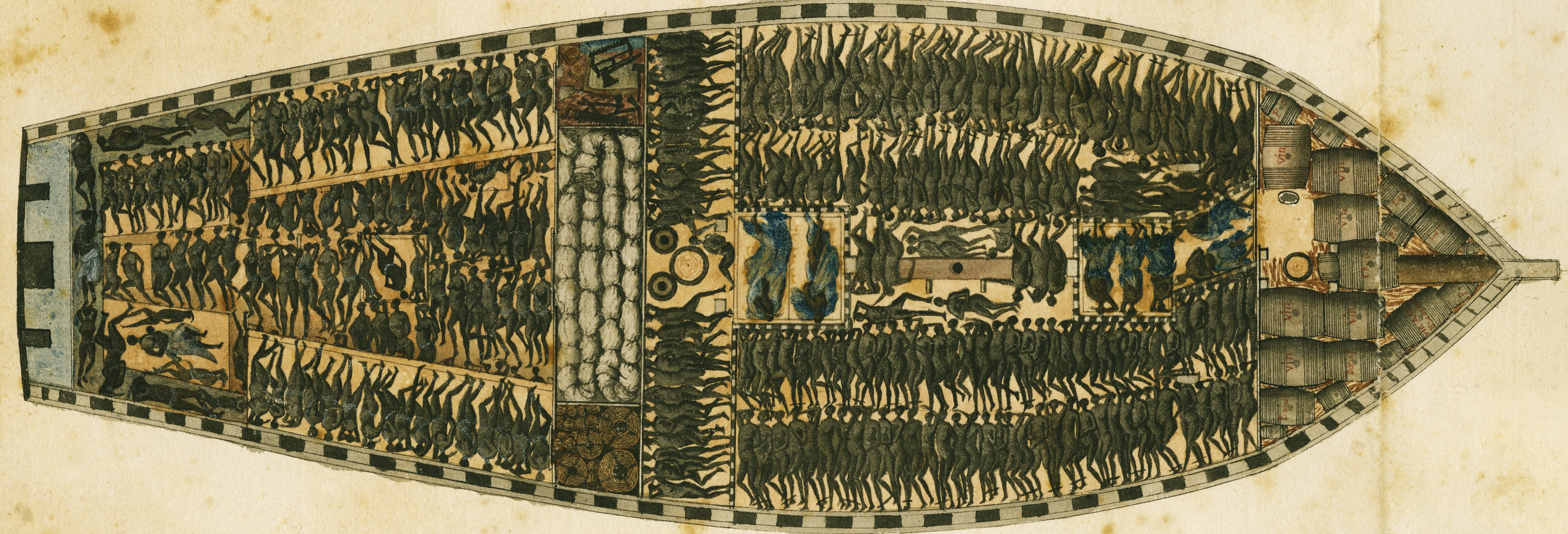
The slave deck of a slave ship, showing shackled Africans

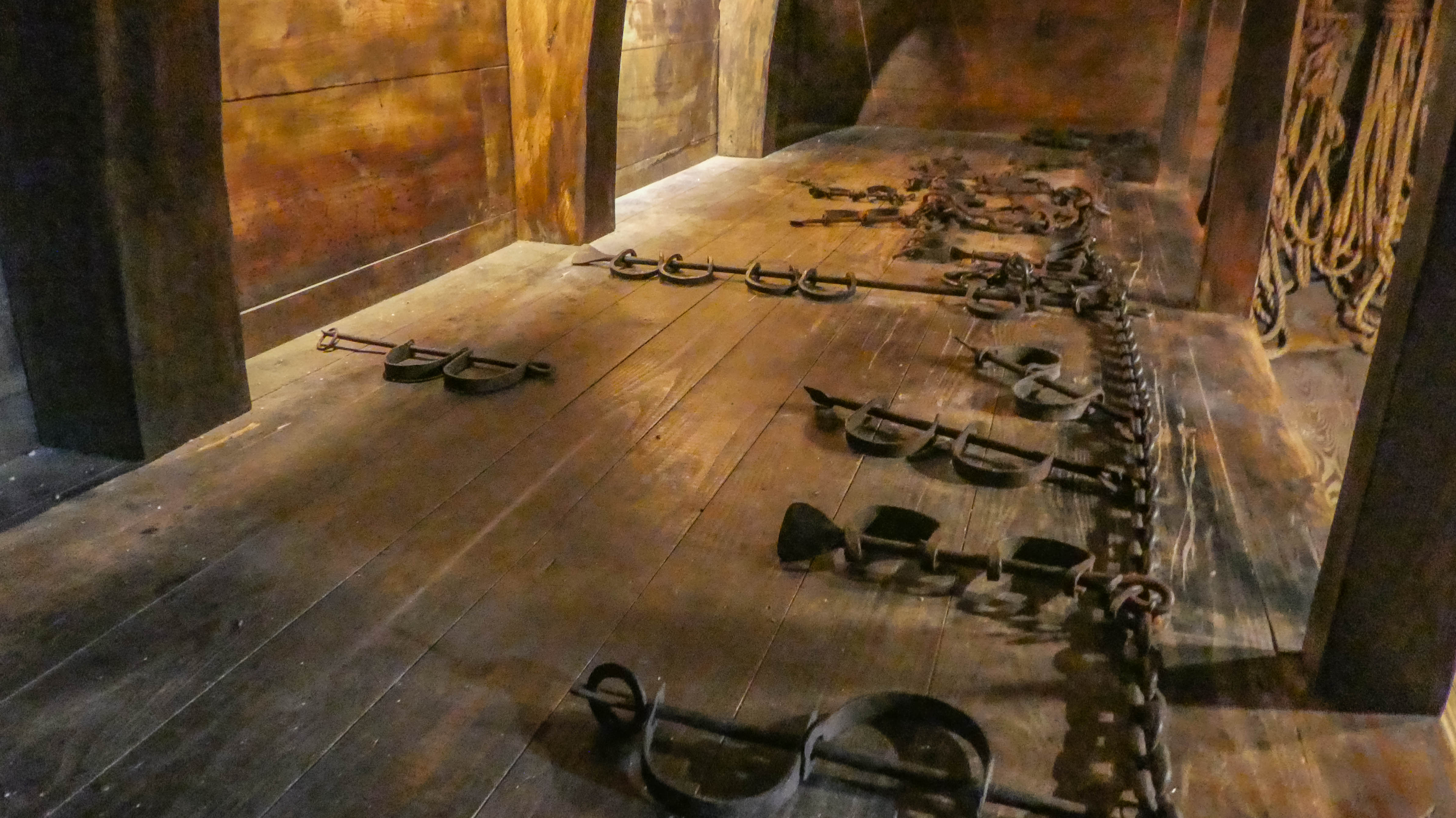
Slave shackles

Doran moved to Liverpool in the late 1740s, from the Port of Liverpool he completed at least 69 slave voyages. His first recorded slave voyage was with the slave ship Lively in 1737. The captain, Brooke Richmond, bought captive people from Africa and sold them in the West Indies. Thereafter Patrick Dwyer was the captain of Lively for 5 more slave voyages. On these voyages Doran took enslaved people from Africa and sold them in Barbados. Doran also owned the slave ships Hazard, Pearl, Vestal, Forde, Kildare and Molly, amongst others.

Doran was a partner in the firm of Knight, Doran & Co. with the slave trader John Knight. Together they leased the New Glasshouse on Liverpool's South Dock from the Corporation of Liverpool.

Two ships, one called Judith and the other Lively, are recorded as having plantation certificates in the name Felix Doran.

Doran's final slave voyage was with the ship Essex in 1776. The ship was constructed in Liverpool in 1770 and was carrying four cannons. The ship was captained by Ralph Abraham and picked up captives at Bassa and they were sold in Antigua. Of the 359 enslaved people that started the journey across the Atlantic Ocean, 31 died on board. Doran himself died in 1776, before Essex disembarked its captives.

== Personal life ==
Doran was baptised and brought up as a Catholic, but later married a non-Catholic, Mary Foxcroft. She was the niece of one of Doran's slave trading partners, Thomas Foxcroft.

His son, also called Felix Doran (1758–1827), was a slave trader. Felix Doran Jr was responsible for 21 slave voyages, also from the Port of Liverpool.

== Death ==
In his will Doran left £200 to his sister in Dublin, and a further £500 to her should his son Felix Jr die before the age of 21. He was buried at St Nicholas's Church, Liverpool.

== Legacy ==
From 1780 Liverpool was the single biggest slave port in the Atlantic world. Numerous streets and localities in Liverpool are named after slave traders. Felix Doran has Dorans Lane named after him, although he lived on nearby Lord Street. Piers Dudgeon writes that Doran "seems to cling ghost-like to the area".

== Sources ==
- Richardson, David (2007). Liverpool and Transatlantic Slavery. UK: Liverpool University Press. ISBN 978-1-84631-066-9.
