= Windward Coast =

European historical term for an area of West Africa

- Windward Coast location in red
- Status: Modern day Liberia, and Côte d'Ivoire
- Demonym: Windwarders
- Time zone: UTC+0 (GMT)
  - Summer (DST): UTC+0 (GMT)

The Windward Coast is an area of West Africa located on the coast between Cape Mount and Assini, i.e. the coastlines of the modern states of Sierra Leone, Liberia and Ivory Coast, to the west of the Gold Coast. A related region is the Pepper Coast. It is called the Windward Coast because it was a place where European sailors met the Atlantic trade winds head-on, or the direction from which the wind is blowing.

== Culture ==
The Windwarders were renowned for their rice and indigo cultivation.
