= Bouche du Roy (disambiguation) =

Bouche du Roy may refer to:

- Bouche du Roy, an estuary in Benin
- Community Biodiversity Conservation Area of La Bouche du Roy, a protected area in Benin
- La Bouche du Roi (artwork), an art piece by Beninese artist Romuald Hazoumè
