= Plan of the British Slave Ship Brooks, 1788 =

1788 British slave ship drawing

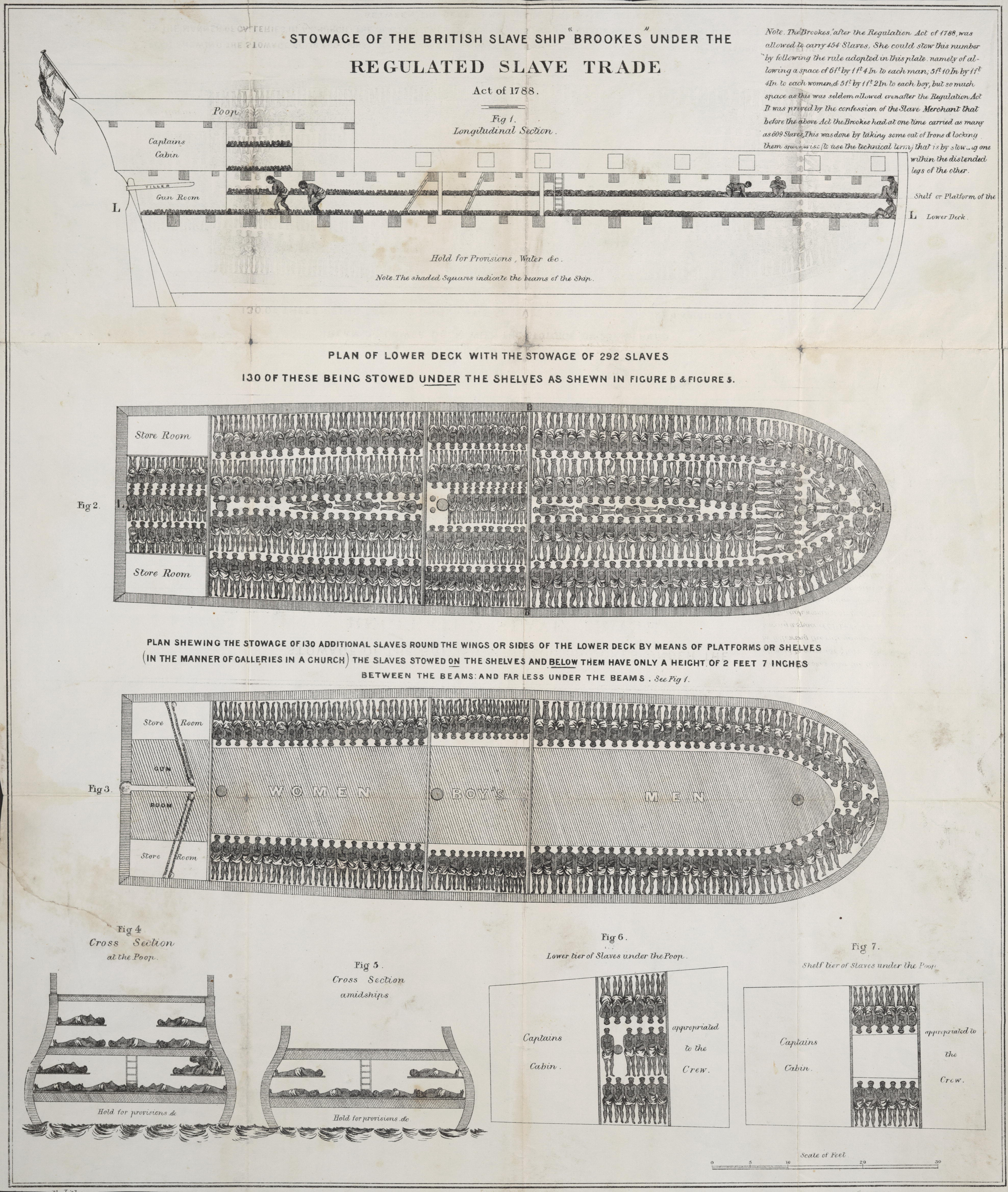
- Artist: William Elford
- Completion date: 1788

Plan of the British Slave Ship Brooks, 1788, is a detailed drawing of the British slave ship Brooks (or Brookes), rendered by Sir William Elford in 1788, then widely republished in 1789. Because of its graphic portrayal of the human cargo hold of a slave ship, it was an oft-reproduced image used as a means of forwarding the abolitionist cause, and one of the most iconic images illustrating the inhumanity of the slave trade.

== Ship history ==
The ship Brooks was built in 1781 in Liverpool and operated until 1804 as a slaver. It was first registered by Lloyd's as the Brook and then the Brooks, owned by Joseph Brooks Jr., and in some documents mistakenly referred to as the Brookes. Ownership changed hands at least twice after that. In 1794 it was listed as a ship of 319 tons burthen, length 98 feet, beam 27 feet, and carrying 12 9-pound guns. The ship's complement varied, from a crew of 58 in its earliest years of service, to as low as 36 in some later voyages.

Between 1782 and 1804 the ship made 10 voyages in which slaves were transported, and an eleventh trip which was aborted. Sailing from Liverpool, the ship acquired captives in the west of Africa, delivered them on its "Middle Passage" to locations in the western hemisphere, most commonly islands in the Caribbean, then finally returning to England. Each voyage lasted anywhere from 6 to 12 months, with the transit time with human cargo from Africa to the Caribbean between 50 and 60 days.

On its first four voyages, from 1782 to 1787, the ship carried more than 600 slaves on each voyage, the maximum being 740 in 1785. In 1788 the Parliament of Great Britain passed the Slave Trade Act 1788, which restricted the number of slaves which could be transported in accordance with the ship's tonnage, mandated that slave ships have a doctor on board, and provided financial incentives for limiting slave mortality. In the ship's final six voyages, approximately 400 slaves were transported on each journey. On the ship's 1785 voyage with 740 slaves, 105 of them died (14%). On the ship's final voyage in 1804, 322 slaves were transported and only 2 died (< 1%). In every voyage some crew members also died, ranging from 1 or 2, to in one voyage in 1801, 11 of 45 crew members dying.

== Background of the drawing ==
During the 18th century, Britain was the world's largest slave-trading nation, in all approximately 2.5 million slaves were transported on British ships. Despite this, the mid 1780s anti-slavery sentiment in Britain developed into a prominent movement. The abolitionists Thomas Clarkson and Sir William Dolben, a Member of Parliament, were instrumental in getting a plan of the Brooks, with the dimensions and layout of its decks. In 1788 Dolben introduced the Slave Trade Act of 1788 to Parliament, which was passed. In late 1788, the first drawing of the ship with slaves shown was produced as a broadside in Plymouth by Sir William Elford and the Society for Effecting the Abolition of the Slave Trade. The drawing was also published as a broadside in Bristol in 1789. It was subsequently copied and modified several times, using both copper engraving and woodcut as a printing technique. A version that was widely copied was published by a Quaker printer, James Phillips, and distributed to Members of Parliament and others in April 1789. In the United States a version was first published in 1789 in Mathew Carey's magazine The American Museum. Another copy was published by Clarkson, in support of an effort by William Wilberforce, MP to pass a bill to abolish slavery entirely in 1791, which failed. In 1807 the Slave Trade Act was passed, which banned British involvement with the Atlantic slave trade. In 1833, slavery itself was finally abolished in the British Empire.

== Depiction ==
The image as drawn by William Elford is entitled "Stowage of the British Slave Trade "Brookes" Under the Regulated Slave Trade Act of 1788" (although the registered name of the ship was Brooks). It contains seven figures with captions, and an explanatory paragraph located in the upper right of the document. It shows a configuration of how 454 humans — the maximum allowable under the 1788 Act — could be stowed on the ship.

Figure 1 shows a longitudinal view of the ship, the height of each deck level, and the placement of beams. The slaves were kept on two levels, each level having a maximum height of 2 ft 7 in (0.79 m), and even less underneath the beams. It was thus impossible for a slave to stand during the seven to eight-week transit period, and uncomfortably low even to sit.

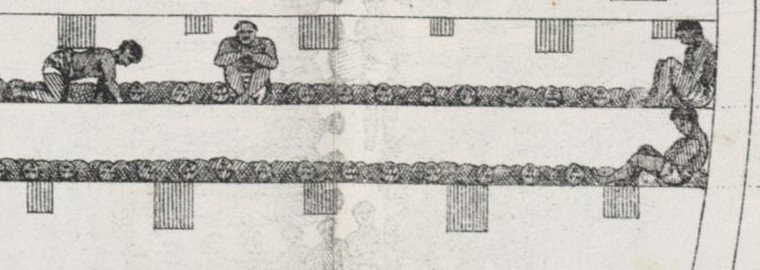
Detail from Figure 1, illustrating height of the decks on which slaves were transported

Figure 2 shows a birds-eye view of the main portion of the Lower Deck level on which 280 slaves are arrayed in a prone position. The surface area of the deck is completely packed with bodies. As one description from the 1800s put it, "So small was the place allowed to each, they had not so much room as a man in a coffin."

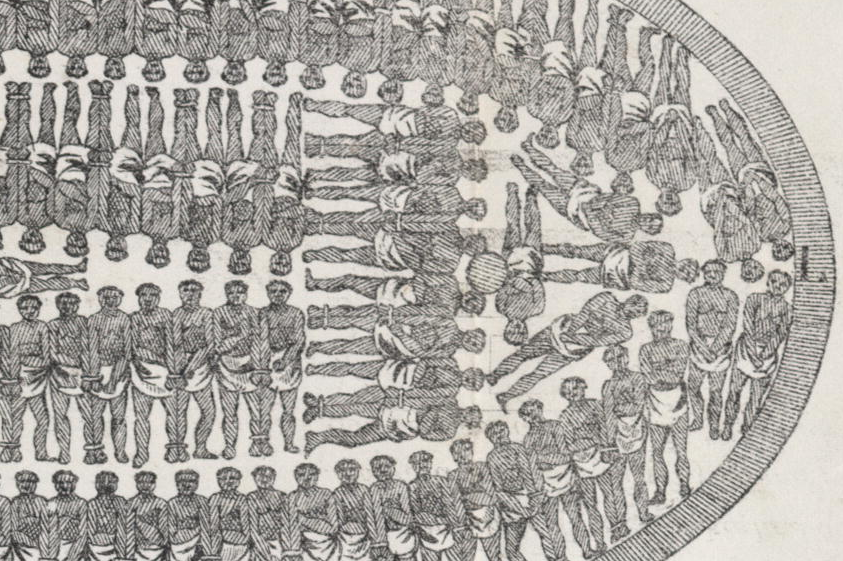
Detail from Figure 2, Lower Deck level

Figure 3 shows how an additional 130 bodies could be arrayed on the wings or sides of the Lower Deck on "shelves", again with bodies packed tightly together. The figure shows women, men, and boys segregated in three separate sections.

Figures 4 - 7 shows additional smaller spaces on the ship near the captain's cabin where a further 40 to 45 slaves could be stowed.

The explanatory text of the document states the purpose of the drawings - to illustrate how 454 slaves could be stowed, and gives the permissible space for each man, woman, and boy ("6 ft by 1 ft 4 In", "5 ft 10 In by 1 ft 4 In", and "5 ft by 1 ft 2 In", respectively). It then states, however, that "so much space as this was seldom allowed", and that at times hundreds more slaves were transported, by "locking them spoonwise", "that is, stowing one within the extended legs of the other."

== Impact and legacy ==
The image became the most widely known and influential image used by anti-slavery campaigns in Britain and the United States. It distilled for many the inhumanity of the slave trade, and was "capable of evoking great emotion amongst its viewers." Thomas Clarkson later commented in his book History of the Rise, Progress, and Accomplishment of the Abolition of the African Slave-Trade (1808) that the "print seemed to make an instantaneous impression of horror upon all who saw it, and was therefore instrumental, in consequence of the wide circulation given it, in serving the cause of the injured Africans." The diagram quickly became widely known across Britain, appearing in pamphlets, newspapers, books, and posters pasted on the walls of pubs, taverns, and coffee houses. Its shock value was in its rendering of conditions that previously had been thought of more abstractly, if at all. As the actual enslavement occurred far away from Britain, slavery was largely hidden from public view in that country.

Versions of the broadside summarized what conditions must have been like. The introduction to the first American publication stated: "Here is presented to our view, one of the most horrid spectacles--a number of human creatures, packed, side by side, almost like herrings in a barrel, and reduced nearly to the state of being buried alive, with just air enough to preserve a degree of life sufficient to make them sensible of all the horror of their situation." A 19th century description: "So close and foul was the stench arising from [the hold], the [captives] have been known to be put down the hold strong and healthy at night; and have been dead in the morning". It has been described as "imaging the unspeakable" and the conditions "shocking" and "horrific."

At least six libraries or museums house originals from the era, including:

- UK National Maritime Museum (Royal Museums Greenwich), Greenwich, London, England
- Hull Museums and Gallery, Wilberforce House, Hull, England. Model wooden ship with paper diagram of enslaved people overlaid
- The British Museum, London, England.
- US Library of Congress, Rare Book and Special Collections Division, Washington, D.C., USA
- Princeton University, Special Collections, Princeton, New Jersey, USA
- Yale University, Beinecke Rare Book and Manuscript Library, New Haven, Connecticut, USA

2007 re-creation in Durham, England. Students wearing red T-shirts lay prone to duplicate the drawing.

The images have been used in various educational activities and art displays. For example, in 2007 Durham University organized a "re-creation" near Durham Cathedral in which 274 students put on red T-shirts and laid on a full-size print-out of the ship's main slave deck, as a way of drawing parallels to issues of slavery and human rights today. A similar activity was held in 2007 at the York Castle Museum. Also in 2007 (the Bicentenary year of the abolition of the slave trade in England), artist Romuald Hazoumè, sponsored by The British Museum, created an artwork entitled La Bouche du Roi, which was a depiction of the Brooks drawings, recreating the layout of human figures and the items used to barter for them. The title of the work comes from the Bouche du Roy area in Benin, from which African slaves were transported to the Americas.

A number of documentary or informational films have incorporated the drawings. These include:

- Africans in America: America's Journey Through Slavery (1998)
- The Atlantic Slave Trade: Crash Course World History (2012)
- The Black Atlantic (1500-1800), The African Americans: Many Rivers to Cross with Henry Louis Gates, Jr. (2013)
- Enslaved, with Samuel L. Jackson (2020 TV series)

The drawing of the Brooks remains today one of the most recognizable and powerful images associated with the slave trade and its abolition. It has been referred to as "along with Charles Minard’s flow map of the Russian campaign of 1812, one of the most important infographics in western civilization", and "One of the most powerful broadsides in Anglo-American history".

Historians Nicholas Radburn and David Eltis wrote that, as harsh as the conditions on the Brooks drawing appear, they actually underrepresent the degree of overcrowding, in that the image portrays how 454 slaves could be stowed, but in several of her voyages the Brooks carried more than 600 slaves, and in one case 740. The authors suggest that a 1770s drawing of the French slave ship Marie Séraphique may be the most accurate depiction of shipboard conditions from the era.
