= La Bouche du Roi =

La Bouche du Roi (French - the king's mouth) may refer to:

- "La Bouche du Roi", the royal catering department within the Maison du roi#The "Bouche du roi" of ancien regime France
- La Bouche du Roi (artwork)

== See also ==
- Bouche du Roy (disambiguation)
