= William Elford =

English banker, politician, and amateur artist

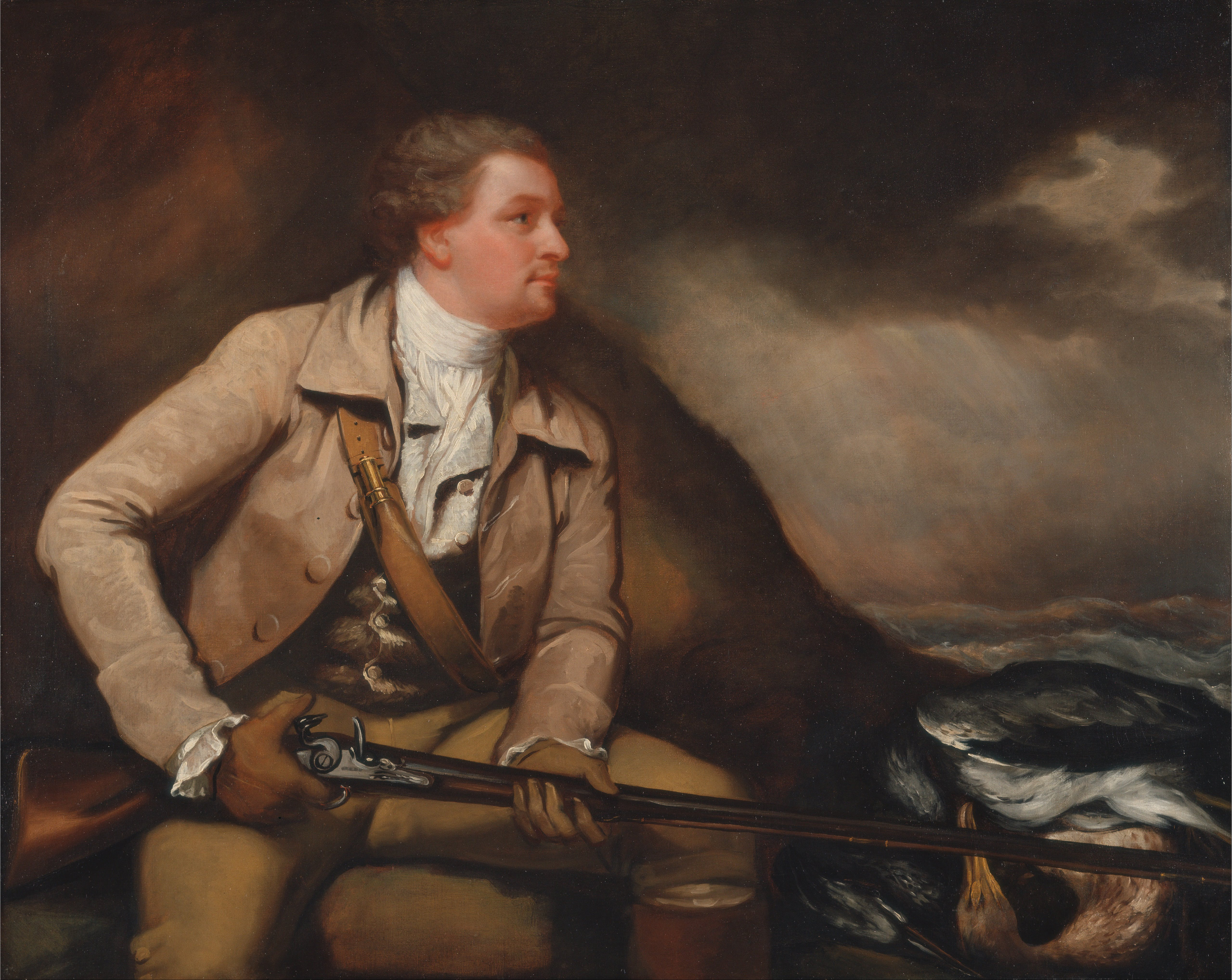
- Born: August 1749
- Died: 30 November 1837 (aged 87–88)
- Occupation: Politician
- Branch: British Army

Sir William Elford, 1st Baronet (August 1749 – 30 November 1837) was an English banker, politician, and amateur artist. He was the creator of the drawing, Plan of the British Slave Ship Brookes, in 1788, which graphically portrayed how African slaves were stowed on a slave ship of the era.

== Background ==
William Elford of Bickham, Buckland Monachorum, Devon, was the elder son of the Reverend Lancelot Elford, of Bickham, and Grace, daughter of Alexander Wills of Kingsbridge, Devonshire. His family was one of the oldest in the west of England.

== Career ==
Elford was a partner in the banking firm at Plymouth of Elford, Tingcombe, & Clerk, and was connected in many capacities with the same town. He was Recorder of Plymouth from 1797 to February 1833 and was afterwards Recorder for Totnes from 1832 to 1834.

He was elected MP for Plymouth from 1796 to 1806, when he was defeated, bringing an unsuccessful petition against his antagonist, Sir C. M. Pole, Bart. He also represented Westbury for some time. In July 1807 he was elected M.P. for Rye, but resigned his seat in July 1808. He was lieutenant-colonel of the South Devon Militia, and in that capacity accompanied his regiment to Ireland during the Irish rebellion, 1798–9. On 29 November 1800 he was created a baronet, of Bickham in the County of Devon.

Elford was a friend of William Pitt the Younger and frequently visited Bath, where he was noted as a whist-player and was acquainted with many of the leading literary characters and artists of his day. He possessed considerable scientific attainments, and in 1790 was elected a Fellow of the Royal Society and in 1813 the Linnaean Society. A few years before his death he published the results of his investigations as to a substitute for common yeast, and his discoveries excited some attention.

Elford was also an artist of note He was a constant contributor to the Royal Academy exhibitions from 1774 to 1837, and his pictures were marked by great taste and good draughtsmanship. The last exhibited by him was painted in his eighty-ninth year. There are three wash drawings by him in the print room at the British Museum. An important picture of his was The White Lady of Avenel, exhibited in 1822, and now in the possession of his grandson, Colonel Henry Cranstoun Adams of Lion House, Exmouth, and Crapstone, Buckland Monachorum. There is a landscape by Elford at Windsor Castle, which he presented to the Prince Regent in 1819, and he also presented pictures painted by himself to the University of Oxford and to many of his friends.

== Anti-slavery activities ==
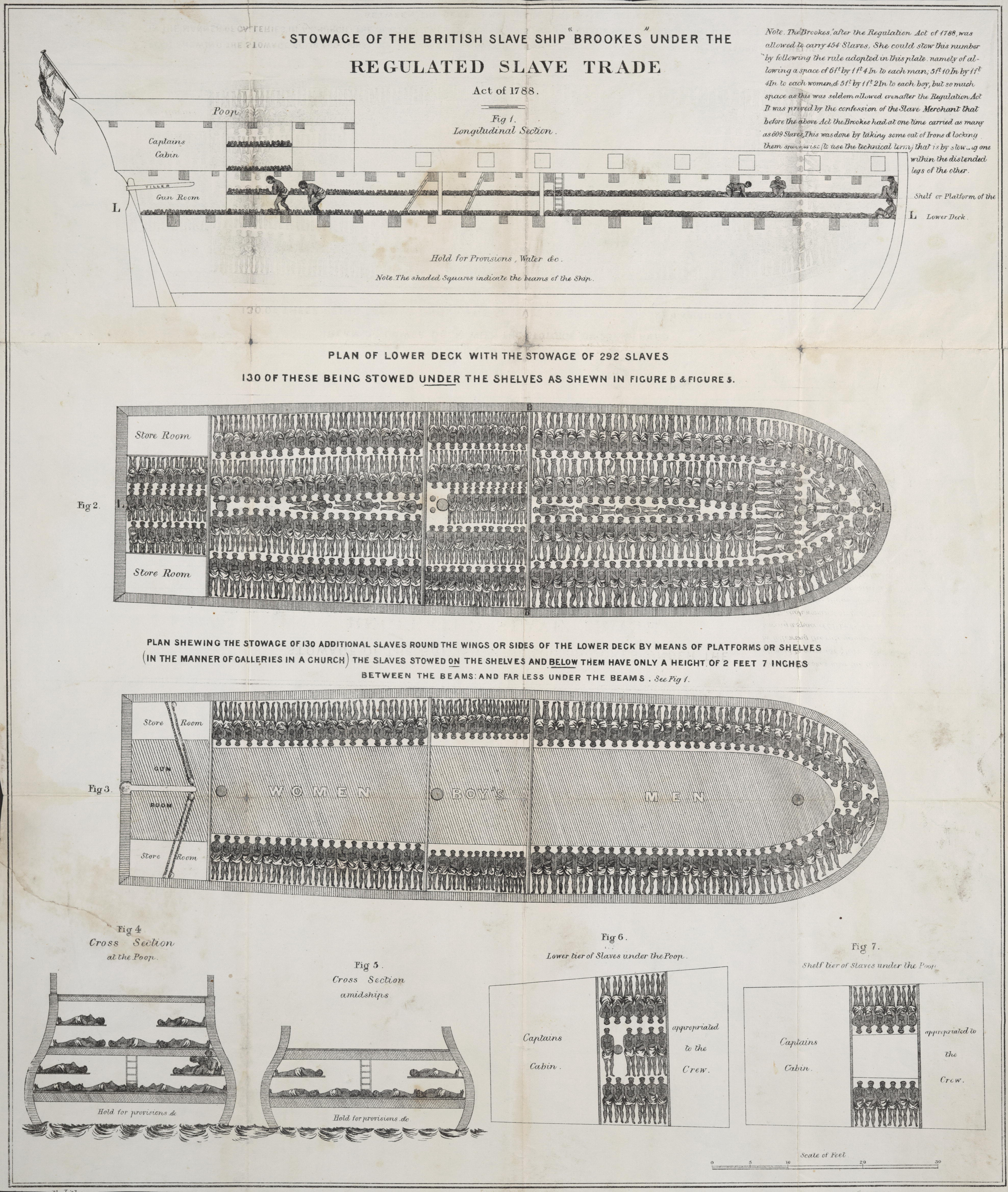
Plan of the British Slave Ship Brooks, 1788

Elford was active in campaigning against slavery.

One of Elford's most significant artworks was the November 1788 drawing of the slave ship Brooks (or Brookes), published in an abolitionist broadside by the Plymouth chapter of the Society for Effecting the Abolition of the Slave Trade. Originally entitled “Plan of an African Ship’s Lower Deck with Negroes in the proportion of only One to a Ton”, the image was then made more widely available in 1789 by the bookseller James Phillips under the title "Plan of the British Slave Ship Brooks." Because it portrayed the human cargo hold of a slave ship in what were described as "shocking" or "barbaric" conditions, it was an oft-reproduced image used as a means of forwarding the abolitionist cause, and one of the most iconic images of the Atlantic slave trade.

== Personal life ==
Elford was ruined when his bank failed in 1825 and after being forced to sell his Bickham estate lived the latter part of his life at the Priory, Totnes, the home of his son-in-law. He was twice married; his first wife was Mary, daughter and heiress of the Rev. John Davies of Plympton, who died in 1817, leaving one son, Jonathan Elford, who married and died in 1823 without issue, and two daughters, Grace Chard, died unmarried 24 Feb. 1856, and Elizabeth, who became the wife of General Sir George Pownoll Adams, K.C.H.; his second wife was Elizabeth, daughter of Humphrey Hall of Manadon, and widow of Lieutenant-colonel Walrond. He died at that place on 30 November 1837, aged 89, and was buried in the parish church, where there is a tablet to his memory. At Elford's death the baronetcy became extinct. James Northcote was an intimate friend of the Elford family, and painted numerous portraits of them, most of which, with others, are in the possession of the grandson, already mentioned, Colonel H. C. Adams, at Exmouth.

Elford was one of the primary correspondents of the writer Mary Mitford and their correspondence is compiled in two books by Rev. A.G. L'Estrange, The Friendships of Mary Russell Mitford published by Harper & Brothers, 1882, and The Life of Mary Russell Mitford, by the same publisher in 1870.

Baronetage of Great Britain
New creation	Baronet (); 1800–1837	Extinct
Preceded by Buxton baronets	Elford baronets of Bickham; 27 November 1800	Succeeded by Dance baronets
