= Community Biodiversity Conservation Area of La Bouche du Roy =

Protected area in Benin

Community Biodiversity Conservation Area of Bouche du Roy
- IUCN category VI (protected area with sustainable use of natural resources)
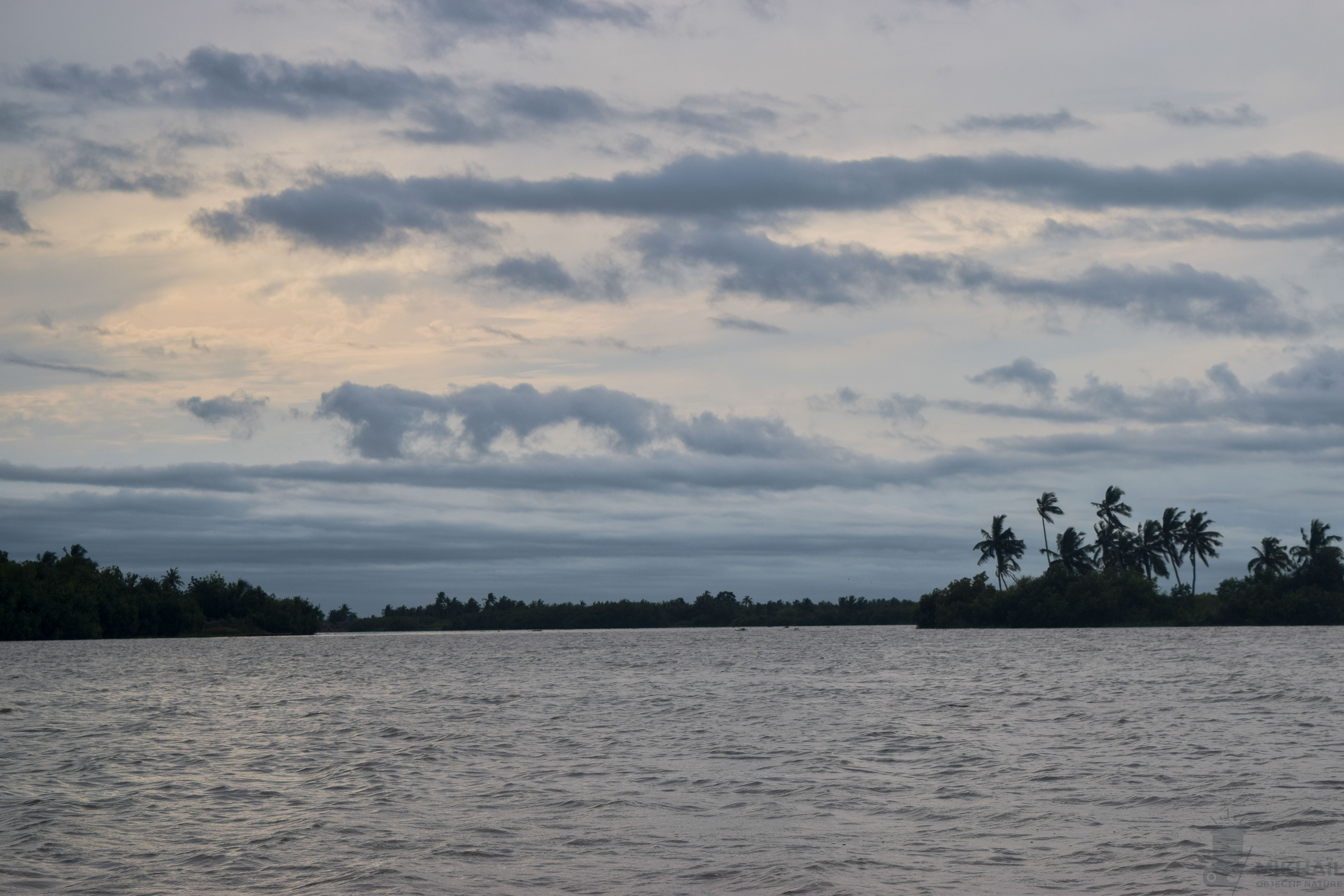
- Grand-Popo lagoon in the CBCA Bouche du Roy

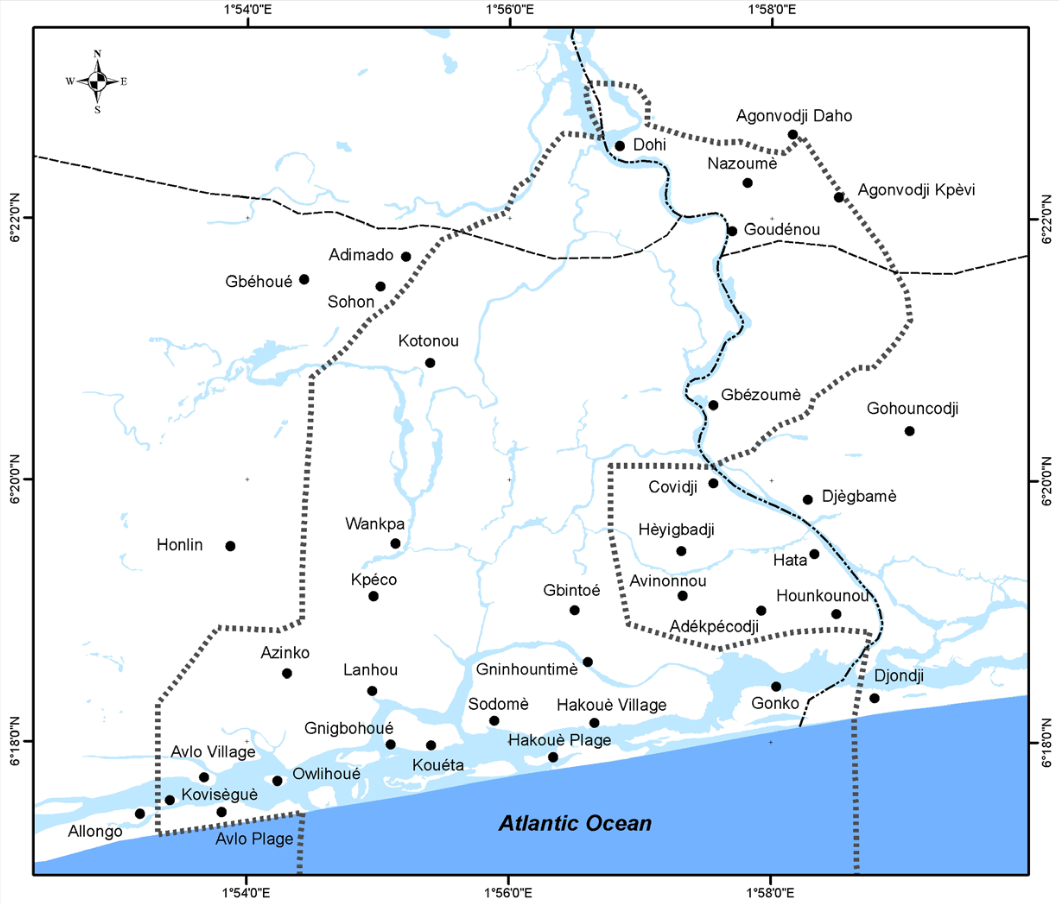
- Location: Mono transboundary biosphere reserve in Benin
- Coordinates: 6°18′N 1°57′E
- Area: 9,678 ha (23,910 acres)
- Established: 2016
- Website: www.boucheduroy.bj

The Community Biodiversity Conservation Area of La Bouche du Roy (CBCA Bouche du Roy) is located in the Mono transboundary biosphere reserve in coastal Benin. It was founded in 2016 and is home to several endangered species.

== Formation ==
In September 2016, the municipalities of Grand-Popo and Comè separately passed decrees to designate a portion of the Bouche du Roy as a protected area known as the Community Biodiversity Conservation Area of Bouche du Roy. The CBCA Bouche du Roy was created to preserve natural resources and biodiversity, as well as to promote sustainable environmental practices. The protected area hosts a marine and coastal area of about 9,678 hectares and is located between 6° 15’ to 6° 23’ N and 1° 52’ to 1° 59’ E. The CBCA Bouche du Roy contains the Mono River, Lake Ahémé, Grand-Popo lagoon, and mangrove forests.

The districts of Avloh and Gbéhoué in Grand-Popo and Agatogbo in Comè, (Note: Another source claims that the CBCA La Bouche du Roy also covers Ouidah and Kpomassè.) along with 17 villages with an estimated total population of 9,814 residents, are located in the CBCA Bouche du Roy. The majority of the residents are either Hula or Xweda. The CBCA Bouche du Roy is divided into three zones: the South East Zone, the North Zone, and the South West Zone.

=== Management ===
The CBCA Bouche du Roy is managed by the Community Biodiversity Conservation Area of La Bouche du Roy (ACP-Doukpo). ACP-Doukpo works directly with municipalities, technical and financial parties, and NGOs, and contains three different Natural Resources Management Councils (CGRNs), one per zone. CGRNs are responsible for implementing major improvements and ensuring that village committees are meeting regularly. Each CGRN is made up of various Village Natural Resource Management Committees (CVGRN) that are composed of representatives of various interest groups (e.g. women's groups, youth groups, and fishermen's associations), whose responsibilities involve local monitoring, restoration, and reforestation.

Beninese NGOs, such as EcoBenin and Nature Tropicale, work with the CBCA Bouche du Roy.

== Biota ==
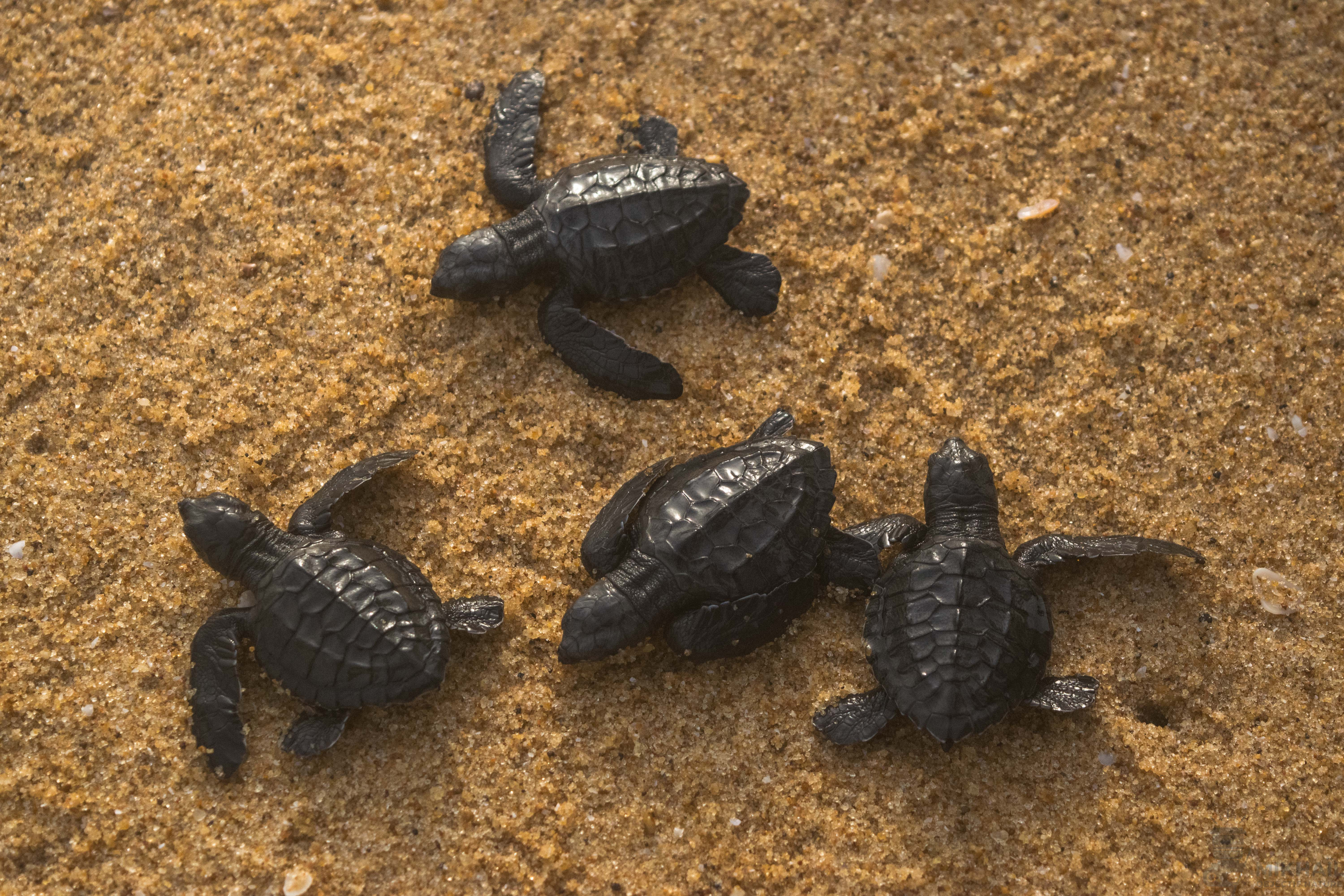
Baby Olive ridley sea turtles in CBCA Bouche du Roy.

The CBCA bouche du Roy is home to several endangered species, such as the African manatee, the African clawless otter, the Green sea turtle, the Hawksbill sea turtle, the Olive ridley sea turtle, and the Leatherback sea turtle. Locals collect snails and harvest oysters in the CBCA Bouche du Roy for food.

The local residents that live in the CBCA Bouche du Roy rely on plants that grow there for medicine, food, and construction. Plants such as the Senegal prickly-ash, Remirea maritima, Rhizophora racemosa, and the poison devil's-pepper are used for traditional medicine, whereas cocoplum and coconuts are collected for food. Fibers from coconut trees, cogongrass, Guinea rush, and Typha australis are used for construction, production of roofs and mats, and feeding animals.

== Culture ==
The CBCA bouche du Roy contains sites used by locals for venerating vodún spirits, such as Mami, Dan, Yehoué, and Zangbeto. Certain areas, mangroves, and waterways in the CBCA Bouche du Roy have been sacralized by entrusting them to the protection of Zangbeto deities to conserve them from destruction. As of 2023, about 503 hectares in the CBCA Bouche du Roy have been sacralized. Locals, regardless of religion, hold a deep reverence for the Zangbeto and refrain from interfering with environments that are associated with them.
