= Museum (TV series) =

- Country of origin: United Kingdom
- No. of episodes: 10

Original release
- Network: BBC Two
- Release: 10 May – 2 August 2007

Museum is a British television documentary series, produced by BBC Wales. It is a behind-the-scenes look at the British Museum, narrated by Ian McMillan and first broadcast on BBC Two on Thursdays at 7.30pm from 10 May 2007. It is in 10 half-hour parts. There is an accompanying hardback book by Rupert Smith.

== Crew ==
- Producer/Directors – Chris Rushton, Anthony Holland
- Assistant Producer – Andrew Tait
- Researcher – Mish Evans
- Technical Assistant – Tom Swingler
- Production Manager – Ellen Davies
- Executive Producer – Sam Organ
- Series Producer – Judith Bunting

== Episodes ==
No.	Title	Original release date
1	"Taking Care of the Past"	10 May 2007
A behind-the-scenes look at the Museum's busy Conservation Department as they treat the Hellenistic bronze sculpture of a youth, affectionately known as 'Charlie', and restore some of the finest ancient Egyptian wall paintings from the tomb of Nebamun (image here).
2	"Bodies of Knowledge"	17 May 2007
The stories behind some of the 8,000 human remains in the Museum's collection, including the Lindow Man and mummies. We see how changing attitudes have led to greater awareness of the sensitivities of indigenous peoples, and witness the historic return of aboriginal ash bundles to representatives of the aboriginal peoples of Tasmania.
3	"The BM Goes East"	24 May 2007
We head east to China to see the Museum's director, Neil MacGregor, measure up terracotta soldiers and strike the deal for Autumn 2007's blockbuster exhibition, The First Emperor. We also follow the BM heavy mob transporting massive Assyrian wall reliefs to an exhibition in China.
4	"Bursting at the Seams"	31 May 2007
The story of the famous building itself – the never ending challenge of updating the storage facilities, dealing with leaks and power cuts, the hawk that chases the pigeons away, and restoring the historic front gates.
5	"Putting on a Blockbuster"	7 June 2007
The preparation and opening of the blockbuster Michelangelo Drawings exhibition with curator Hugo Chapman and a look at how the Museum handles over 5 million visitors a year with some of its dedicated Visitor Hosts.
6	"Shopping for Posterity"	14 June 2007
How the Museum uses limited funds to acquire new objects to complement the existing collections, from the rare 8th-9th-century Coenwulf coin, to remarkable medals and the modern African art installation, La Bouche du Roi.
7	"Curators of the Here and Now"	21 June 2007
Two curators developing and fulfilling cutting edge projects – one with a range of contemporary artists from the Middle East and another staging an installation and workshops with prisoners in Pentonville Prison.
8	"Old Pots and Puzzles"	12 July 2007
An insight into the constant research taking place across the Museum and how to unravel the mysteries of the past, from the decoding of symbols and imagery on Nasca pots to the mysteries of cuneiform tablets and ancient writing.
9	"Things Aren't What They Seem"	26 July 2007
Fakes and replicas: how to spot them and how to make them. The programme features the painstaking creation of a replica of the head of Amenhotep III and a replica Rosetta Stone.
10	"Beyond Bloomsbury"	2 August 2007
The extensive work of the Museum within the community, following the creation of an image of the goddess Durga in the Great Court by master craftsmen from India, and its work throughout the UK with partner institutions, including a massively successful touring exhibition on ancient board games and getting hooked on a 1.8 million-year-old handaxe – as curator Jill Cook says, 'without this stone tool, we wouldn't have our mobiles.’
