= La Bouche du Roi (artwork) =

Artwork by Romuald Hazoumé

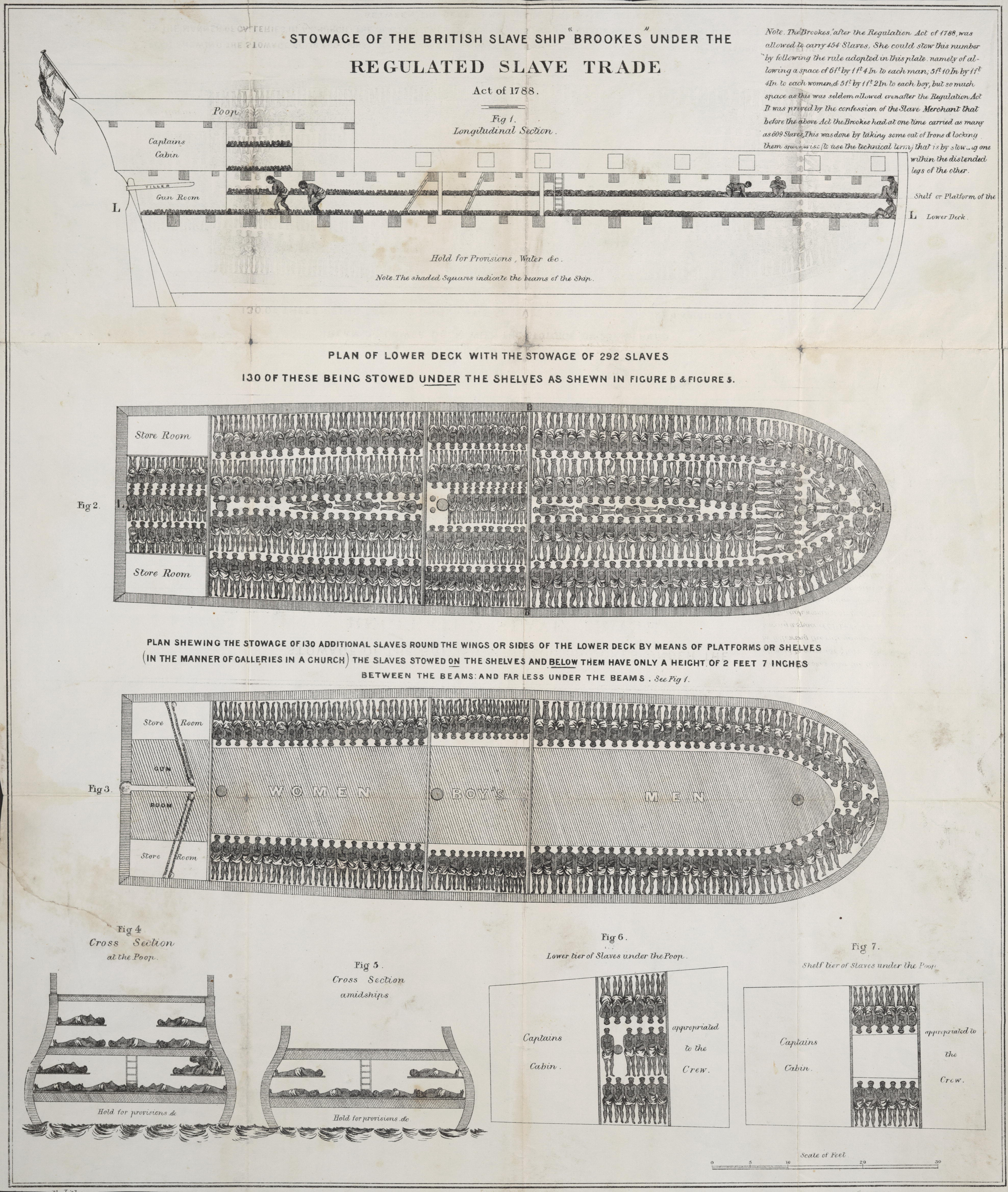
Plan of the British Slave Ship Brooks, 1788 - inspiration for "La Bouche du Roi"

La Bouche du Roi (French - the mouth of the king) is an artwork by Romuald Hazoumé (born 1962), an artist from the Republic of Benin, West Africa, for the 200th anniversary of the abolition of the slave trade. It was bought by the British Museum (with help from the National Art Fund), where it was on display from 22 March to 13 May 2007 before a 2-year tour to Hull (Wilberforce House), Liverpool, Bristol, Newcastle and London (Horniman Museum). The story of its acquisition was told in an episode of the documentary series The Museum.

It was produced between 1997 and 2005 and is named after a place, the Bouche du Roy in Benin from which African slaves were transported to the Caribbean and Americas. In a wider context, it is primarily a warning against all kinds of human greed, exploitation and enslavement, both historical and contemporary. It is made from a combination of materials, including petrol cans (inflated to hold more), spices, and audio and visual elements (e.g. a recitation of Yoruba, Mahi and Wémé names from beneath the masks, the terrible sounds of a slave ship, and a video of black market petrol-runners in modern Benin). The artwork’s arrangement recalls the famous 18th-century print of the slave ship, the Brookes. 304 ‘masks’ are made from these petrol cans, each with an open mouth, eyes and a nose, mirroring the Brookes images, yet gives back individuality and African cultures to the slaves by including tokens of African gods (Vodou or orisha) attached to each 'face'. Two masks at the stern of the ship - with the scales of justice between them - represent the white king imposed on Benin and the native king of Benin, dealing with African and European culpability for the trade. Liquor bottles, beads and cowrie shells are also included as examples of material which was used to barter for slaves, as are tobacco and spices, their smells mixed with those of a slave ship.
