= Marie Séraphique =

Slave ship

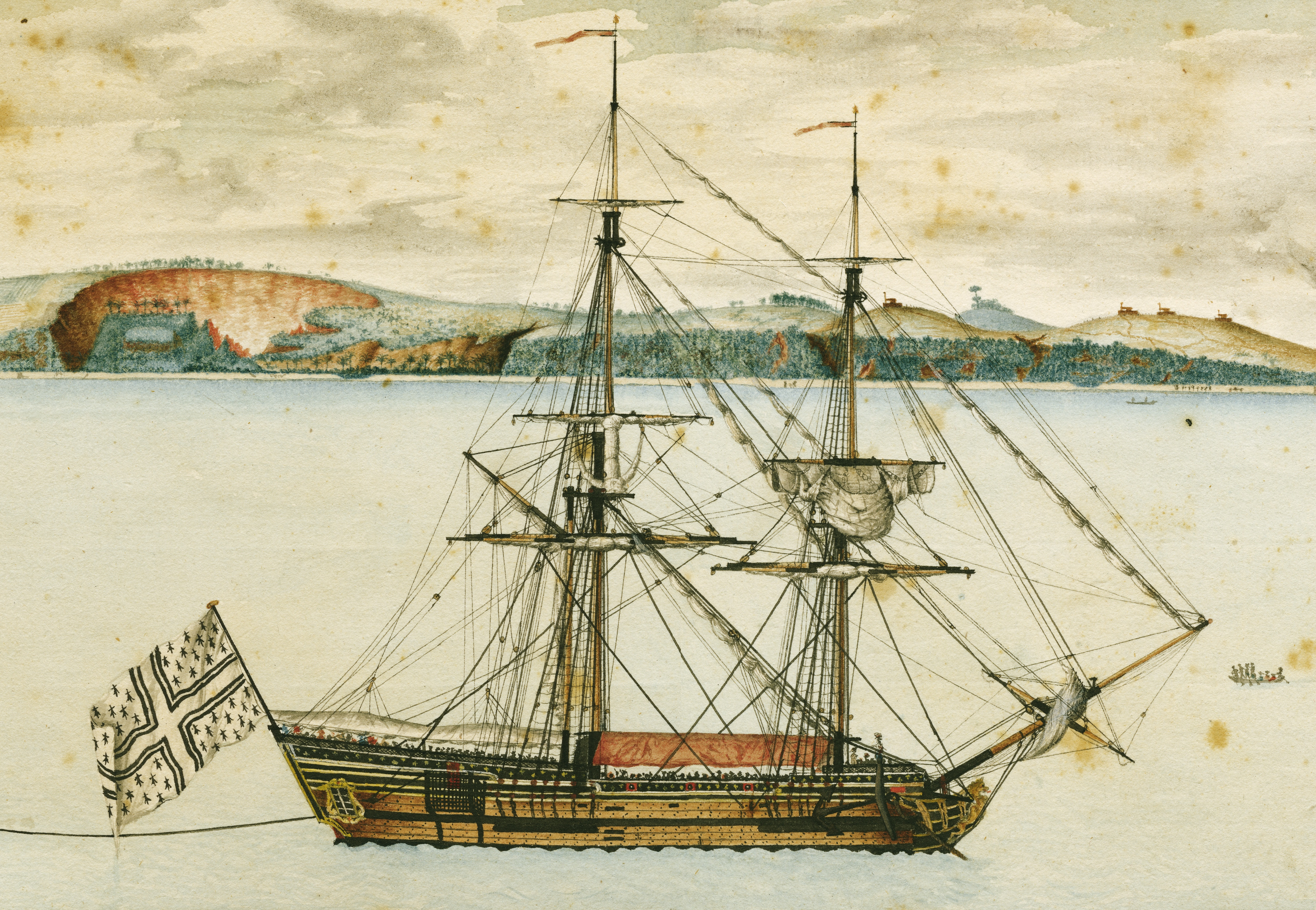
Painting of Marie Séraphique slave ship

The Marie Séraphique was a late 18th-century slave ship that made six slave voyages out of Nantes, France. There are two illustrations of the ship that show how captives travelled, believed to have been painted by the captain and second lieutenant. There is a diagram showing densely-packed shackled slaves on the ship, and a painting showing slaves being sold aboard.

== Construction ==
Marie Séraphique was built in Nantes and launched with the name Dannecourt in October 1764. It was a purpose-built slave vessel measuring approximately 67 feet by 24 feet 5 inches (20.5 × 7.5 meters), and carried an average of 357 people on its six voyages. It was, in most respects, a typical construction for the era. The vessel was rigged with two masts as a snow, cheaper, faster, and about 21% smaller than a typical slaving full-rigged ship (it would not have been called a "ship" in English at the time, a term describing a three-masted vessel).

== History ==
As Dannecourt, it completed one slave voyage, and in 1769 it was sold to Jacques Gruel. He changed the name of the ship to Marie Séraphique, after his wife's Christian name. Under his ownership, it completed four slave voyages before it was again sold and renamed Sartine. Under this name, it completed one final slave voyage.

== Illustrations of the vessel ==
=== Slave voyage of 1769–1770 ===
Drawing of Marie Séraphique showing the slave deck and number of captives

In 1769–1770, the Marie Séraphique sailed between Loango and Saint-Domingue, and could carry 307 slaves. In 2005, a painting and associated drawings were discovered that illustrate the voyage, offering a unique historical record of the slave trade. Historians Nicholas Radburn and David Eltis have described the illustration as "the most accurate contemporary depiction of ship-board conditions in the transatlantic slave trade during the late eighteenth century".

The Marie Séraphique appears to be a "floating prison". The men are drawn in detail, naked as they would have been, their right legs shackled to the legs of the adjacent men. The women wear blue skirts covering only the lower part of their body. The captives lie in rows with 6 foot 3 inches per person. They are lying on their right hand side with their right arms shackled to the left arms of their adjacent captives. "While the captives are in rows, they still appear as people in a crowded prison, with legs, arms, and heads tangled together; bodies stretched uncomfortably across wooden beams; and others pushed into corners".

The people are drawn in great detail. They differ in height and appearance, some of the women are wearing beads, one woman is cradling a baby at her breast. Some captives are painted in agony, separated from the rest due to sickness.

The image is held by the Musée d'Histoire de Nantes, whose curator believes it was painted by Jean-Rene L'Hermite, the second lieutenant, and Fautrel-Gaugy, the captain, who came from an accomplished family of Nantes artists. The illustration is not signed nor dated, however given the long periods of time the ships crew were at sea it is more likely that the painting was completed at sea, rather than afterwards on land.

A table at the bottom of the illustration details the number of slaves embarked and disembarked, the dates of the voyage, data regarding the cargo and financial details.

=== Slave voyage of 1773 ===
A slave sale taking place on the Marie Séraphique in 1773

A painting of the Marie Seraphique was discovered in 1893 that matches the illustration of the 1769–1770 voyage. The illustration is signed by Jean-Rene L'Hermite and shows the ship at Saint-Domingue in 1773 during a slave sale. A few of the people wearing European-style clothing and wigs appear to have black skin.

Historians Nicholas Radburn and David Eltis write it is "the only extant picture of an American slave sale in the legal era of the transatlantic slave trade."

== Sources ==
- Radburn, Nicholas; Eltis, David (2019-03-01). "Visualizing the Middle Passage: The Brooks and the Reality of Ship Crowding in the Transatlantic Slave Trade" (PDF). The Journal of Interdisciplinary History. 49 (4): 533–565. doi:10.1162/jinh_a_01337. ISSN 0022-1953. S2CID 67876622.
