= Romuald Hazoumè =

Beninese artist (born 1962)

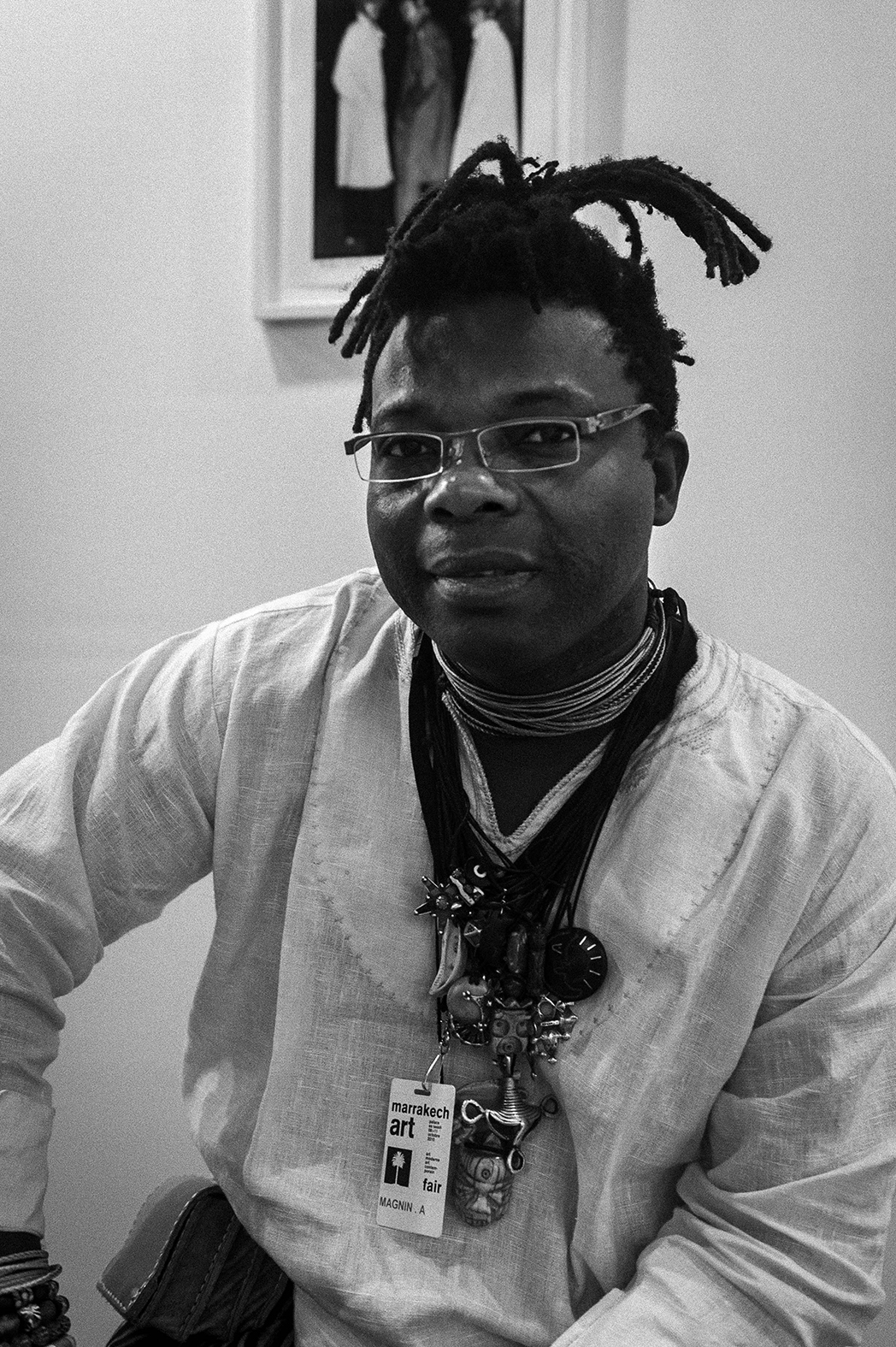
- Hazoumè in 2010
- Born: 1962 (age 63–64); Porto-Novo, Republic of Dahomey
- Occupation: Artist
- Notable work: La Bouche du Roi

Romuald Hazoumè (born 1962) is a Beninese Yoruba artist and sculptor.

He is best known for his work La Bouche du Roi, a reworking of the 1789 image of the slave ship Brookes. La Bouche du Roi was widely exhibited in the United Kingdom as part of the centenary remembrance of the Slave Trade Act 1807 by Parliament. He only uses recycled materials to create his works.

Hazoumè is also known for his mask series, which he started in the mid-1980s. These masks, made from discarded gasoline canisters, resemble those used in traditional African culture and ceremonies. In explaining these works, Hazoumè has said: "I send back to the West that which belongs to them, that is to say, the refuse of consumer society that invades us every day."

Hazoumè is among the artists represented in The Contemporary African Art Collection (CAAC) of Jean Pigozzi.

== Selected exhibitions ==
=== Solo ===
- 1997: Romuald Hazoumè, Galerie 20, Arnhem
- 1998: Romuald Hazoumè, Art Gallery of New South Wales, shush, Sydney, Australia
- 2001: Romuald Hazoumè, Galerie Olivier Houg, Lyon
- 2005: ARTicle 14 - débrouilles-toi, toi-même, October Gallery, London
- 2005: Romuald Hazoumè Installation Art, CAISA (City of Helsinki Cultural Office), Helsinki, Finland
- 2006: La Bouche du Roi, Musée du quai Branly, Paris, France
- 2007: La Bouche du Roi: An artwork by Romuald Hazoumè, The British Museum, London, England
- 2008: La Bouche du Roi, Horniman Museum and Gardens, London
- 2009: Exit Ball, Aliceday, Brussels, Belgium
- 2009: Romuald Hazoumè: Made in Porto-Novo, October Gallery, London
- 2010: Romuald Hazoumè: My Paradise - Made in Porto Novo, Gerisch-Stiftung, Neumünster, Germany
- 2011: Romuald Hazoumè
- 2012: Cargoland - October Gallery, London

=== Group ===
- 1992: Out of Africa: Contemporary African Artists from the Pigozzi Collection, Saatchi Gallery, London
- 1999: Liverpool Biennial: International Festival of Contemporary Art, Liverpool, UK
- 1999: Paradise 8, Exit Art, New York
- 1999: Spaceship Earth, Art in General, New York
- 2004–2007: Africa Remix, Dusseldorf; Hayward Gallery, London; Centre Pompidou, Paris; Mori Art Museum, Tokyo; Moderna Museet, Stockholm, Johannesburg Art Gallery, Johannesburg, South Africa
- 2007/2008: Why Africa?, Pinacoteca Giovanni e Marella Agnelli, Turin, Italy
- 2007: From Courage to Freedom - El Anatsui / Romuald Hazoumè / Owusu-Ankomah, October Gallery, London
- 2007: UN/FAIR TRADE, Die Kunst der Gerechtigkeit, Neue Galerie Graz am Landesmuseum Joanneum, Graz, Austria
- 2008: Angaza Afrika - African Art Now, October Gallery, London
- 2008: PetrodollART, Galerie Motte et Rouard, Paris, France
- 2009: Against Exclusion, 3rd biennale of Contemporary Art, The Garage Center for Contemporary Culture, Moscow, Russia
- 2010: African Stories, Marrakech Art Fair], Marrakech
- 2010/2011: 21st Century: Art in the First Decade, Queensland Art Gallery, Brisbane, Australia
- 2010/2011: The Global Africa Project, MAD – Museum of Arts and Design, New York
- 2010/2011: The Land Between Us, Whitworth Art Gallery, Manchester, UK

== Awards and prizes ==
- 1996: George-Maciunas-Preis, Wiesbaden
- 2007: Arnold-Bode-Preis, documenta 12, Kassel
- 2009: 3rd Biennale of Contemporary Art, Moscow
