= Bickham =

Bickham is a surname. Notable people with the surname include:

- Charles G. Bickham (1867–1944), United States Army officer
- Clint Bickham, American voice actor
- Dan Bickham (1864–1951), American baseball player
- Ernest Bickham Sweet-Escott (1857–1941), British colonial administrator
- George Bickham the Elder (1684–1758), English etcher and engraver
- George Bickham the Younger (c. 1706–1771), English etcher and engraver
- Jack Bickham (1930–1997), American writer
- Moreese Bickham (1917–2016), American anti-death penalty activist

== See also ==
- Bickham, a hamlet in the civil parish of Timberscombe, Somerset, England
