= Gbéhoué =

Coordinates: 6.3488°N 1.8065°E

- Arrondissement
- Interactive map of Gbéhoué
- Country: Benin
- Department: Mono Department
- Commune: Grand-Popo

Population (2002)
  - Total: 4,453
- Time zone: UTC+1 (WAT)

Gbéhoué is an arrondissement in the Mono department of Benin. It is an administrative division under the jurisdiction of the commune of Grand-Popo. According to the population census conducted by the Institut National de la Statistique Benin on February 15, 2002, the arrondissement had a total population of 4453.
