= Bouche du Roy =

Estauary in Benin

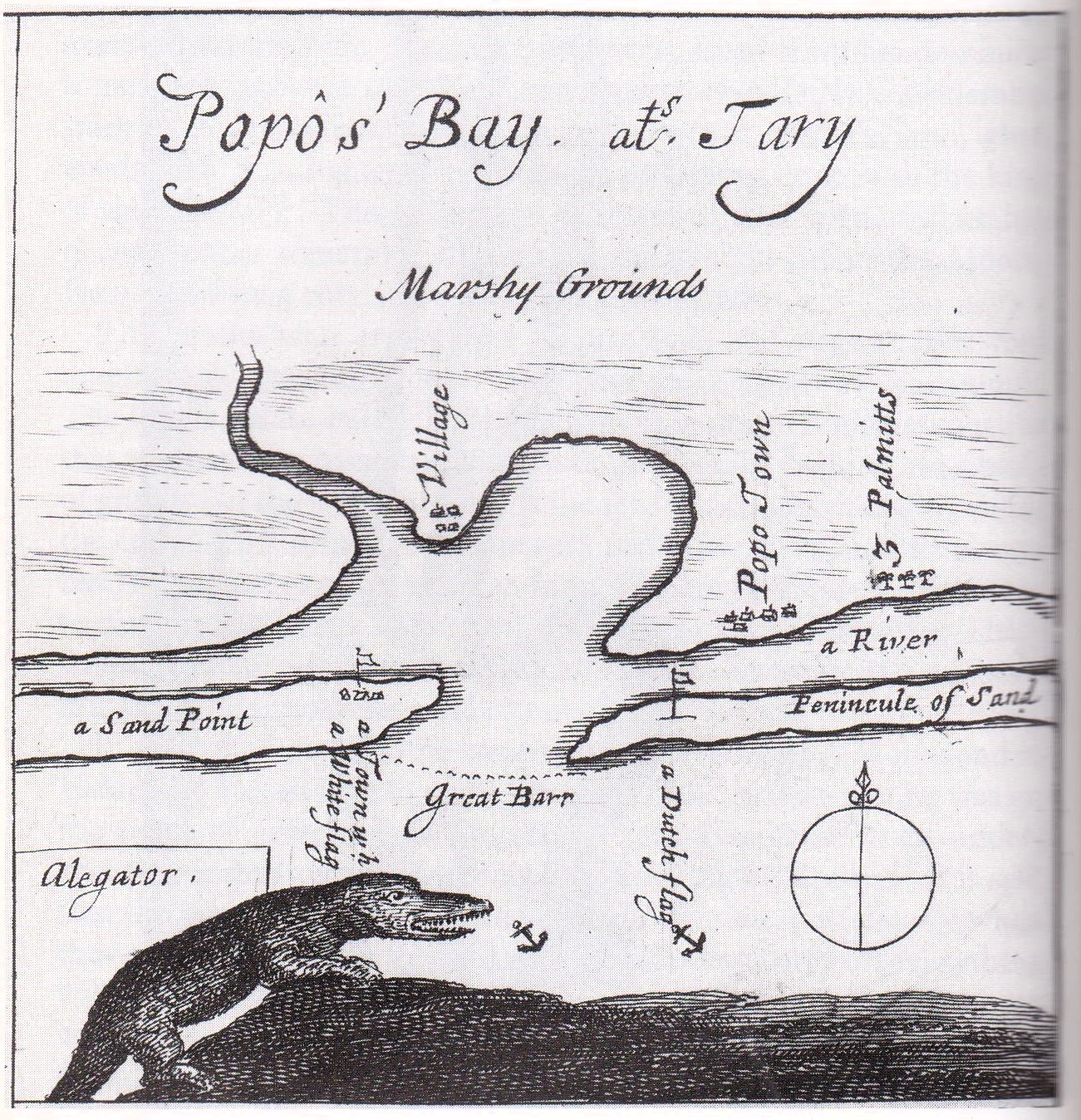
Illustration of Grand-Popo and a portion of the Bouche du Roy (1686)

The Bouche du Roy is an estuary in Benin where the Mono River, Grand-Popo lagoon, and Lake Ahémé flow into the Gulf of Guinea. As of 2016, a protected area was established on a portion of the Bouche du Roy.

== History ==
=== Nomenclature and description ===
The name Bouche du Roy is a gallicization of the Portuguese phrase Boca do rio (mouth of the river). The body of water was also called by different names, such as the "Papoues" in the 16th century and the "River of the Popos" in the 17th century.

The point where the Bouche du Roy opens to the Atlantic Ocean has changed throughout history. The depth of the opening varies greatly depending on the season and as such is easily navigable to canoes in the rainy season, but significantly harder to traverse in the dry season. During heavy rains, the surrounding bodies of water swell with fresh water and the Bouche du Roy serves as an outlet to the sea. The higher water level turns flooded land into swamps and sometimes creates temporary outlets along the sandspit from the lagoon into the ocean. During dry seasons, the Bouche du Roy serves as an inlet for the sea and bodies of water upstream would harbor saltwater fish. Historically, the Hula people have produced salt from dried up portions of nearby lagoons during the dry season. The Bouche du Roy served as the border between the Hula kingdom and other polities, such as the Hueda kingdom and the Dahomey.

=== Cultural impact ===
The piece La Bouche du Roi by Beninese artist Romuald Hazoumè is named after this estuary.

== Conservation ==
A portion of the Bouche du Roy is protected by the Community Biodiversity Conservation Area of La Bouche du Roy. The IUCN Category VI protected area was established in 2016 and is home to several endangered species, such as the African manatee, the African clawless otter, and the Leatherback sea turtle.
