= Brooks (1781 ship) =

British slave ship 1781–1804

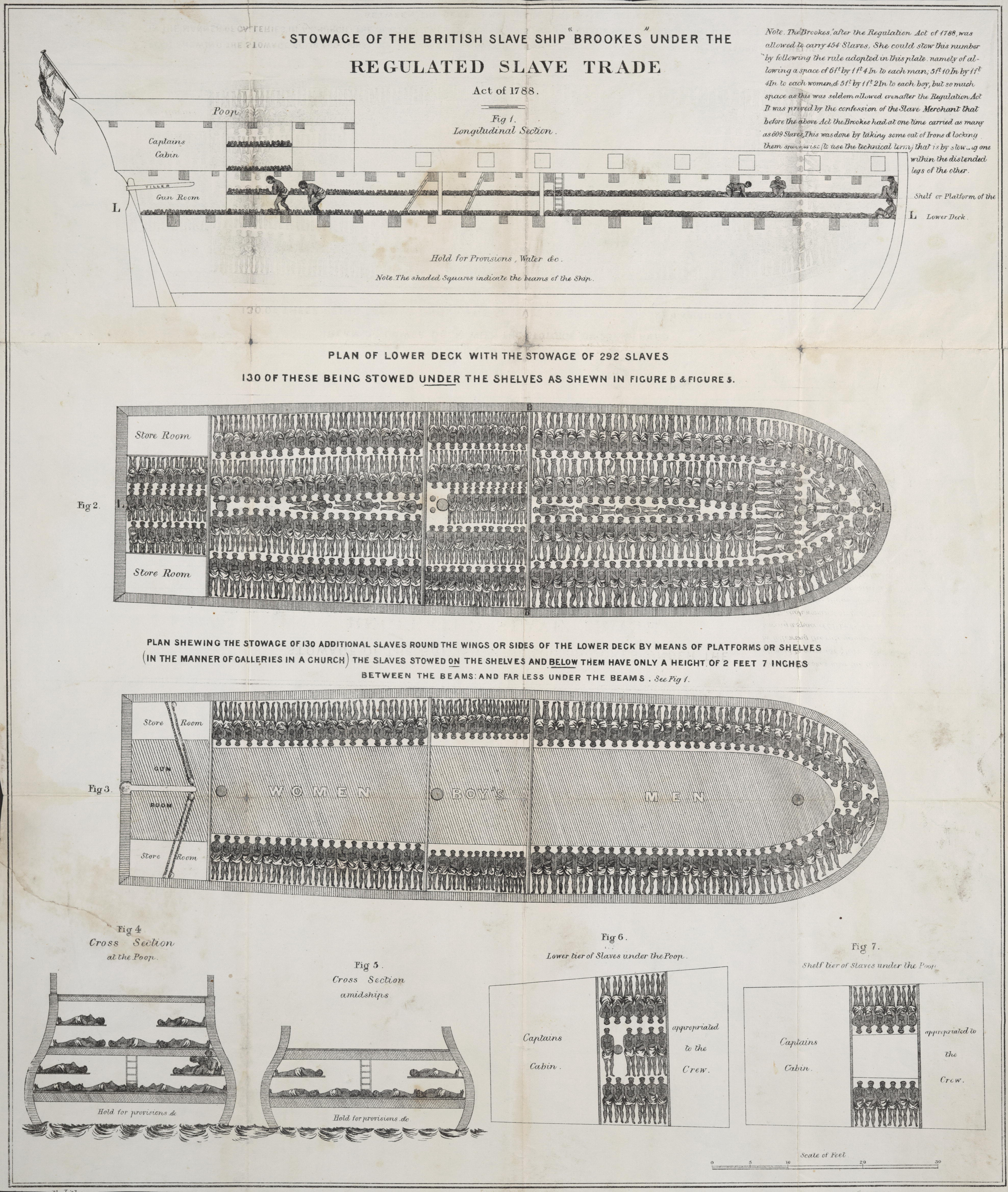
- Plan of the British Slave Ship Brooks, 1788

History

→ Great Britain → United Kingdom
- Name: Brooks
- Launched: 1781
- Fate: Condemned and sold 1809

General characteristics
- Type: Slave ship
- Tons burthen: 297, or 300, or 319, or 352, or 353 (bm)
- Length: 30 metres (98 ft)
- Beam: 8.2 metres (27 ft)
- Complement: 1794: 15; 1799: 25; 1804: 50
- Armament: 1781: 18 × 9 & 6-pounder guns; 1794: 12 × 6-pounder guns; 1799: 18 × 9-pounder guns; 1800: 18 × 9-pounder guns + 2 × 18-pounder carronades; 1804: 18 × 9-pounder guns + 2 × 18-pounder carronades

Brooks (or Brook, Brookes) was a British slave ship launched at Liverpool in 1781. She became infamous after prints of her were published in 1788. Between 1782 and 1804, she made 11 voyages from Liverpool in the triangular slave trade in enslaved people (for the Brooks, England, to Africa, to the Caribbean, and back to England). During this period she spent some years as a West Indiaman. She also recaptured a British merchantman and captured a French merchantman. Brooks's last voyage shipping enslaved people was to Montevideo in the South Atlantic where she was condemned as unseaworthy in November 1804.

== History ==
A British Member of Parliament, Sir William Dolben, 3rd Baronet, toured and investigated Brooks. This led to the publishing of her plans and design by Thomas Clarkson, an abolitionist. An engraving created by Sir William Elford, an accomplished artist and likewise an abolitionist, was first published in Plymouth in 1788 by the Plymouth chapter of the Society for Effecting the Abolition of the Slave Trade depicted the conditions on board Brookes, and has become an iconic image of the inhumanity of the trade in enslaved people. Prime Minister William Pitt supported Dolben's Bill. This was instrumental in getting the bill rapidly passed as the Regulated Slave Trade Act 1788.

The image portrayed captives arranged on the ship's lower deck and poop deck, in accordance with the Regulated Slave Trade Act 1788.

Brookes was reportedly allowed to stow 454 African captives, by allowing a space of 6 feet (1.8 m) by 1 foot 4 inches (0.41 m) to each man, 5 feet 10 inches (1.78 m) by 1 foot 4 inches (0.41 m) to each woman, and 5 feet (1.5 m) by 1 foot 2 inches (0.36 m) to each child. However, the poster's text alleges that a slave trader confessed that before the Act, Brookes had carried as many as 609 captives at one time.

Other records indicate several other issues with the image. The image portrays 487 captives, while on the voyage prior to when the measurements were taken the ship held 638 captives, the next journey 744, and the journey following the measurements, 609. The ship's planking as depicted around the outside perimeter is disproportionately thick. Stowage of captives on multiple layers of decks does not allow for the storage of water and provisions, which was the common practice. No deck hatches are illustrated, only small ladders. There would be no way for the ship to load and unload provisions, especially for the legs of the voyages with no captives aboard. Despite these flaws, this image has become the one most used to depict conditions on a slave ship.

Other physical objects that also were part of slave ships are not depicted. Slave ships had security features to keep the crew safe from their human cargo, such as a barricade or wall to separate them while outside; nets alongside the ship to prevent captives from jumping overboard; and armaments to keep the ship from being taken by pirates or, after 1793, privateers. Below deck bulkheads to separate women and children from men should be shown. Below deck, portholes were common to allow more ventilation, while outside of the ship sails positioned alongside funneled air below. These special sails made it easy to identify a slave ship at sea. Above deck, there would be a large cook stove to prepare the meals, commonly rice and beans, for the captives.

== Career ==
Brook first appeared in Lloyd's Register (LR) in 1781.

Year	Master	Owner	Trade	Source
1781	C.Noble	J. Brook	Liverpool–Africa	LR

1st voyage transporting enslaved people (1781–1783): Captain Clement Noble sailed from Liverpool on 4 October 1781. Brooks arrived in Africa on 15 January 1782. She acquired captives first at Cape Coast Castle and then at Anomabu. She left Africa on 14 July, and arrived at Kingston, Jamaica on 12 September. She had embarked 650 captives and she arrived with 646. She left Kingston on 22 December and arrived back at Liverpool on 22 February 1783. She had left Liverpool with 58 crew members and she suffered eight crew deaths on her voyage.

2nd voyage transporting enslaved people (1783–1784): Captain Clement Noble sailed from Liverpool on 3 June 1783. She acquired captives at Anomabu and then touched at Cape Coast Castle before sailing for Jamaica. She left Africa on 19 April 1784, and arrived at Kingston on 3 June. She had embarked 619 captives and she arrived with 586, for a 5% mortality rate. She sailed from Kingston on 18 July and arrived back at Liverpool on 28 August. She had left Liverpool with 46 crew members and she suffered three crew deaths on her journey.

3rd voyage transporting enslaved people (1785–1786): Captain Clement Noble sailed from Liverpool on 2 February 1785. Brooks arrived in Africa on 1 May. She acquired her captives first at Cape Coast Castle and then at Anomabu. She left Africa on 16 November and arrived at Kingston on 29 December. She had embarked 740 captives and she arrived with 635, for a 14% mortality rate. She actually landed 608. She left Kingston on 12 February 1786 and arrived back at Liverpool on 10 April.

4th voyage transporting enslaved people (1786–1788): Captain Thomas Molyneux sailed from Liverpool on 17 October 1786 and arrived in Africa on 11 January 1787. Brooks acquired captives at Anomabu, Cape Coast Castle, and lastly Dixcove. She sailed from Africa on 14 August and arrived at Kingston on 4 October. She had embarked 609 captives and she arrived with 596, for a 2% mortality rate. She sailed from Kingston on 18 December and arrived back at Liverpool on 8 February 1788. She had left Liverpool with 45 crew members and suffered six crew deaths on her voyage.

Brooks did not appear in LR in the 1791 volume; she returned in the 1792 volume. She had undergone repairs in 1791 and thereafter her burthen was given as 319 tons, up from 297–300.

Dolben's Act had imposed a cap on the number of captives a slave ship was permitted to carry without facing a penalty. At 319 ton burthen, the cap for Brookes was 456. The Act also established bonuses for low mortality among the captives. Masters received a bonus of £100 for a mortality rate of under 2%; the ship's surgeon received £50. For a mortality rate between two and three percent, the bonus was halved. There was no bonus if mortality exceeded 3%.

Year	Master	Owner	Trade	Source & notes
1792	G.Hariot	Harper & Co.	Liverpool–Africa	LR; repairs 1791.

5th voyage transporting enslaved people (1791–1792): Captain George Hault sailed from Liverpool on 29 July 1791. Brooks arrived in Africa on 22 September. Brooks had gathered her slaves at Bonny and left Africa on 10 December. She delivered 408 captives to Dominica on 26 January 1792. She left Dominica on 14 March, and arrived back at Liverpool on 27 April. She had left Liverpool with 38 crew members and suffered one crew death on her voyage.

6th voyage transporting enslaved people (1792–1793): Captain John Hewan sailed from Liverpool on 6 June 1792. Brooks arrived in Africa on 24 September. She acquired captives at Bonny and left Africa on 15 November. She arrived at Montego Bay, Jamaica on 13 January 1793. She had embarked 450 captives and arrived with 396, for a 12% mortality rate. She sailed from Montego Bay on 8 February, and arrived back at Liverpool on 26 March. She had left Liverpool with 36 crew members and she suffered three crew deaths on her voyage.

Next, Brooks became a West Indiaman for several years before resuming slaving.

Year	Master	Owner	Trade	Source
1793	G.Harriott; Roger Poosey	Harper & Co.	Liverpool–Africa	LR; repairs 1791
1794	R.Poosey; T.Hawkins	Harper & Co.	Liverpool–Africa; Liverpool–Martinique	LR; repairs 1791

War with France had broken out and Captain Thomas Hawkins acquired a letter of marque on 20 May 1794.

Year	Master	Owner	Trade	Source
1795	T.Hawkins	Harper & Co.	Liverpool–Martinique	LR; repairs 1791
1796	T.Hawkins; Richardson	Harper & Co.	Liverpool–Martinique; Liverpool–Africa	LR; repairs 1791

7th voyage transporting enslaved people (1796–1797): Captain John Richards sailed from Liverpool on 8 July 1796. In 1796, 103 vessels sailed from English ports, bound for the trade in enslaved people; 94 of these vessels sailed from Liverpool.

Brooks arrived in Africa on 25 September. Brooks acquired captives at Loango and Ambriz. She sailed from Africa on 11 January 1797, and arrived at St Croix on 28 February. She had embarked 453 captives and she arrived with 384, for a 15% mortality rate. She sailed from St Croix on 16 April and arrived back at Liverpool on 28 May. She had left Liverpool with 39 crew members and suffered two crew deaths on her voyage.

8th voyage transporting enslaved people (1797–1798): Captain Richards sailed from Liverpool on 24 August 1797, bound for West Africa. In 1797, 104 vessels sailed from English ports, bound for the trade in enslaved people; 90 of these vessels sailed from Liverpool.

Brooks arrived at Kingston on 7 May 1798 with 446 captives. At Jamaica, Richards died on 16 June, and Captain John Williams replaced him. She sailed for Liverpool on 14 August.

As Brooks, Williams, master, was leaving Jamaica she ran onshore at Port Antonio; she was gotten off with the loss of her rudder. Brooks arrived back at Liverpool on 25 October. She brought with her Clermont, Bartels, master. Clermont had been sailing from North Carolina with a cargo of turpentine and other products when Brooks recaptured her. The French privateer Gironde had captured Clermont near the Newfoundland Banks. (Note: Clermont, of 242 tons (bm), had been launched in South Carolina in 1786. She was owned by an American.)

9th voyage transporting enslaved people (1799): Captain Moses Joynson acquired a letter of marque on 16 January 1799. Brooks sailed from Liverpool on 8 February. In 1799, 156 vessels sailed from English ports, bound for the trade in enslaved people; 134 of these vessels sailed from Liverpool.

However, Brooks soon ran into difficulties that resulted in the cancellation of her voyage. She was driven from her moorings on to the Cheshire shore. She was full of water.

Brooks was rebuilt in 1799 and returned with a burthen of 353 or 359 tons. LR showed her master as J. Slothart, but the slave-trade voyage data reports her master on her 10th voyage as Joynson. The ship arrival and departure data in Lloyd's List confirms that her master was Joynson, not Slothart or Stothart. (Note: John Stothart was master of the slave ship William Heathcote and sailing on a slave trading voyage in 1801-1802.)

10th voyage transporting enslaved people (1800–1801): Captain Joynson sailed from Liverpool on 18 November 1800. In 1801, 147 vessels sailed from English ports, bound for the trade in enslaved people; 122 of these vessels sailed from Liverpool.

Brooks acquired captives at Malembo and delivered them to Demerara. She arrived there on 9 June 1801, with 324 captives . Lloyd's List reported on 3 March 1801, that a schooner, bound for St Domingo from Bordeaux, had come into Dominica. The schooner was a prize to Brooks and William Heathcote, of Liverpool.

Brooks returned to Liverpool on 16 September. She had left Liverpool with 45 crew members and she suffered 11 crew deaths on her voyage.

Captain William Murdock acquired a letter of marque on 2 April 1804.

11th voyage transporting enslaved people (1804): Captain Murdock sailed from Liverpool on 3 May 1804. In 1804, 147 vessels sailed from English ports, bound for the trade in enslaved people; 126 of these vessels sailed from Liverpool.

Brooks acquired captives in the Congo and then in Cabinda. She sailed from Africa on 19 September. She arrived at Montevideo on 14 November. She had embarked 322 captives and she arrived with 320, for a mortality rate of 1%, a result that would have qualified her master and surgeon for the full bonus. She had left Liverpool with 54 crew members and she suffered two crew deaths on her voyage.

== Fate ==
Brooks was condemned at Montevideo as unseaworthy.

== Legacy ==
In July 2007, students and staff at Durham University in northeast England re-created the image of the Brookes print to draw attention to the atrocities of the Middle Passage, in an exercise that involved lying on the ground in a manner similar to the slaves arranged on the Brookes.
