= Black Joke (ship) =

Several ships have borne the name Black Joke, after an English song of the same name.

== Slave ship ==
- Black Joke (1720 ship), made three voyages as a slave ship between 1764 and 1767.

== Naval vessels ==
- HMS Black Joke, the captured slave ship Henriquetta, commissioned in 1827, was employed in suppressing the slave trade and deliberately burnt as no longer serviceable in 1832 on orders from London.
- Hired armed cutter Black Joke was a hired armed cutter of ten 6-pounder guns and 98 86/94 tons (bm) that served from 12 January 1795 to 19 October 1801. In 1799 she was renamed Suworow (or Suwarrow or Soworrow). Reportedly she burned in 1802.
- Hired armed lugger Black Joke was a hired armed lugger of ten 12-pounder carronades and 108 92/94 tons (bm) that entered naval service on 22 May 1808. On 1 July 1810 the French captured Black Joke in the Channel.

These two hired vessels may have been the same. In his narrative of his voyages in the Mediterranean between 1810 and 1814, Charles Robert Cockerell reports that the lugger was an old vessel, having been at the Battle of Camperdown, which is consistent with the earliest mentions of the cutter.

== Other ships ==
- Burla Negra ("Black Joke") was the ship of the pirate Benito de Soto.
- "Black Joke" was also a nickname for the English privateer Liverpool Packet, that operated during the War of 1812, capturing 50 American vessels.
- Furthermore, there was a lugger Black Joke that received a letter of marque on 5 May 1801. She was of 25 tons burthen, had two 2-pounder guns and was under the command of Captain Phillip Dupont.
