= Delima =

Delima may refer to:

- Delima (gastropod), a genus of gastropods in the family Clausiliidae
- Delima, a genus of plants in the family Dilleniaceae, synonym of Tetracera
- Delima, family name, see De Lima
- Delima Silalahi, indonesian environmental activist
