= De Lima =

Lima
- Origin: Portugal
- Distinctions: "de Lima"

de Lima is a Portuguese surname. It is also a Spanish name meaning "Lima". It is also an Indian surname, named for the converts when the Portuguese occupied India.

Delima is a Malay word for pomegranate and is also a family name in the Philippines, Malaysia and Indonesia.

Notable people with the surname include:

- Adriano de Lima (born 1981), Brazilian retired footballer
- Afonso Henriques de Lima Barreto (1881–1922), Brazilian author
- Augusto de Lima (1859–1934), Brazilian journalist
- Frank De Lima (born 1949), American comedian
- Jorge de Lima (1893–1953), Brazilian writer and politician
- Leila de Lima (born 1959), Filipino former senator and Secretary of Justice
- Lilia de Lima, Filipino lawyer
- Ronaldo Luís Nazário de Lima (born 1976), Brazilian footballer
- Sri Delima (born 1936), also known as Adibah Amin, Malaysian writer
- Vanderlei de Lima (born 1969), Brazilian athlete
- Venceslau de Lima (1858–1919), Portuguese geologist, paleontologist, viticulturist and politician
- Vicente de Lima (born 1977), Brazilian athlete

== See also ==
- Ponte de Lima, a municipality in Portugal
- Santa Rosa de Lima (disambiguation), several places with this name
- Universidad de Lima, University of Lima, Peru
- Seri Delima (state constituency) in Penang, Malaysia
- Sri Delima station, in Kuala Lumpur, Malaysia
- DeLima v. Bidwell, U.S. Supreme Court case
- Pengiran Siraja Muda Delima Satu, a neighbourhood in Bandar Seri Begawan, Brunei
- Pancha Delima, Brunei, neighbourhood in Bandar Seri Begawan, Brunei
- Dalima, a genus of moths
- Dilemma (disambiguation)
- Lima (surname)
