= Lima (surname) =

Lima is a Portuguese language surname. Notable people with the name include:

- Adriana Lima (born 1981), Brazilian model
- Adriano Lima (1973–2026), Brazilian Paralympic swimmer
- Ana Clara Lima (born 1997), Brazilian television presenter and reporter
- Antônio Lima dos Santos (1942–2025), known as Lima, Brazilian footballer
- Brian Lima (born 1972), Samoan rugby union player
- Bruno Lima (born 1996), Argentine volleyball player
- Bruno Lima (politician) (born 1986), Brazilian politician
- Cássio Cunha Lima (born 1963), Brazilian lawyer and politician
- Conceição Lima (1961–2026), São Toméan poet
- Daniel Lima (born 1980), Brazilian-Australian professional mixed martial artist
- Devin Lima (1977–2018), American singer, member of the band LFO
- Douglas Lima (born 1988), Brazilian mixed martial artist
- Elon Lages Lima (1929–2017), Brazilian mathematician
- Fernanda Lima (born 1977), Brazilian TV presenter, model and actress
- Fernando Lima (born 1975), Argentine singer
- Floriana Lima (born 1981), American actress
- Francisco Lima (born 1971), footballer
- Francisco Roberto Lima (1917–2008), Salvadoran politician
- Frank De Lima (born 1949), American comedian from Hawaii
- Frank Lima (poet) (1939–2013), American poet
- Gessy Lima (1935–1989), Brazilian footballer
- Guilherme Natan de Lima (born 1999), known as Lima, Brazilian footballer
- Jamie Kern Lima, American entrepreneur, investor, and media personality
- Jeff Lima (rugby league), New Zealand rugby player
- João Maria Lima do Nascimento (born 1982), known as Lima, Brazilian footballer
- José de Barros Lima (1764–1817), Brazilian military
- José de Cerqueira Lima (1794–1839), Brazilian politician and slave trader
- José Inácio Ribeiro de Abreu e Lima, (1768–1817) priest and lawyer killed for his involvement with the Pernambucan revolution
- José Lezama Lima (1910–1976), Cuban novelist, essayist and poet
- José Lima (1972–2010), Dominican baseball player
- José-Filipe Lima (born 1981), Portuguese golfer
- Junior Lima (born 1984), Brazilian singer-songwriter, drummer, guitarist, actor and record producer
- Keit Lima (born 1991), Brazilian lawyer and politician
- Leandro Lima (actor) (born 1982), Brazilian model and actor
- Leandro Lima (footballer, born 1985), Brazilian professional footballer
- Leandro Lima (footballer, born 2001) (2001–2025), Brazilian professional footballer
- Luis Augusto Turcios Lima (1941–1966), Guatemalan army officer and leader of the Rebel Armed Forces
- María Martha Serra Lima (1942–2017), Argentine singer
- Marina Lima (born 1955), Brazilian singer and songwriter
- Maurício Lima (born 1968), Brazilian volleyball player
- Pedro Lima (swimmer) (born 1971), Angolan swimmer
- Pedro Lima (boxer) (born 1983), Brazilian boxer
- Pedro Lima (footballer, born 2003), Brazilian football midfielder
- Pedro Lima (footballer, born 2006), Brazilian football right-back
- Peter Lima, Samoan rugby player
- Ricarda Lima (born 1970), Brazilian volleyball player
- Rodrigo José Lima dos Santos (born 1983), Brazilian footballer
- Rodrigo Lima (fighter) (1991–2019), Brazilian mixed martial artist
- Rodrigo Lima (footballer) (born 1999), Cape Verdean footballer
- Rossy Evelin Lima (born 1989), Mexican-American poet and professor
- Salvatore Lima (1928–1992), Italian politician
- Steven Lima, American politician
- Vanderlei de Lima (born 1969), Brazilian marathon runner
- Venceslau de Lima (1858–1919), Portuguese geologist, paleontologist, viticulturist, and politician
- Vicente Solano Lima (1901–1984), Argentine politician and newspaper publisher, Vice President
- Wilson Lima (born 1976), Brazilian politician and journalist

It is also the main surname of three Brazilian footballers who are better known by other names:

- Daniela Alves Lima (born 1984)
- Ronaldo Luís Nazário de Lima (born 1976)
- Sisleide do Amor Lima (born 1967), better known as Sissi

== See also ==
- de Lima, a composition with the surname Lima
