= Rodrigo Lima =

Rodrigo Lima may refer to:

- Rodrigo Lima (fighter) (born 1991), Brazilian mixed martial artist
- Rodrigo Lima (footballer) (born 1999), Portuguese football midfielder
