= Paulo Lima =

Paulo Lima may refer to:

- Paulo Lima (footballer, born 1992)
- Paulo Lima (footballer, born 1998)
- Paulo Lima (athlete), Brazilian athlete
- Paulo Costa Lima, Brazilian composer and music theorist
- Paulo Lima Amaral, Brazilian footballer and coach

== See also ==
- Paulo Tarso Flecha de Lima, Brazilian diplomat
- Lima (surname)
- Paula Lima, Brazilian singer and composer
