= Silalahi =

Batak surname originating in Indonesia

Silalahi is one of Toba Batak clans originating in North Sumatra, Indonesia. People of this clan bear the clan's name as their surname. Notable people of this clan include:

- Delima Silalahi, Indonesian environmental activist
- Duma Riris Silalahi (born 1983), Indonesian actress, singer, fashion model and a beauty pageant
- Rosianna Silalahi (born 1972), Indonesian news presenter
- Samuel Silalahi (born 2005), Norwegian footballer
- Sudi Silalahi (1949-2021), Indonesian politician and military officer
- T. B. Silalahi (1938-2023), Indonesian politician and military officer
