= Kampong Orang Kaya Besar Imas =

Kampong Orang Kaya Besar Imas Kampung Orang Kaya Besar Imas
- Village
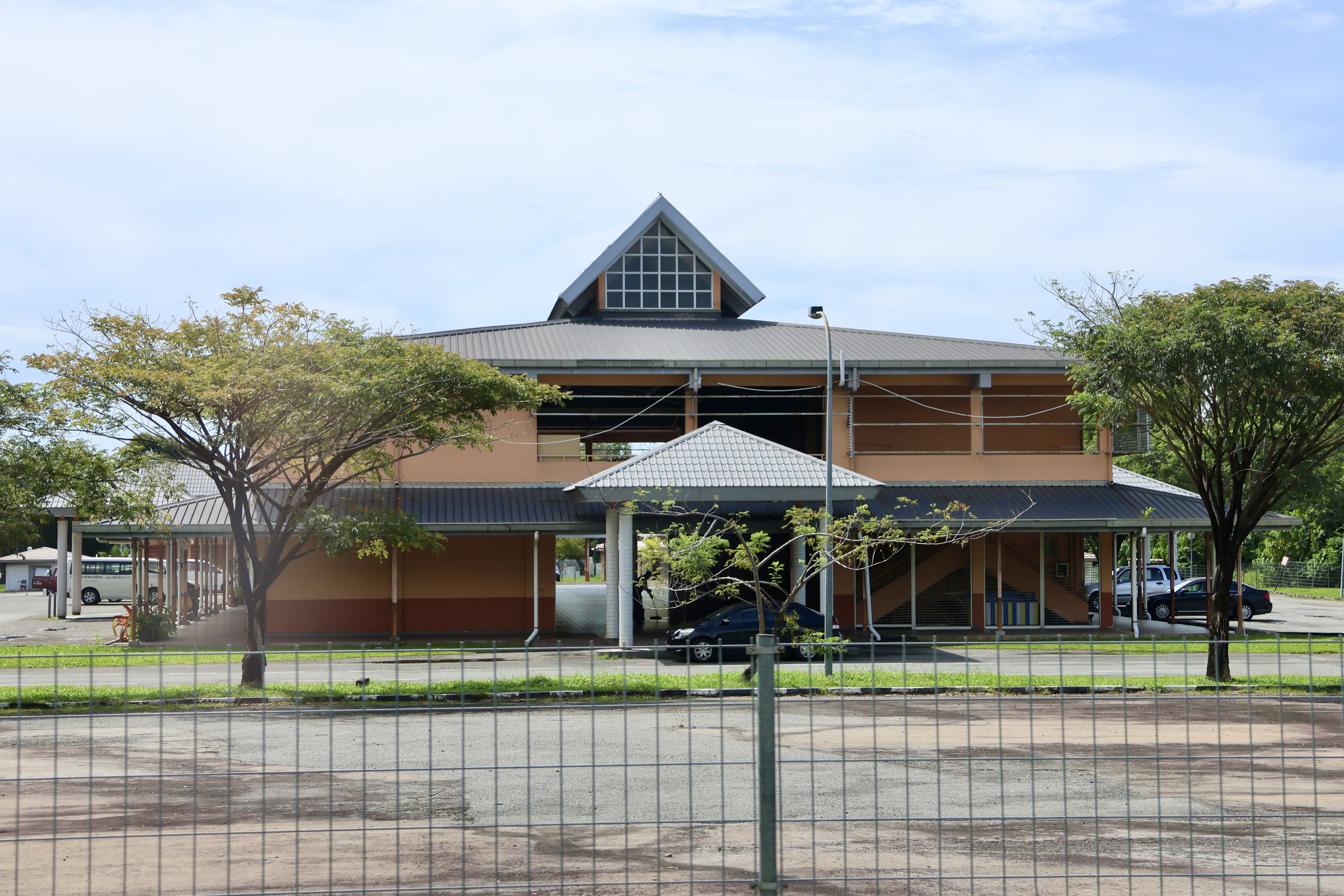
- Commercial building

- Location in Brunei
- Coordinates: 4°56′16″N 114°57′21″E
- Country: Brunei
- District: Brunei-Muara
- Mukim: Berakas 'A'

Population (2016)
  - Total: 1,228
- Time zone: UTC+8 (BNT)
- Postcode: BB4113

Kampong Orang Kaya Besar Imas (commonly abbreviated as OKBI) is a village in Brunei-Muara District, Brunei, and a neighbourhood in the capital Bandar Seri Begawan. The population was 1,228 in 2016. It is one of the villages within Mukim Berakas 'A'. The postcode is BB4113.

== History ==
The village was established in 1954 as one of the areas designated by the government for some of the Kampong Ayer residents to resettle on land under the National Resettlement Programme (Rancangan Perpindahan Negara) in the 1950s.

== Geography ==
The village is located in the central part of Brunei-Muara District. It is one of the neighbourhoods in Bandar Seri Begawan, the capital of Brunei. It is contiguous with the neighbourhoods of Pengiran Siraja Muda to the north, Sungai Akar to the east, Pulaie to the south, Anggerek Desa to the west and Pancha Delima to the north-west.

== Administration ==
The village has been part of Bandar Seri Begawan's municipal area since the expansion of the municipality's spatial jurisdiction in 2007.
