= Admiral Ramsay =

Admiral Ramsay may refer to:

- Alexander Ramsay (Royal Navy officer) (1881–1972), British Royal Navy admiral
- Bertram Ramsay (1883–1945), British Royal Navy admiral
- Charles Ramsey (Royal Navy officer) (1882–1966), British Royal Navy admiral
- DeWitt Clinton Ramsey (1888–1961), U.S. Navy admiral
- Francis Munroe Ramsay (1835–1914), U.S. Navy rear admiral
- George Ramsay, 12th Earl of Dalhousie (1806–1880), British Royal Navy admiral
- William Ramsay (Royal Navy officer) (1796–1871), British Royal Navy rear admiral
