= Keit Lima =

Brazilian lawyer and politician

- Lima in 2026

Member-elect of the Legislative Assembly of São Paulo
- Incumbent
- Assumed office 15 March 2027

Member of the Municipal Chamber of São Paulo
- Incumbent
- Assumed office 1 January 2025

Personal details
- Born: Keitchele Lima da Silva; 8 April 1991 (age 35) Recife, Pernambuco, Brazil
- Party: PSOL
- Education: Faculdade Zumbi dos Palmares; Faculdades Integradas Campos Salles
- Profession: Business administrator; Lawyer
- Website: keitlima.com.br

Keitchele Lima da Silva, also known as Keit Lima (April 8, 1991), is a Brazilian business executive, lawyer, and politician affiliated with the Socialism and Liberty Party (PSOL).

== Biography ==
Keit was born in Recife, the capital of the state of Pernambuco, in 1991. She moved to São Paulo, to the Brasilândia neighborhood, where she earned a degree in business administration from Faculdade Zumbi dos Palmares (FAZP) and a law degree from Faculdades Integradas Campos Salles.

A member of the Socialism and Liberty Party (PSOL), she ran for city councilor in São Paulo in the 2020 municipal election, but was not elected. In 2022, she ran for state representative on the PSOL ticket, receiving more than 35,000 votes but failing to win a seat. In 2024, she ran again for city councilor in São Paulo. After receiving more than 27,000 votes, she was elected to the position. In 2026, she ran again for the position of state representative in São Paulo. She was elected and secured one of PSOL’s nine seats in the Legislative Assembly of São Paulo (Alesp).

Electoral performance

Year	Position	Party	Votes	Result	Ref.
2020	City councillor of São Paulo	PSOL	11,355	Not elected	
2022	State deputy from São Paulo	PSOL	36,767	Not elected	
2024	City councillor of São Paulo	PSOL	27,769	Elected	
2026	State deputy from São Paulo	PSOL	58,984	Elected	

== Personal life ==
Keit is an evangelical Christian. She identifies as bisexual.
