= Black Joke =

18th-century bawdy English song

The Black Joke, sometimes spelled Black Joak, was a bawdy song heard in London around 1730. William Hogarth referenced the song in the Tavern Scene of A Rake's Progress. Grose's dictionary of the vulgar tongue notes that the refrain of the song was "Her black joke and belly so white", with "black joke" referring to female genitalia. Historical fiction writer Patrick O'Brian, in Master and Commander (the first of his 21-novel Napoleonic War series, originally published in 1969), referenced the ditty being sung aboard a sloop, the Sophie, that—in this fictional account—was in the service of the Royal Navy in 1800. The lyrics and tune apparently gave rise to variations from 1730 onwards, such as the White Joak and so forth. The tune was later known as The Sprig of Shillelagh. Thomas Moore (1779–1852) wrote the song "Sublime was the warning which Liberty spoke" to the tune.

Muzio Clementi wrote "Black Joke for keyboard in C maj" with 21 variations in 1777 (published 1780). In 1913 Cecil Sharp, Herbert MacIlwaine and George Butterworth published "Morris Dance Tunes" set 2, containing the tune "Black Joke". Sharp had collected the tune in April 1912 from Michael Handy, a dancer with Ilmington Morris. In 1976 John Kirkpatrick recorded it on the album "Plain Capers" (Topic TSCD458).

== Vessels ==
- During the French Revolutionary and Napoleonic Wars, the Royal Navy employed several hired armed cutters that bore the name Black Joke.
- During the War of 1812, Black Joke was a nickname for the highly successful Nova Scotian privateer Liverpool Packet.
- In 1827 the British captured the slave ship Henriquetta and renamed her HMS Black Joke. She went on to become one of the most successful anti-slavery vessels in the West Africa or "Preventative squadron".
