= José de Cerqueira Lima =

Brazilian merchant and slave trader (1794–1839)

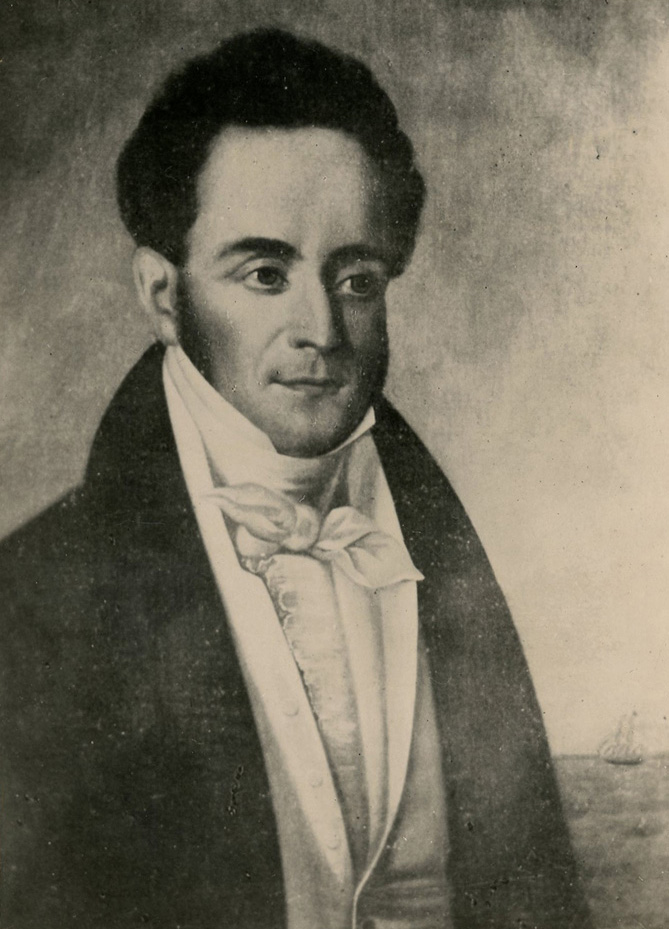
- Born: 1794; Salvador, State of Brazil
- Died: 1839 (aged 44–45); Salvador, Empire of Brazil
- Occupations: Merchant, slave trader, politician
- Known for: Owner of the slave ship HMS Black Joke; largest slave trader in early 19th-century Bahia
- Spouse: Carlota Maria José de Figueiroa Nabuco de Araújo (m. 1817)

José de Cerqueira Lima (1794–1839) was a Brazilian merchant, slave trader and politician based in Salvador da Bahia. He was one of the wealthiest and most prominent slave traders operating in Brazil during the 1820s and 1830s, owning a fleet of at least a dozen slaving vessels. He is best known as the owner of the Henriqueta, a notorious slave ship that was captured by the Royal Navy in 1827 and subsequently converted into HMS Black Joke, one of the most successful anti-slavery patrol vessels in history.

== Career in the slave trade ==
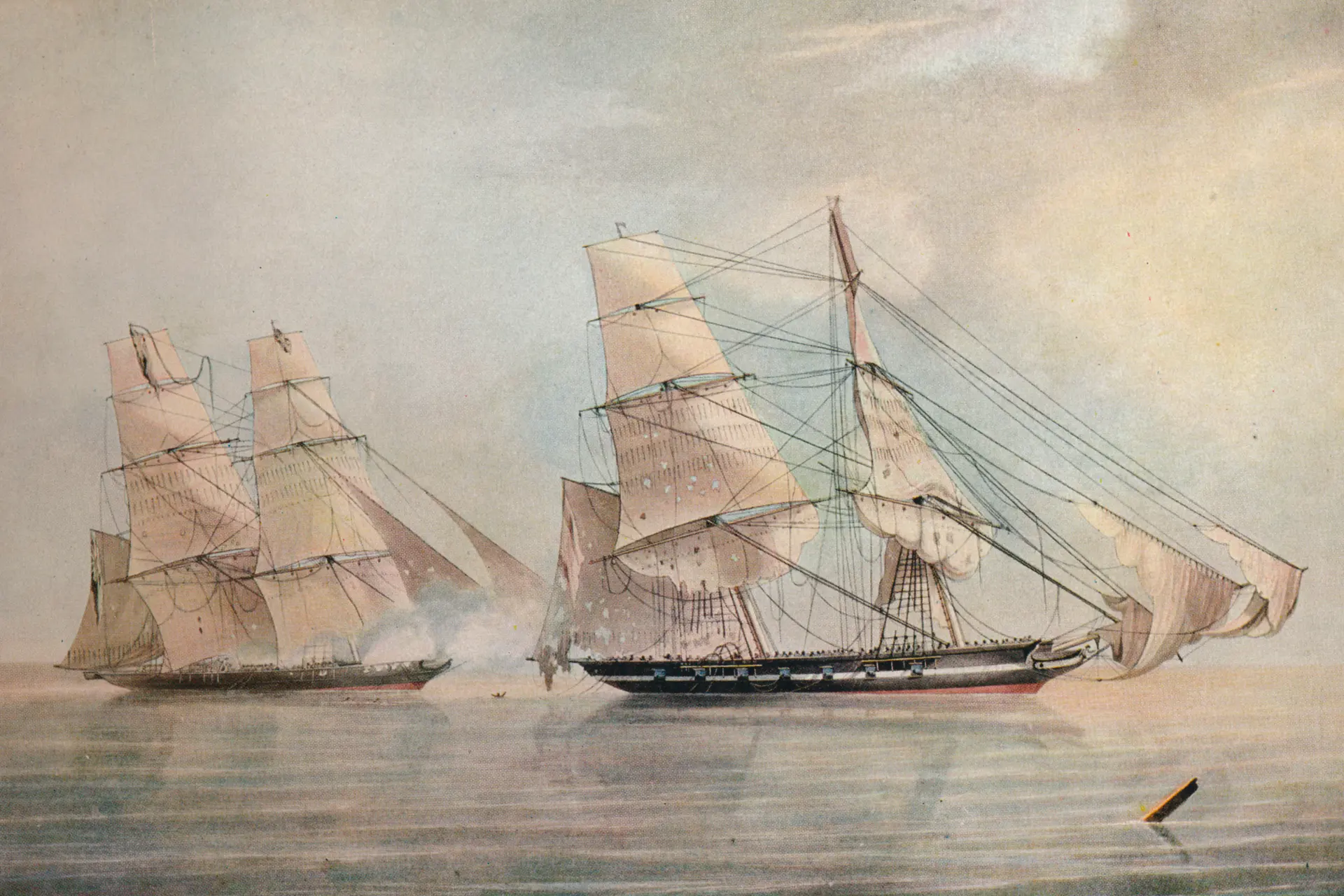
HMS Black Joke (formerly Henriqueta) engaging the Spanish slave brig El Almirante

Cerqueira Lima was born in 1794 in the parish of Conceição, Salvador. His father, José de Cerqueira Lima, was a Portuguese-born slave trader who had settled in the city, which was the capital of the sugar-producing province of Bahia in northeastern Brazil and one of the largest slave-importing regions in the Americas. His mother was Maria Vitória Carolina de Vasconcelos e Sousa. He built a commercial empire centred on the transatlantic slave trade, acquiring a fleet of at least a dozen vessels dedicated to trafficking enslaved Africans from the Bight of Benin to Brazil.

Contemporary British authorities considered Cerqueira Lima one of the most important slave traders operating from Bahia. The British Foreign Office and Parliament ranked him alongside other major figures such as the Rios brothers, Antônio Pedroso de Albuquerque, and Francisco Félix de Souza, the notorious slave trader of Ouidah. Beyond the Henriqueta, Cerqueira Lima owned other slaving vessels, including the brig Bahia, which was captured in 1827 near Agoué (in present-day Benin) with enslaved people on board. His most renowned vessel was the Henriqueta (also spelled Henriquetta), a Baltimore clipper built in the United States, possibly originally named the Griffin. The ship was purchased in 1825 and was noted for its exceptional speed and manoeuvrability, qualities that made it well suited to evading British naval patrols enforcing the ban on the slave trade.

Under the command of captain João Cardozo dos Santos, the Henriqueta made at least six voyages from the Bight of Benin to Salvador between 1825 and 1827. In total, the ship delivered over 3,000 enslaved Africans to Bahia during this period, generating profits of approximately £80,000 for Cerqueira Lima. Although the slave trade had been rendered illegal through treaties imposed under British pressure, first under Portuguese rule and then by independent Brazil, Cerqueira Lima and other powerful traders continued their operations openly. He was wealthy and influential enough to insure his ships specifically against capture by the Royal Navy, with policies issued by insurers in Rio de Janeiro.

=== Capture of the Henriqueta ===
On the night of 6 September 1827, the Henriqueta was intercepted by HMS Sybille off Lagos in the Bight of Benin while carrying 569 enslaved Africans. Unable to outrun the larger British frigate, the Henriqueta was forced to surrender. The enslaved people on board were freed and registered as Liberated Africans in Freetown, Sierra Leone. The ship was condemned as a slaver, sold at auction for £330, and purchased into Royal Navy service. Renamed HMS Black Joke after a popular bawdy song of the era, the vessel went on to capture at least 13 slave ships and free over 3,000 enslaved people before being decommissioned and burned in 1832.

He died in 1839.

== Political career ==
Despite his involvement in the illegal slave trade, Cerqueira Lima held public office in Bahia. He served as a city councillor (vereador) in Salvador around 1827. In 1835, he was elected as a provincial deputy for Bahia and served as vice-director of the Companhia de Colonização da Bahia (Bahia Colonization Company), a venture established to attract European settlers to the province. The company was launched in November 1835 at the Santa Teresa convent in Salvador, with Cerqueira Lima serving alongside the director, the politician Calmon, and other prominent figures. The venture, however, was plagued by financial difficulties and complaints from colonists, and was eventually dissolved.

== Personal life ==
Cerqueira Lima was described as one of the richest and most influential men of his era in the province of Bahia. He was wealthy enough to lend furniture and his gold tableware to host Emperor Pedro II and the imperial family during their visit to the province.

He married Carlota Maria José de Figueiroa Nabuco de Araújo on 19 April 1817. One of the wedding witnesses was Felisberto Caldeira Brant Pontes, who would later become the Marquess of Barbacena.

His son, José Cerqueira de Aguiar Lima (6 March 1828, Salvador – 20 December 1898, Rio de Janeiro), was born in the parish of Vitória in Salvador. The younger Cerqueira Lima rejected his father's involvement in the slave trade, which caused a rift between them. He pursued a military career, eventually rising to the rank of brigadier general. He served as the first provisional governor of Pernambuco following the Proclamation of the Republic in 1889, and later served briefly as governor of Paraná (December 1890 to June 1891).

== See also ==
- Atlantic slave trade
- Slavery in Brazil
- West Africa Squadron
