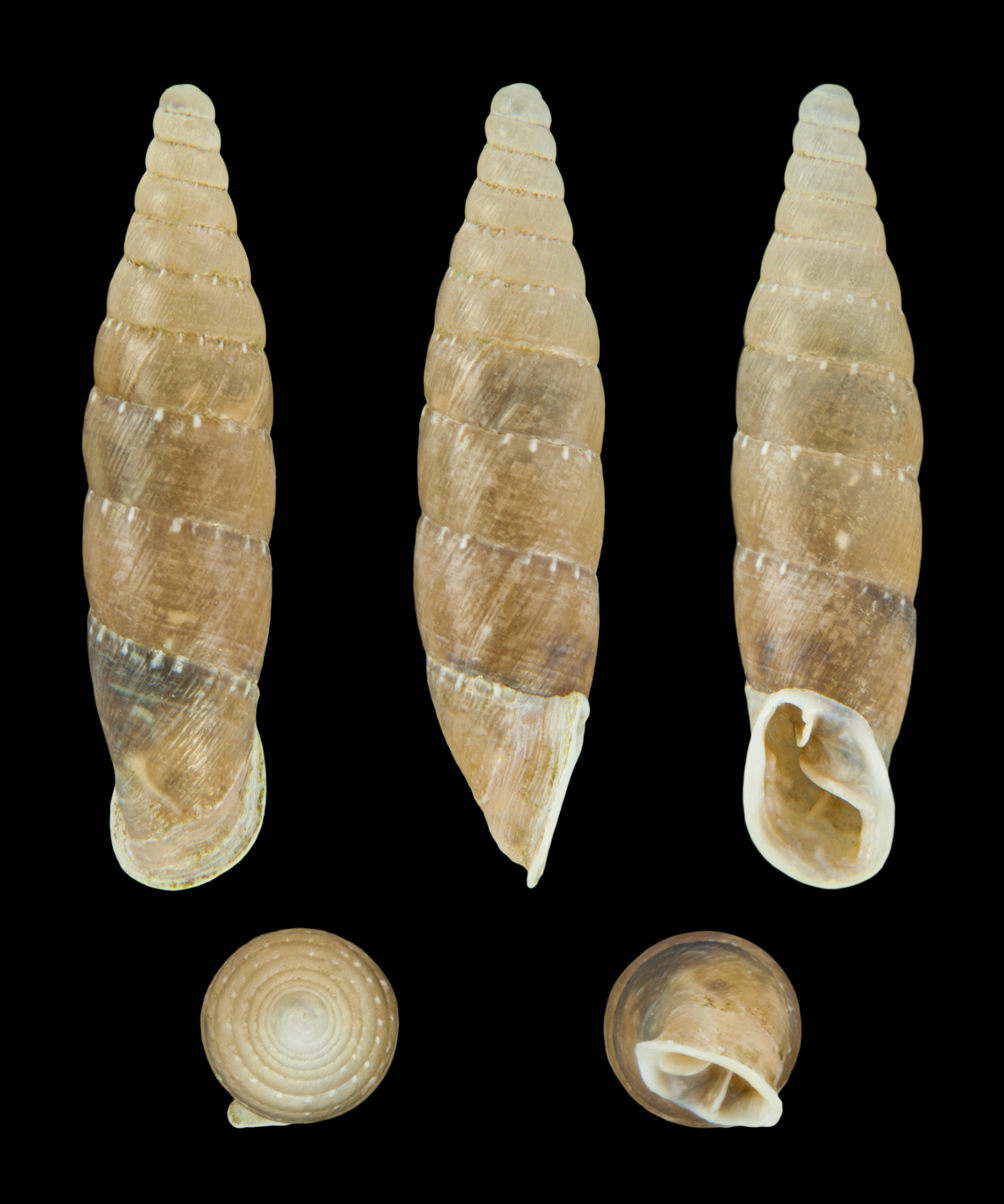

Scientific classification
- Kingdom: Animalia
- Phylum: Mollusca
- Class: Gastropoda
- Order: Stylommatophora
- Family: Clausiliidae
- Genus: Delima; Hartmann, 1842

= Delima (gastropod) =

Genus of land snails

Delima is a genus of gastropods belonging to the family Clausiliidae.

The species of this genus are found in Europe, Western Asia.

Species:

- Delima albocincta (L.Pfeiffer, 1841)
- Delima amoena (L.Pfeiffer, 1848)
- Delima bilabiata (J.A.Wagner, 1829)
- Delima binotata (Rossmässler, 1836)
- Delima blanda (Rossmässler, 1836)
- Delima edmibrani Štamol & Slapnik, 2002
- Delima giselae A.J.Wagner, 1914
- Delima helenae (Küster, 1876)
- Delima hiltrudis H.Nordsieck, 1969
- Delima laevissima (Rossmässler, 1833)
- Delima latilabris (J.A.Wagner, 1829)
- Delima montenegrina (L.Pfeiffer, 1848)
- Delima pachystoma (L.Pfeiffer, 1848)
- Delima pellucida (L.Pfeiffer, 1848)
- Delima pfeifferi (Küster, 1850)
- Delima semirugata (Rossmässler, 1836)
- Delima subcylindrica (Rossmässler, 1836)
- Delima vidovichii (L.Pfeiffer, 1846)
