= Santa Rosa de Lima =

Santa Rosa de Lima (the name of Rose of Lima, the first American Roman Catholic saint) could refer to:

- Santa Rosa de Lima, Santa Catarina, Brazil
- Santa Rosa de Lima, Sergipe, Brazil
- Santa Rosa de Lima, La Unión, El Salvador
- Santa Rosa de Lima, Santa Rosa, Guatemala
- Santa Rosa de Lima, Guanajuato, Mexico
- Santa Rosa de Lima, New Mexico, USA, ruins near Abiquiu

== See also ==
- Santa Rosa (disambiguation)
- Saint Rose (disambiguation)
