= William Ramsay (Royal Navy officer) =

Scottish Royal Navy rear-admiral (1796–1871)

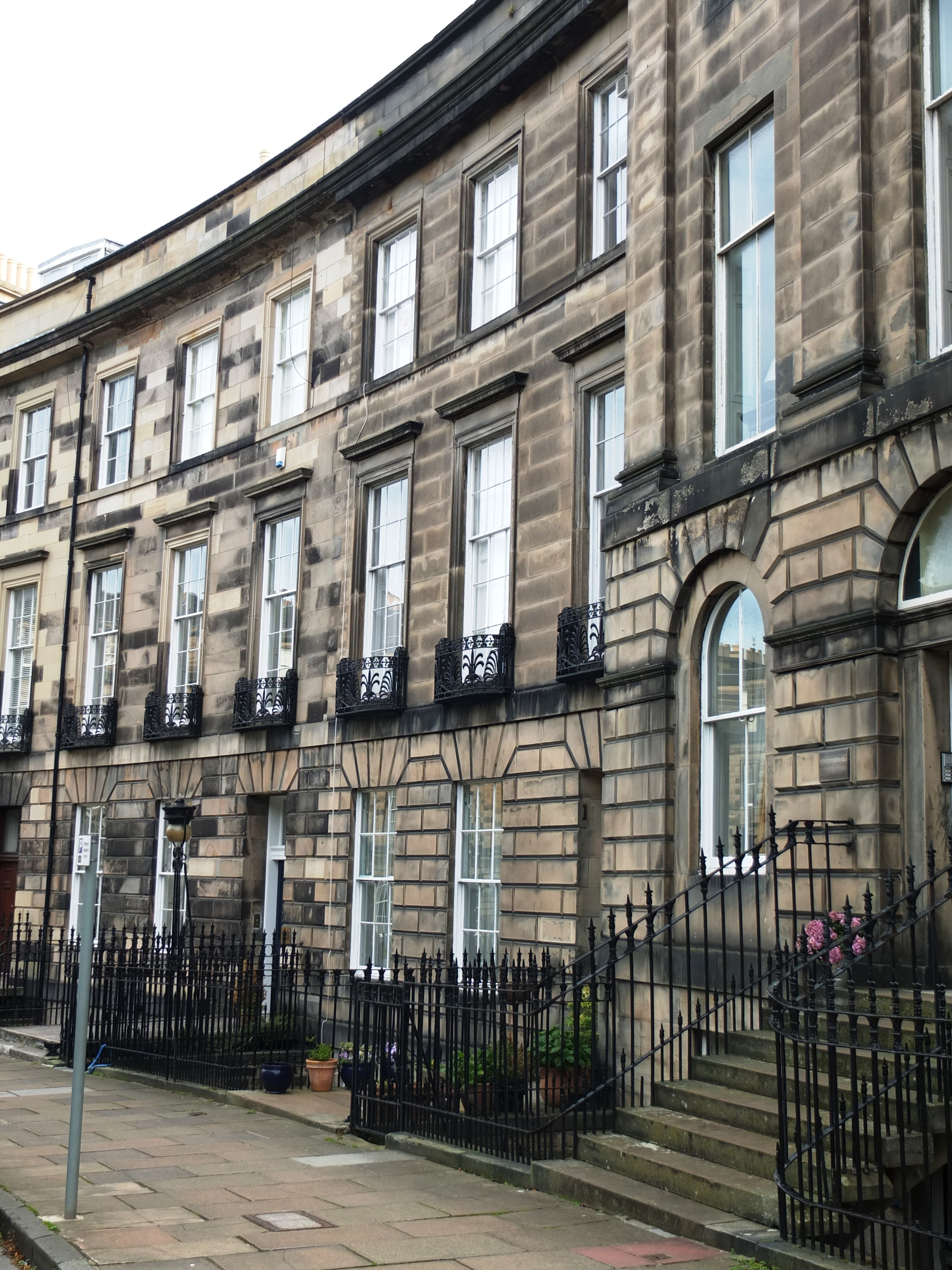
23 Ainslie Place, Edinburgh

Rear-Admiral Sir William Ramsay KCB (born Burnett; 27 May 1796 – 3 December 1871) was a Scottish admiral in the Royal Navy.

== Early life and family ==
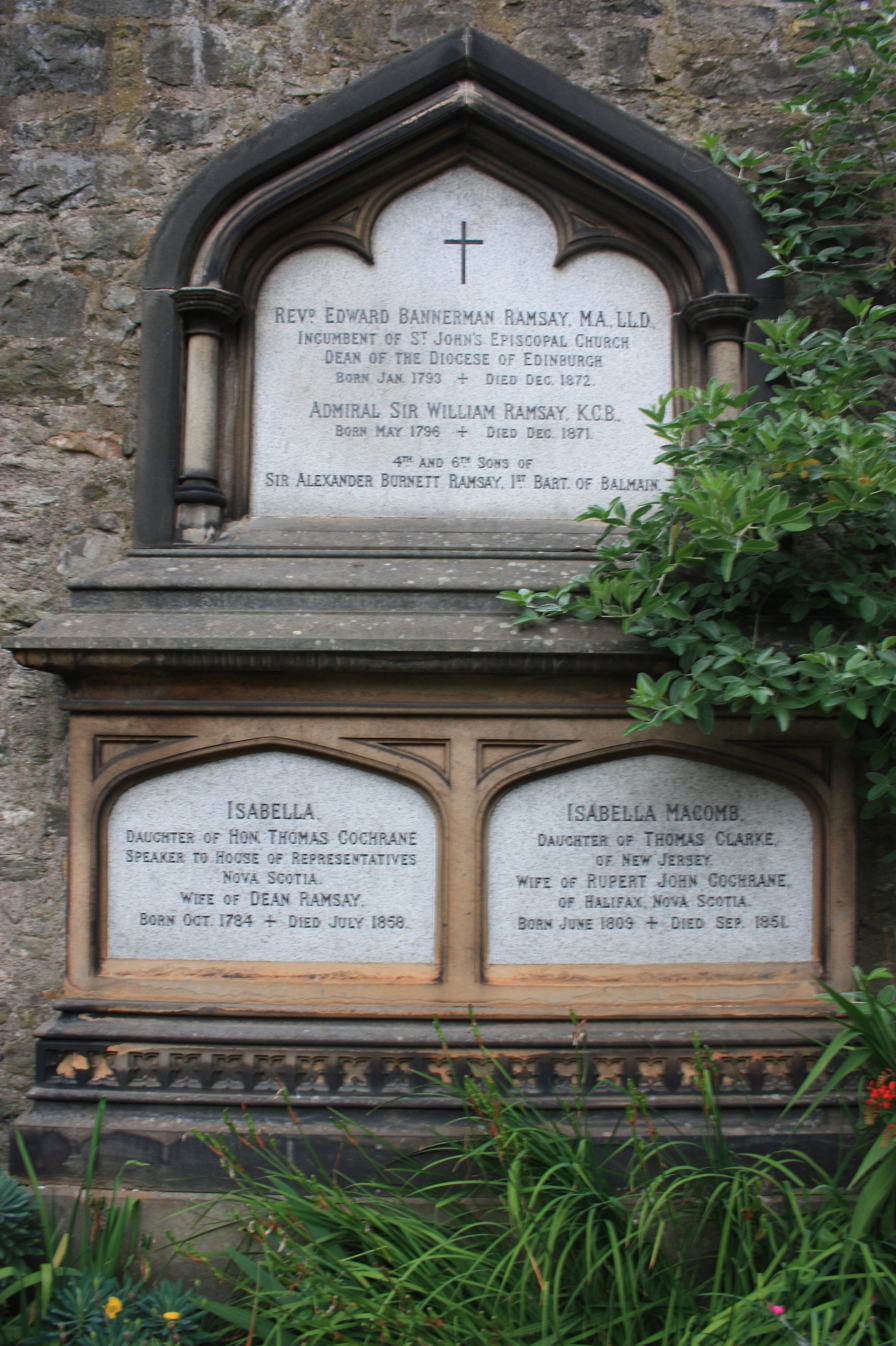
The grave of Admiral Sir William Ramsay and Dean Ramsay, St John's Episcopal Church, Edinburgh

Ramsay was born at Balmain House in Aberdeenshire, the sixth son of Alexander Burnett (later known as Sir Alexander Ramsay, 1st Baronet of Balmain), and his wife, Elizabeth Bannerman, daughter of Sir Alexander Bannerman, 4th Baronet. Alexander Burnett was the second son of Catherine Ramsay, the granddaughter of Sir Charles Ramsay, 3rd Baronet of Balmain of an earlier creation (1625) in the Baronetage of Nova Scotia, which was inherited by Catherine's brother Alexander. Catherine Ramsay married Sir Thomas Burnett of Leys, 6th Baronet and their elder son, Robert, inherited the Burnett baronetcy. Catherine's brother Alexander, the 6th Baronet, died without sons in 1806 (though two relatives styled themselves as the next baronet, without proving parentage), at which point the Nova Scotia baronetcy either became extinct or dormant. In 1806, Sir Alexander Ramsay, 6th Baronet bequeathed his estates to his nephew Alexander Burnett. The baronetcy was revived in favour of Burnett a few months after Sir Alexander's death, who changed the family surname to Ramsay.

His elder brothers included Sir Alexander Ramsay, 2nd Baronet of Balmain and Dean Edward Ramsay, leader of the Scottish Episcopal Church.

== Career ==
He entered the Royal Navy in 1809. He became a Lieutenant in 1821. From 1829 to 1831 he commanded HMS Black Joke. During his command Black Joke chased, boarded, and captured the larger Spanish slave ship Marinerito, freeing over 400 slaves. He became a Commander in 1831 and a captain in 1838. His main command was HMS Terrible, a uniquely profiled paddle steamer with two pairs of funnels. He joined the ship from its initial launch at Woolwich Dockyard in 1845. He then joined the Channel Squadron. In 1847 he was put to special duties on a new ship, HMS Dragon, conveying food to Ireland during the Great Famine, before returning to HMS Terrible for duties in the Mediterranean. In 1852 he joined HMS Hogue, first in its duties as a guard ship at Devonport then on duties in the Baltic Sea during the Crimean War.

He was made Rear Admiral in 1857 and retired with the rank of Vice Admiral in 1866. Queen Victoria created him a Knight Commander of the Order of the Bath (KCB) in June 1869.

He retired to live with his brother Dean Ramsay at 23 Ainslie Place on the Moray Estate in west Edinburgh.

He died unmarried on 3 December 1871, aged 75. He is buried with his brother in the eastern enclosure of St John's Episcopal Church, Edinburgh (on Princes Street). Some references place him in the immediately adjacent churchyard: St Cuthberts.
