= Kampong Pancha Delima =

- Village
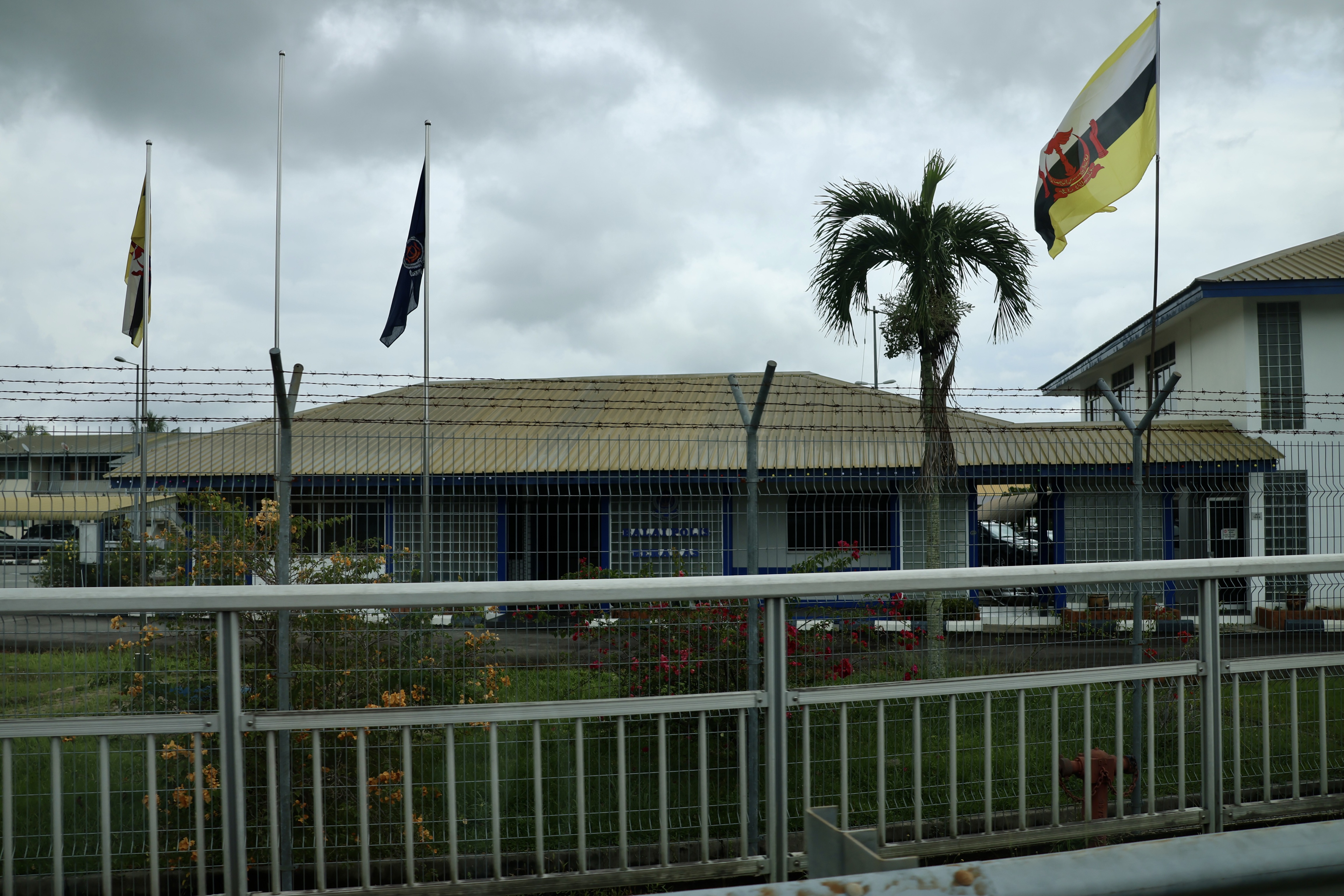
- Berakas Police Station

- Location in Brunei
- Coordinates: 4°56′27″N 114°56′48″E
- Country: Brunei
- District: Brunei-Muara
- Mukim: Berakas 'A'

Government
  - Village head: Omar Safar

Population (2016)
  - Total: 1,562
- Time zone: UTC+8 (BNT)
- Postcode: BB4513

Kampong Pancha Delima is a village in Brunei-Muara District, Brunei, and a neighbourhood in the capital Bandar Seri Begawan. The population was 1,562 in 2016. It is one of the villages within Mukim Berakas 'A'. The postcode is BB4513.

== Geography ==
The village is located in the central part of Brunei-Muara District. It is one of the neighbourhoods in the capital Bandar Seri Begawan and contiguous with the residential neighbourhoods of Pengiran Siraja Muda to the east, Orang Kaya Besar Imas to the south-east and Anggerek Desa to the south.

== History ==
Pancha Delima was one of the areas designated by the government of Brunei for the relocation of Kampong Ayer residents to resettle on land, under the National Resettlement Scheme in the 1950s. The residents of Pancha Delima who were under the relocation programme resettled in the area in 1958 and they originally came from the Kampong Ayer neighbourhoods of Sumbiling Lama and Sultan Lama.

== Administration ==
Since 2007, the village has become part of Bandar Seri Begawan's municipality with the expansion of its spatial jurisdiction.
