= Faculdade Zumbi dos Palmares =

Non-profit private college in Sao Paulo, SP Brazil

Coordinates: 23°31′14″S 46°37′49″W

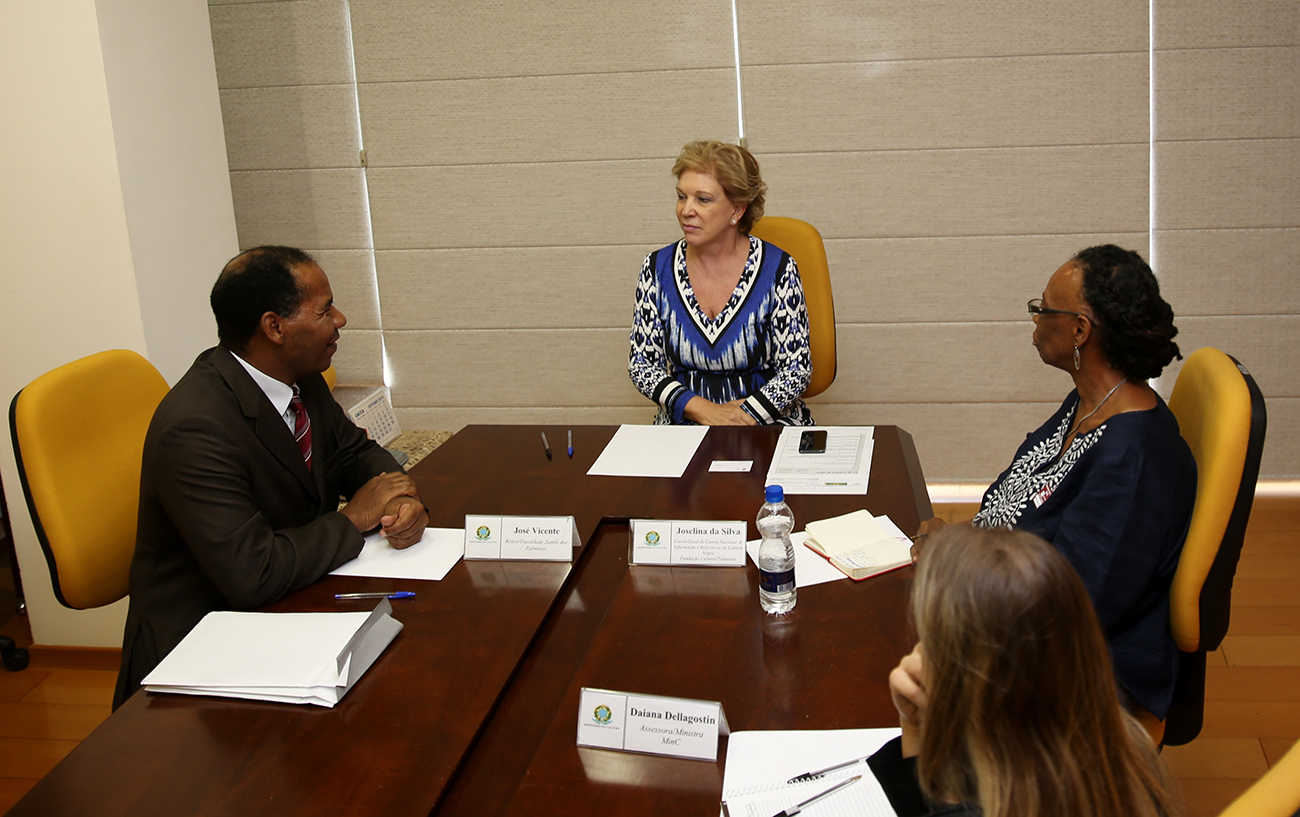

Faculdade Zumbi dos Palmares, also known as Unipalmares or FAZP, is a private educational institution in the Ponte Pequena neighborhood in São Paulo. Founded in 2004 and named after Zumbi (the leader of the Palmares quilombo), it is the only institution of higher education in Brazil to focus primarily on attracting Afro-Brazilians and teach an Afro-Brazilian-focused curriculum. One of the objectives of the faculty would be to reduce the inequality between blacks and whites in higher education, since in Brazil, only 13.3% of students in higher education are black, according to data from the 2012 Census of Higher Education. In 2012 accounted for 1,600 enrolled students and 1,400 graduates.

== See also ==
- Historically black colleges and universities in the United States
