= HMS Black Joke =

UK naval anti-slavery brig (1827–1832)

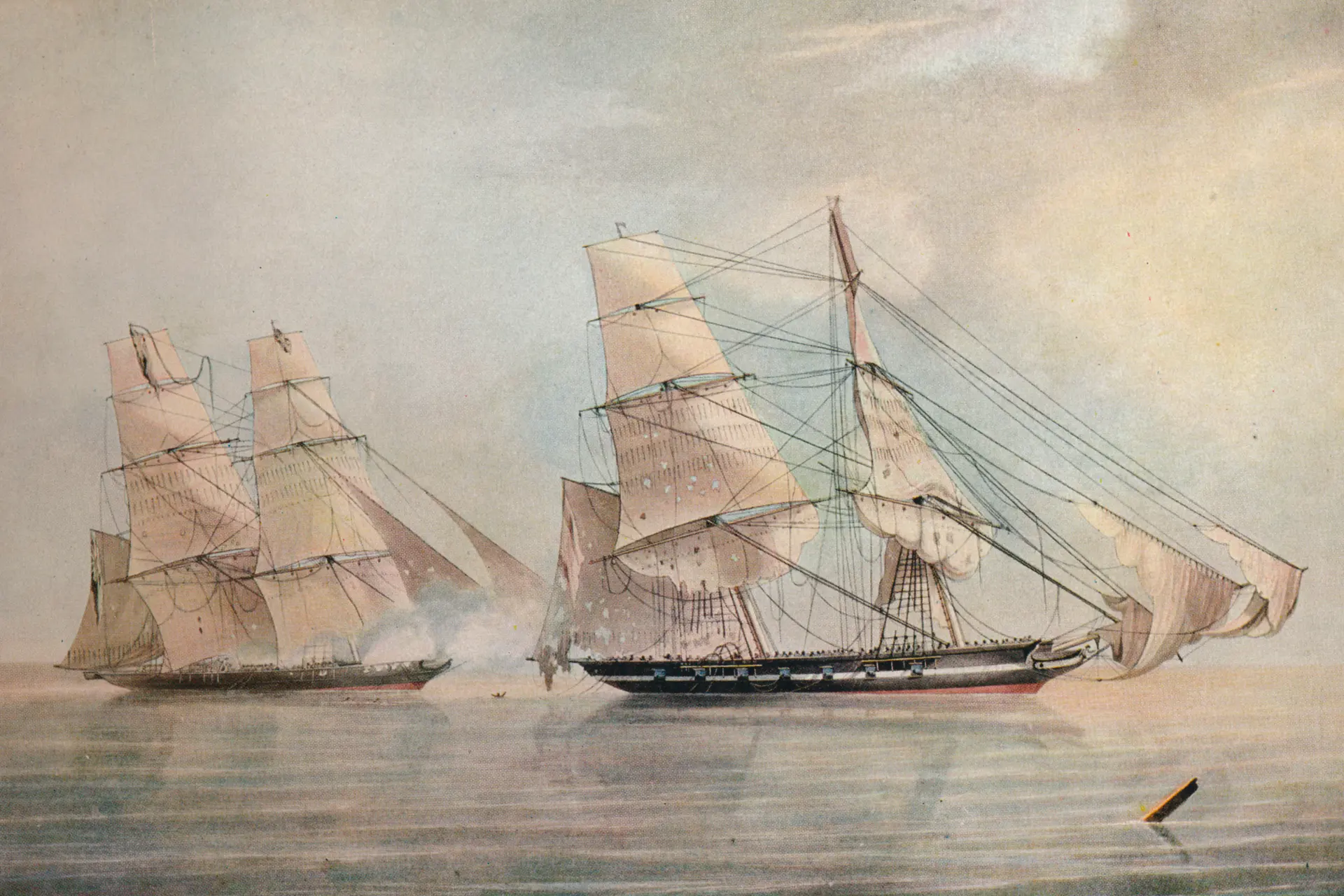
- Black Joke (left) firing on the Spanish slave ship El Almirante on 1 February 1829

History

Brazil
- Name: Henriquetta
- Owner: José de Cerqueira Lima
- Builder: Baltimore
- Launched: 1824?
- Acquired: 1825
- Fate: Captured by the Royal Navy in 1827

United Kingdom
- Name: HMS Black Joke
- Namesake: Black Joke (bawdy song)
- Acquired: Captured 1827
- Commissioned: 1827
- Decommissioned: May 1832
- Fate: Burnt on orders from London

General characteristics
- Class & type: Baltimore clipper
- Tons burthen: Approx. 260 ton (bm)
- Length: 90 ft 10 in (27.7 m)
- Beam: 26 ft 7 in (8.1 m)
- Sail plan: Brig
- Complement: 34 sailors & 5 marines
- Armament: One pivot-mounted 18-pounder gun

Service record
- Part of: West Africa Squadron
- Commanders: 1827–1828 Lt. William Turner; 1828–1829 Lt. Henry Downes; 1829–1832 Lt. William Ramsay

HMS Black Joke was a cutter, probably built in Baltimore in 1824, originally launched as the Brazilian slave ship Henriquet[t]a. The Royal Navy captured her in September 1827, and purchased her into the service. The Navy renamed her Black Joke, after an English song of the same name, and assigned her to the West Africa Squadron (or Preventive Squadron). Her role was to chase down slave ships, and over her five-year career, she freed thousands of slaves. The Navy deliberately burnt her in May 1832 because her timbers had rotted to the point that she was no longer fit for active service.

== Henriquetta – slaver ==
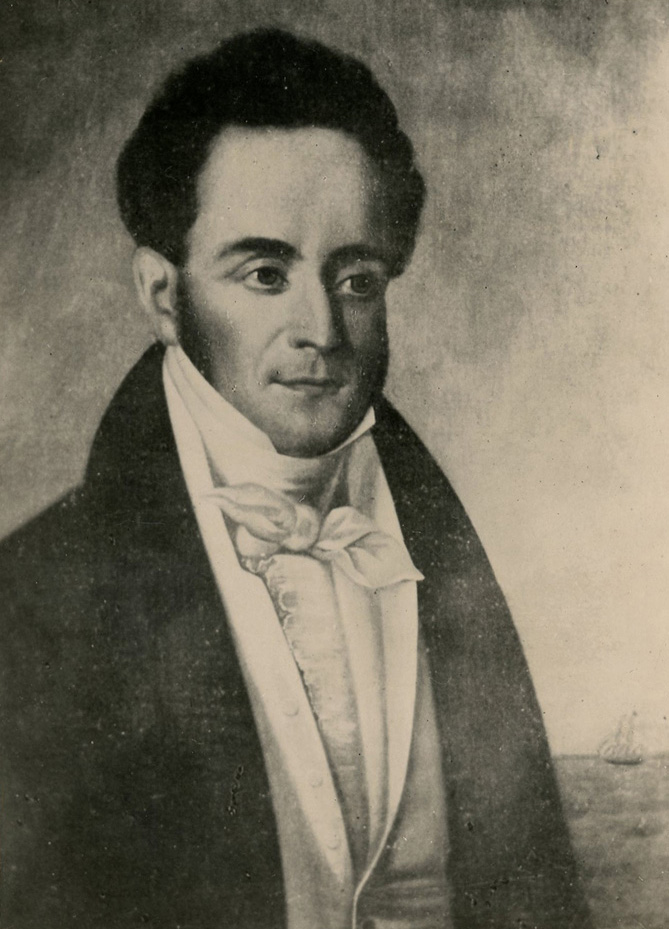
Henriqueta's owner José de Cerqueira Lima

Built as a Baltimore clipper (possibly as the vessel Griffen), Henriquetta (also Henriqueta or Henri Quatre) was a brig designed to be fast. Brazilian owners purchased her in 1825, and she worked for José de Cerqueira Lima, a slave dealer at Bahia, making £80,000 (about £6,460,000 in 2025, when adjusted for inflation), by running 3,040 slaves across to Brazil in six voyages over a period of three years. Cerqueira Lima was the richest man in Bahia and owned another 16 slave ships. Henriquetta's captain was João Cardozo dos Santos.

HMS Sybille captured her on 6 September 1827. Commodore Francis Collier of Sybille wrote to the Admiralty noting that at the time of her capture, Henriquetta was 257 tons, mounted three guns, and had a crew of 38 men. She had 569 enslaved Africans on board "and had landed at Bahia 3,360 slaves in the last two years".

She was sold at auction in Sierra Leone on 5 January 1828, for £330 (roughly £31,000 in 2025). (Note: For captured slave ships in this time, bounty money was based on the number of slaves freed, not on the value of the ship, which became government property. A first-class share of the bounty money, i.e., the amount accruing to Collier, was £1946 13s 10 1/2d; a sixth-class share, that of an ordinary seaman, was worth £5 9s 11 1/4d.)

== Black Joke – slaver catcher ==
The Navy took her into service as a tender to Sybille, under the command of Lieutenant William Turner of Sybille. During her service with the Navy, Black Joke's crew included an assistant surgeon, three midshipmen, thirty seamen, and five marines, as well as a number of Liberian Kroomen for use on detached boat service. Her armament consisted of one long 18-pounder on a pivot mount. (Note: Some accounts give her two guns, but do not specify their type.)

On 5 January 1828, she sailed with Sybille and the 20-gun post ship HMS Esk. On 12 January, she captured the Spanish schooner Gertrudes (or Gertrudis), which carried 155 slaves. (Note: A first-class share of the bounty money was worth £393 4s 8 1/2d; a sixth-class share was worth £1 9s 9 3/4d.) Gertrudes had outrun the other two British warships, but not Black Joke.

On 2 April, a Spanish 14-gun brig fired on Black Joke as she approached the brig. After two hours of exchanging shots, and after suffering several casualties, the brig hoisted a flag of truce. She turned out to be the Providentia, of 14 guns and a crew of 80 men. She had fired on the Black Joke as Providentia's captain had been warned that a Colombian privateer answering to the same description as Black Joke was in the area. Turner, therefore, released her. Black Joke suffered no casualties; Providentia had numerous of her crew killed and wounded.

On 1 May 1828, Black Joke fought the large and well-armed pirate Presidenté from Buenos Aires. After two hours of action, and following the death of their captain and two others, as well as the wounding of a number more, the crew of the Presidenté sought a truce. (Black Joke sustained one killed and a number wounded.) The crew of Presidenté underwent an examination before being committed for trial on charges of piracy. Many of her crew appeared to be British or have anglicized names, and they were sent back to England for trial. The next day, Black Joke retook the Portuguese vessel Hosse, which Presidenté had taken as a prize. Presidente was lost at sea on her way to Sierra Leone, but Black Joke earned salvage money for Hosse. (Note: A first-class share of the bounty money was worth £337 17s 10 1/2d; a sixth-class share was worth £1 7s 5 1/4d.)

On 16 May, Black Joke captured Vengador. She had a crew of 45 men and eight guns, but offered no resistance. She carried 645 slaves, the most ever captured on a single ship. (Note: A first-class share of the bounty money was worth £1496 12s 5d; a sixth-class share was worth £5 16s 1 1/2d.)

On 14 September, Black Joke was in company with HMS Primrose when Primrose captured the Zephirina or Zephorina. Zephorina was carrying 218 slaves. (Note: A first-class share of the bounty money was worth £647 9s 3d; a sixth-class share was worth £3 12s 6d.)

On 14 November, Turner received promotion to commander. He turned over command of Black Joke to Lieutenant Henry Downes of Sybille. In November of the same year, Black Joke was forced to leave the coast of Bioko (Fernando Po), due to fever on board.

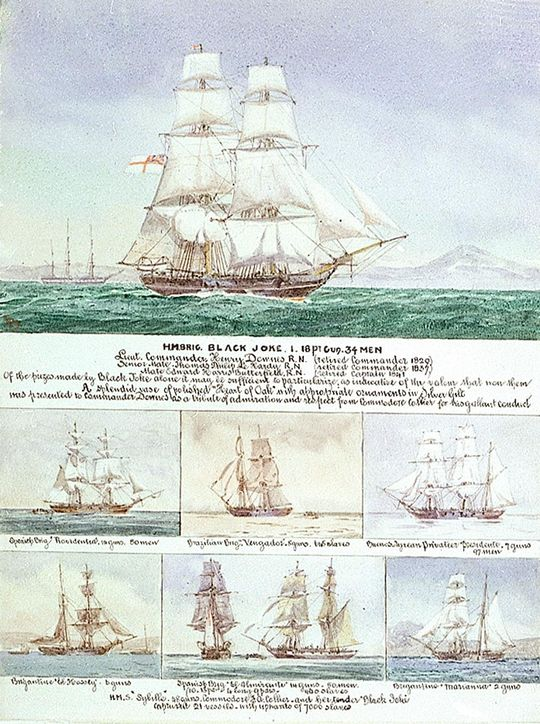
HMS Black Joke and prizes (clockwise from top left) Spanish brig Providentia, Brazilian brig Vengador, Buenos Ayrean privateer Presidente, brigantine El Hassey, Spanish brig El Almirante, and brigantine Marianna

In late January 1829, Black Joke witnessed a Spanish brig load slaves before setting sail for Havana. Black Joke chased the brig for 31 hours, and on 1 February, when the wind dropped, resorted to sweeps to bring herself within gunshot of her prey. El Almirante mounted a total of 14 guns (10 Gover's 18-pounder cannon and four long 9-pounders) and had a crew of 80 men. (Note: John Gover designed a new type of gun carriage in the late 1790s or early 1800s that enabled the guns to be handled by smaller gun crews and the guns to be stored alongside the rails rather than perpendicular to them.) Black Joke was almost half the size of El Almirante and mounted two guns. Good ship-handling, the discipline of Black Joke's gun crew, and light winds gave Downes the advantage. In 80 minutes, he defeated and captured the slaver, which suffered 15 dead, including her captain and first and second mates, and a further 13 wounded, while Black Joke suffered six wounded, two of whom subsequently died. El Almirante held 466 slaves who were later landed on the West African coast. (Note: A first-class share of the bounty money was worth £1014 5d; a sixth-class share was worth £3 15s 5 3/4d.)

On 6 March, Black Joke captured the two-gun brigantine Carolina, which carried 420 slaves. (Note: A first-class share of the bounty money was worth £893 3s 6d; a sixth-class share was worth £3 9s 2 1/4d.) After this capture, Downes was invalided home because of illness, and received a promotion to commander on his return in recognition of the capture of El Almirante. He had freed a total of 875 slaves.

Black Joke then came under the command of Lieutenant E. J. Parrey. On 11 October, he captured the Christina (or Cristina), a Spanish schooner of three guns and 24 crew members. She was carrying 354 slaves. (Note: A first class share of the bounty money was worth £696 7d; a sixth-class share was worth £2 12s 2d.) Lieutenant William Coyde replaced Parrey, and on 1 April 1830, captured the Spanish brigantine Manzanares of three guns and 34 crew. Manzanares was carrying 354 slaves. (Note: A first class share of the bounty money was worth £815 5s 11d; a sixth-class share was worth £2 19s 11d.)

Later that month, Black Joke was in refit in Sierra Leone. Coyde's replacement in Black Joke was Lieutenant William Ramsay.

On 9 November, she captured Dos Amigos, a Baltimore schooner with a crew of 34 and armed with a single carronade; Dos Amigos had 567 African captives aboard, but may have relanded them before her capture. The admiralty put Dos Amigos up for auction, where the commodore of the British Anti-Slavery Squadron, Jonathan Hayes, bought her and named her Fair Rosamond. In December, Black Joke was cruising in the Bight of Benin with HMS Medina.

On 21 or 22 February 1831, Black Joke captured a slaver with 300 slaves on board. This was probably the Spanish schooner Primeira. At the time, Black Joke was acting as a tender to HMS Dryad, (Note: A first-class share, which would have accrued to the captain of Dryad, was worth £369 2s 6d. A second first-class share, which would probably have accrued to Ramsey, was worth £184 11s 3d; a sixth-class share was worth £1 3s 6 3/4d.) and was under the temporary command of W. L. Castle.

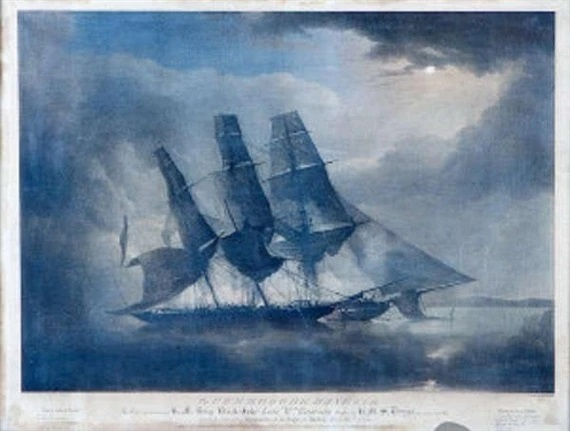
HM Brig Black Joke engaging the Spanish slave brig Maranerito in the Bay of Biafra, 26 April 1831, by George Philip Reinagle

In a famous action on 25 or 26 April 1831, Black Joke was again under Ramsey's command when she captured the Marinerito. Black Joke captured the much larger and more heavily armed Spanish slaver off the island of Bioko. At one point, 15-year-old Midshipman Hinde had to bring Black Joke back alongside Marinerito to rescue the boarding party, including Ramsey, which had become stranded on the Spanish slaver's deck. His rescue effort cost Hinde a bite from an angry parrot. Marinerito had 15 of her crew killed; Black Joke lost one man killed and four wounded, one of whom was Ramsey. Of the 496 slaves on Marinerito, 26 were found to have died and 107 were in so weakened a state that they were landed on Bioko, where more than half subsequently died. The remainder were taken to freedom in Sierra Leone. (Note: A first-class share was worth £533 8s 9d; a sixth-class share was worth £1 18s 6 3/4d.)

In September, in company with Fair Rosamond, Black Joke chased two Spanish slavers into the Bonny River. Lieutenant Ramsey reported that "during the chase, they were seen to throw their slaves overboard, by twos shackled together by the ankles, and left in this manner to sink or swim." Fair Rosamond captured two Spanish vessels, Regulo and Rapido, on 10 September and took them to Sierra Leone, where the Admiralty Court condemned them. Black Joke freed 39 slaves, for which a half bounty was paid to the captain and crew. A further bounty was paid for the 29 slaves who died between the capture and the condemnation of the Regulo. (Note: A first-class share was worth £383 8s 1d; a sixth-class share was worth £1 8s 6d. Later it was discovered that nine men had been left off the prize list for the capture of Potosi (by Fair Rosamond), and Rapido and Regulo, and the holders of sixth-class shares were obliged to return 1s 3/4d for distribution to these men. However, a prize court reinstated a half-bounty for 29 slaves who had died prior to the Regulo's condemnation. A captain's share was £13 10s, a commander's share was £6 5s, and a sixth-class share was 11 1/2d.)

Ramsey received promotion to the rank of commander for the capture of Marinerito and handed over command to Lieutenant H. V. Huntley. On 15 February 1832, Black Joke captured Spanish schooner Frasquita, alias Centilla, which was armed with two guns and had a crew of 31 men. Frasquitta yielded bounty money for the 290 slaves on board her. (Note: A first-class share was worth £303 3s 6d; a sixth-class share was worth £1 1s 9 3/4d.)

In all, between November 1830 and March 1832, Black Joke and Fair Rosamond accounted for 11 of the squadron's take of 13 slavers.

== Fate ==
A survey held on the Black Joke in 1832 stated that her timbers were rotten, and that "she is not, in our opinion, a vessel calculated fit for H.M. Service." Discussions about further use of Black Joke included her use as a government vessel for Sierra Leone. She was due to be transferred to the governor when the rear admiral changed his mind and ordered that Black Joke be destroyed. She was burnt on 3 May 1832 and her stores sold. The surveyors attached examples of her timber; all that now remains of the famous slave-chaser is an envelope filled with brown dust in The National Archives. In 1958, "a small quantity of the 'testings' of the timber of Black Joke were sent to Lagos for exhibition in the museum there".

When the Royal Navy ordered that Black Joke be burned, Peter Leonard, surgeon of HMS Dryad, wrote that she was the ship "which has done more towards putting an end to the vile traffic in slaves than all the ships of the station put together."
