= Black Joke (1720 ship) =

British merchant ship

History

Great Britain
- Name: Black Joke
- Owner: George Austin, John Tomlinson, & John Knight
- Launched: 1720, or 1743

General characteristics
- Tons burthen: 30, or 40 (bm)

Black Joke was a ship built in 1720 or 1743. She appeared in Lloyd's Register (LR) in the issue for 1764. Between 1764 and 1767, she made three complete voyages from Liverpool as a slave ship in the triangular trade in enslaved people.

Year	Master	Owner	Trade
1764	Tobias Pollard	Knight & Co.	Gambia & Africa

1st voyage transporting enslaved people (1764): Captain Joseph Pollard sailed from Liverpool on 5 March 1764, bound for the Gambia. Black Joke arrived in Dominica later that year with 90 captives.

2nd voyage transporting enslaved people (1765–1766): Captain Pollard sailed from Liverpool on 18 February 1765, bound for the Gambia. Black Joke arrived in South Carolina on 1 June with 90 captives. She arrived back at Liverpool on 16 January 1766. She had left Liverpool with 15 crew members and she had suffered eight crew deaths on her voyage.

In 1765, Black Joke's master, possibly Thomas Marshall, flogged a 9-month-old baby. The baby was fretful and refused to eat. Captain Marshall then forced the baby's mother to throw her child overboard.

3rd voyage transporting enslaved people (1766–1767): Captain Thomas Marshall sailed from Liverpool on 11 April 1766, and started acquiring captives at the Gambia in May. Black Joke arrived at Barbados on 8 October 1767 with 61 captives. She arrived back at Liverpool on 12 January 1767.
