= Kampong Pengiran Siraja Muda Delima Satu =

Kampong Pengiran Siraja Muda Delima Satu Kampung Pengiran Siraja Muda Delima Satu
- Village
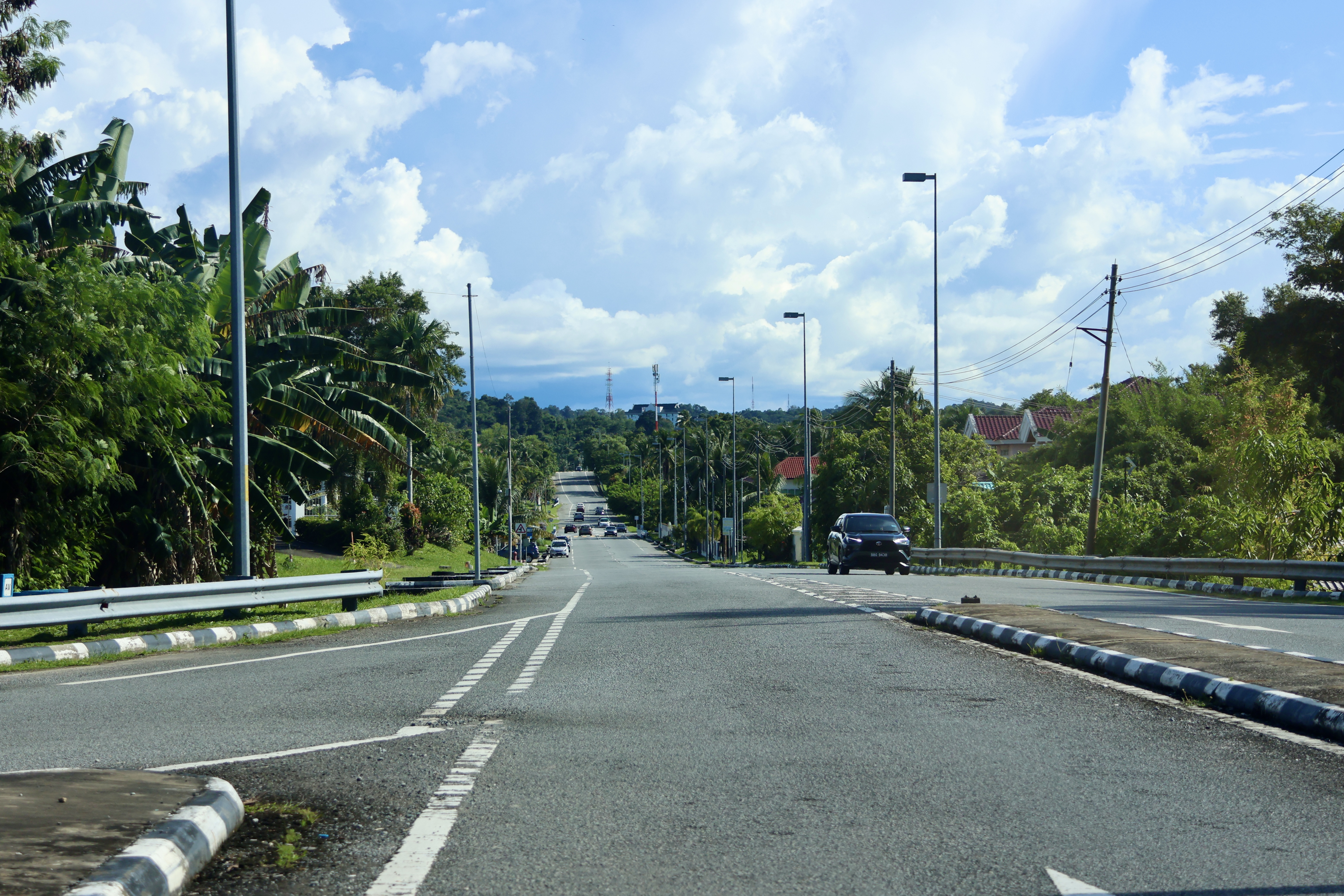
- Jalan Kebangsaan

- Location in Brunei
- Coordinates: 4°56′38″N 114°57′16″E
- Country: Brunei
- District: Brunei-Muara
- Mukim: Berakas 'A'
- Established: 1952
- Named for: Pomegranate

Population (2016)
  - Total: 2,354
- Time zone: UTC+8 (BNT)
- Postcode: BB5113

Kampong Pengiran Siraja Muda Delima Satu is a village in Brunei-Muara District, Brunei, and a neighbourhood in the capital Bandar Seri Begawan. The population was 2,354 in 2016. It is one of the villages within Mukim Berakas 'A'. The postcode is BB5113.

== Etymology ==
Pengiran Siraja Muda Delima Satu (or Delima Satu Pengiran Siraja Muda) is the primary name for this neighbourhood. It is composed from the merger of two names, 'Pengiran Siraja Muda' and 'Delima Satu'.

'Pengiran Siraja Muda' is named after the initial residents which emigrated from Bakut Pengiran Siraja Muda, a neighbourhood in the riverine settlement of Kampong Ayer. Meanwhile, 'Delima Satu' comes from the Malay term which translates as 'Delima One' and means area one of Delima settlement. The settlement area, which also included Pancha Delima, is named after delima or pomegranate that had been grown in the backyard of Awang Sugut bin Mahat's home, who eventually became the first village head for the settlement.

The person entrusted to lead the village at that time as the first Ketua Kampong Awang Sugut bin Mahat. After Awang Sugut died in 1957 and in 1958 Pengiran Haji Buntar bin Pengiran Sulaiman took over the duties as the head of the village. While leading the village, Pengiran Haji Buntar suggested that the names of Kampung Delima Satu and Pengiran Siraja Muda should be united and his proposal was approved until today it is known as Kampung Delima Satu Pengiran Siraja Muda. Before it was called Kampung Delima Satu, the village was known as Kampong Sungai Agat which was inhabited by land people whose occupation was farming.

In fact, the name was also approved when on 14 January 1964, Sultan Omar Ali Saifuddien III through the Brunei-Muara District Officer approved the proposed name. Since then, the official name of Kampong Delima Satu Pengiran Siraja Muda. This date is based on the date registered from the Brunei and Muara District Officer whose official declaration certificate is still kept by Pengiran Haji Tajuddin bin Pengiran Haji Buntar (son of the late Pengiran Haji Buntar bin Pengiran Sulaiman).

== History ==
Before Kampong Delima Satu Pengiran Siraja Muda was explored, there was an area where the Kedayan tribe lived, this was based on the cemetery that still exists and one of the names that is still remembered is the name of 'Datu Kuncang' and the old cemetery and tombstones that are still there at Simpang 579, Jalan Kebangsaan Lama and Simpang 179, Jalan Delima Dua, said Pengiran Roslan. However, according to the records of the Brunei History Center, which is through the results of their research through the story teller, Pengiran Haji Chuchu bin Pengiran Abdul Rahim who was one of the people involved during the relocation said that the origin of the village was from a pomegranate tree planted by Awang Sugut bin Mahat in front of his house. At that time, most of the land dwellers were working as rubber tappers at the Berakas Estate Company in addition to working with the government.

The current neighbourhood was established in the 1950s as a perpindahan or resettlement estate under the National Resettlement Scheme (Malay: Rancangan Perpindahan Negara), a government programme that encouraged the residents of Kampong Ayer to resettle on land. The residents that had resettled in the area originally came from Bakut Pengiran Siraja Muda neighbourhood in Kampong Ayer (hence the name 'Pengiran Siraja Muda'); each family was given a 2-acre (0.81-hectare) piece of land as the incentive to build a new home and also develop agriculturally as new means to sustain livelihood. The village whose area was a gift of Sultan Omar Ali starting in 1952. In the beginning, most of the awarded areas were planted with rice crops. In 1955, with the consent of Sultan Omar Ali, he donated two acres of land to each family for the first relocation plan for the residents of Kampong Ayer, consisting of Kampong Bakut Pengiran Siraja Muda, Pandai Besi and Setia Pahlawan.

Kampong Delima Satu Pengiran Siraja Muda continues to experience rapid growth and development, especially in facing the competition of progress that started from a farming area to become part of the Bandar Seri Begawan area since 1 August 2007. It enjoys the various facilities provided by the government in meeting the welfare demands of the people and residents in it as enjoyed by other villages in the country. The village is famous for its commercial complex which offers a variety of options to its customers, in addition to often being the focus of tourists from within or outside the state to shop in as well as having a childcare center.

== Administration ==
In 2007, the village has also been incorporated as part of the expanded Bandar Seri Begawan municipal area, hence becomes a neighbourhood of the capital.

== Notable people ==
- Matnor McAfee (1922–1973), civil servant

== See also ==
- Pancha Delima
- List of neighbourhoods in Bandar Seri Begawan
