= Rodrigo Lima (footballer) =

Portuguese/Cape Verdean footballer

Personal information
- Full name: Rodrigo Filipe Carreiro Lima
- Date of birth: 2 March 1999 (age 27)
- Place of birth: Ponta Delgada, Portugal
- Height: 1.78 m (5 ft 10 in)
- Position: Midfielder

Youth career
- 2007–2013: Santa Clara
- 2013: Micaelense
- 2014–2019: Braga

Senior career*
Years	Team	Apps	(Gls)
2019–2020	Braga B	7	(0)
2020–2021	Torreense	11	(0)
2021	Florø	14	(4)
2023	Angrense	13	(1)
2023–2024	Salgueiros	16	(0)
2024–2025	Ceahlăul Piatra Neamț	7	(0)

International career^{‡}
2019	Cape Verde U20	1	(0)
2018–2019	Cape Verde	1	(0)
- * Club domestic league appearances and goals ‡ National team caps and goals as of 2 November 2024

Rodrigo Filipe Carreiro Lima (born 2 March 1999) is a professional footballer who plays as a midfielder.

== Club career ==
Lima started his senior career with Braga B, before moving to Torreense. On 1 August 2021, he signed for Norwegian Second Division club Florø.

== International career ==
Lima was born in Portugal and is of Cape Verdean descent through his parents. Lima made his debut in a 0–0 (4–3) penalty shootout win over Andorra on 3 June 2018.
