= Delima Silalahi =

Indonesian environmental activist

Delima Silalahi is an environmental activist from North Tapanuli, Indonesia, known for her efforts in safeguarding customary forests and Indigenous rights in North Sumatra. As the executive director of the NGO Kelompok Studi dan Pengembangan Prakarsa Masyarakat (KSPPM), she orchestrated efforts to reclaim over 17,000 acres of tropical forest that had been converted by a pulp and paper company.

In recognition of her activism toward environmental conservation, Silalahi was awarded the Goldman Environmental Prize in 2023. Her work continues to emphasize the intricate connections between the forest ecosystems, Indigenous heritage, and local economy in the region.

== Career and activism ==
Silalahi's environmental activism began in her college years, especially after a significant 2013 Constitutional Court ruling that stated that customary forests are distinct from state forests in Indonesia.

In 1999, Silalahi joined Kelompok Studi dan Pengembangan Prakarsa Masyarakat (KSPPM), a human rights and forest advocacy group in Sumatra, as a volunteer. Here, she engaged with local communities affected by land appropriation and criminalization, exploring the environmental consequences of the pulp and paper industry.

After becoming the executive director of KSPPM in 2018, Silalahi co-orchestrated mass mobilizations, including a coalition targeting deforestation in North Sumatra, specifically associated with Procter & Gamble through the “Shut Down TPL” movement.

=== Fight against Toba Pulp Lestari (TPL) ===
A significant portion of Silalahi's work has been directed at preserving North Sumatra's remaining intact rainforests and upholding the rights of the Batak Toba Indigenous communities. This effort predominantly challenges TPL, a pulp and paper manufacturer linked to Procter & Gamble, known for forest destruction since the 1980s.

Between 2019 and 2022, Silalahi aided six Batak communities in obtaining recognition for customary forest (hutan adat), thus saving more than 7,000 hectares from destruction. Her advocacy efforts led to Indonesia's Ministry of Environment and Forestry acknowledging these communities' forest claims.

In May 2023, Silalahi took her campaign to Cincinnati, where Procter & Gamble (P&G) is headquartered. Her focus in Cincinnati centered on P&G's connection to Toba Pulp Lestari (TPL) through its longtime palm oil supplier, Royal Golden Eagle (RGE). TPL has been involved in land grabbing and intimidation against Indigenous Batak communities, and Silalahi has called for P&G to cut ties with RGE to demonstrate respect for Indigenous rights.

Supported by a delegation of Indigenous Batak Toba activists from the Pargamanan-Bintang Maria community and a broad coalition of Ohio activists, Silalahi's campaign emphasized the urgent need for corporate responsibility. The issue was further magnified by TPL's occupation of 40% of Pargamanan-Bintang Maria customary lands, leading to ecological disruptions and threatening the local economy. Silalahi's advocacy in Cincinnati underlined the importance of respecting the rights of frontline communities that have protected forests for generations, particularly in the context of global climate change targets.

As of August 2023, Silalahi's ongoing efforts are concentrated on the Pargamanan-Bintang Maria people, another Batak Toba community striving for forest recognition.

=== Impact ===
Silalahi has successfully recovered 17,824 acres of tropical forest from conversion to industrial plantations and has initiated the rehabilitation of native forest species in the area. Her work highlights the ecological, cultural, and economic significance of these forests for the local Indigenous populations.

In 2023, Silalahi was awarded the Goldman Environmental Prize. The following year, Silalahi became a laureate of the Asian Scientist 100 by the Asian Scientist.
