= French Reef =

Coral reef in the Florida Keys, US

- Location within Florida Location within the Caribbean

Location
- Location: Caribbean
- Coordinates: 25°02′07″N 080°20′58″W
- Country: United States

Geology
- Type: reef

French Reef is a coral reef located within the Florida Keys National Marine Sanctuary. It lies 11 kilometres (5.9 nmi; 6.8 mi) southeast of Key Largo, within the Key Largo Existing Management Area of the Florida Keys National Marine Sanctuary, which is immediately to the east of John Pennekamp Coral Reef State Park. French Reef is northeast of Molasses Reef. Part of the reef lies within a Sanctuary Preservation Area (SPA) of the national marine sanctuary, which is 37 hectares (91 acres) in area. A number of caves and arches in a spur and groove formation are included in the SPA.

== Gallery ==
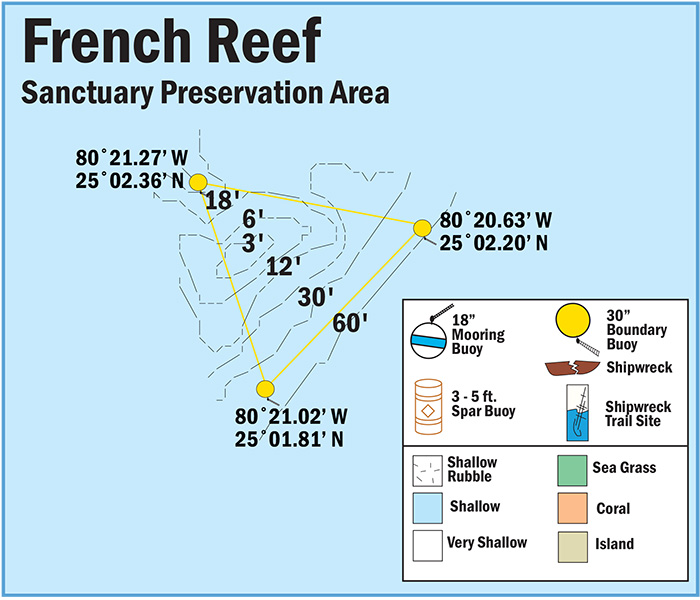
NOAA Map of French Reef

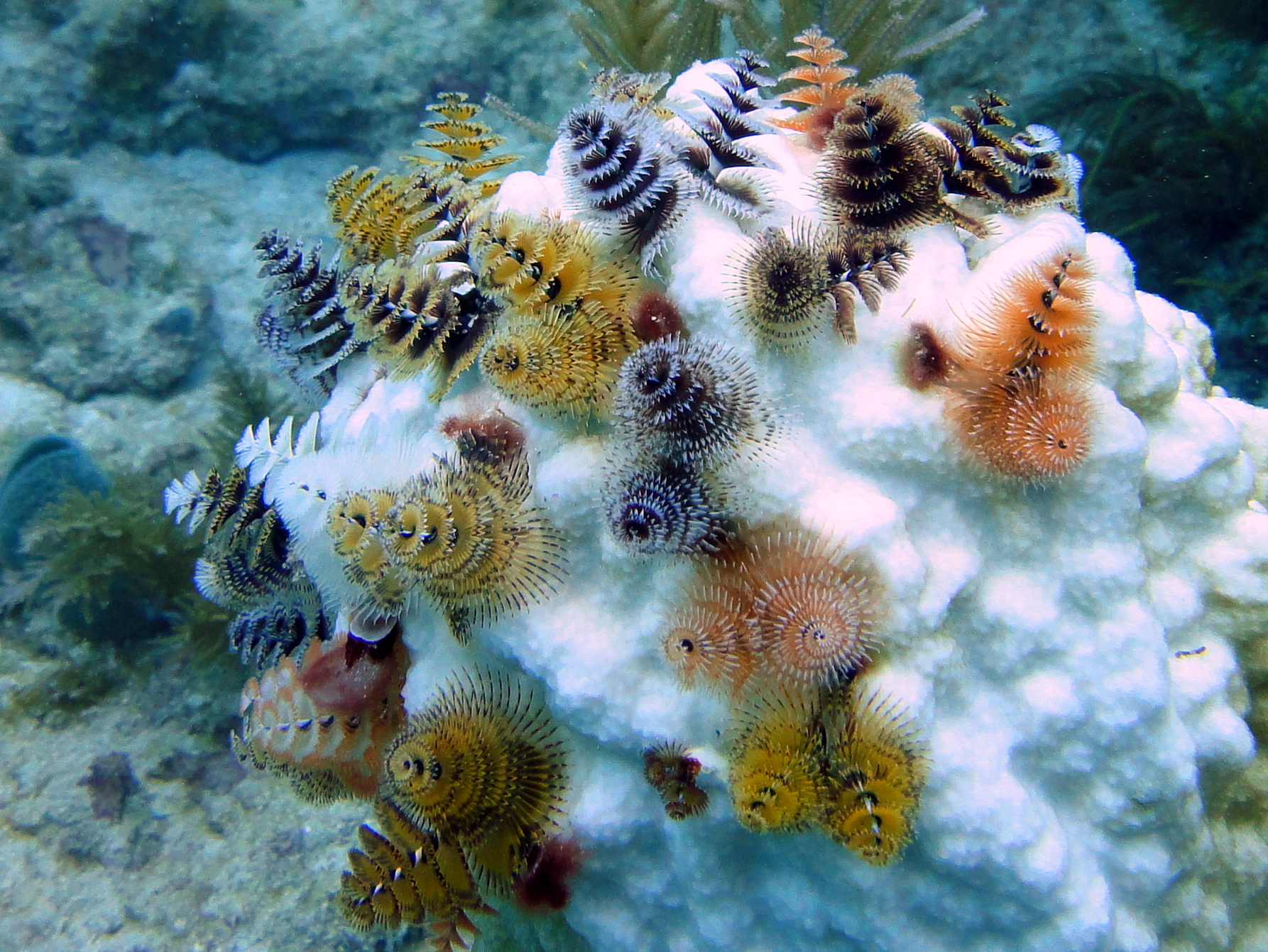
Christmas tree worms on a bleached coral head, 2014

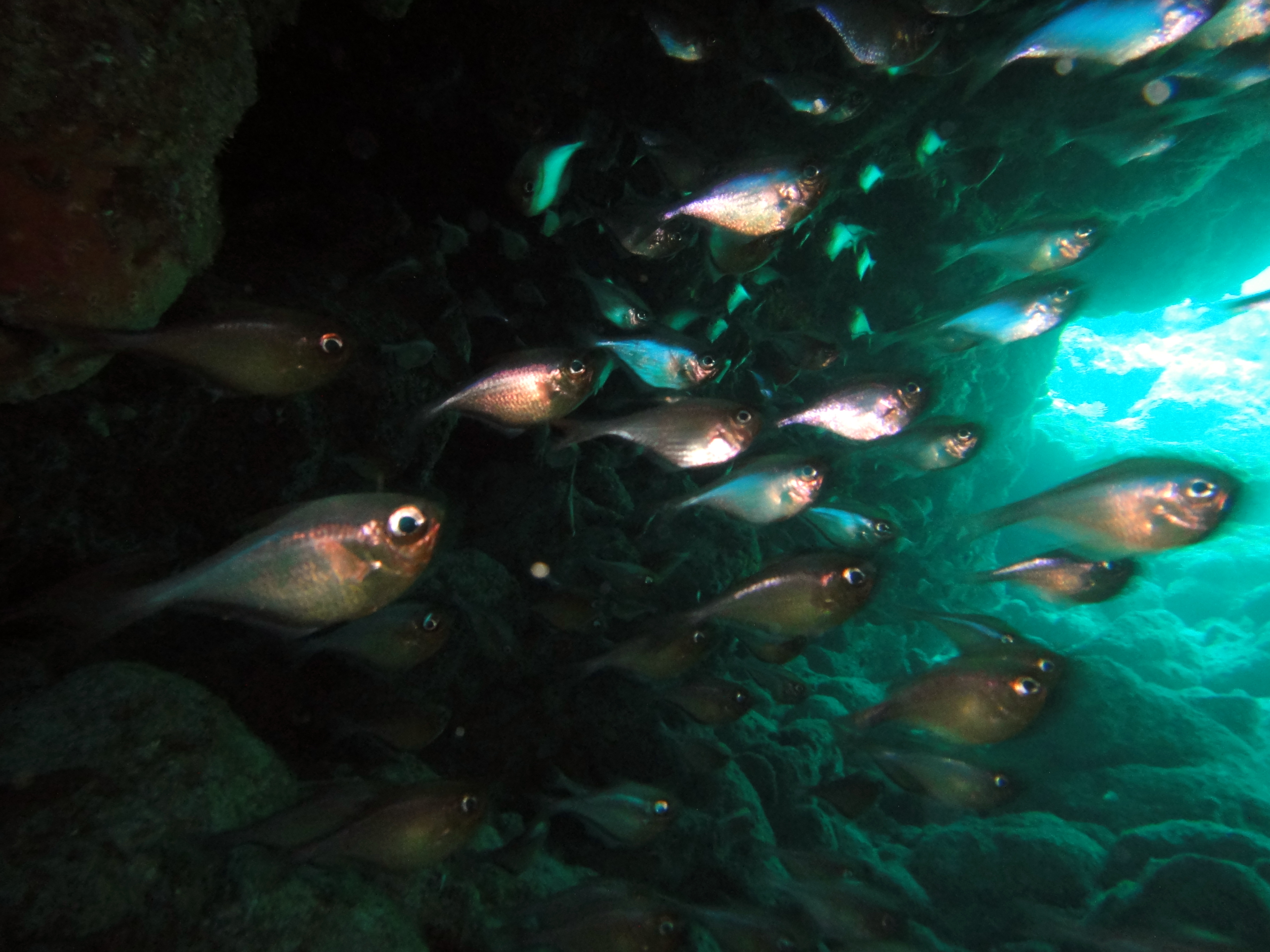
Glassy sweeper (genus Pempheris) inside cave

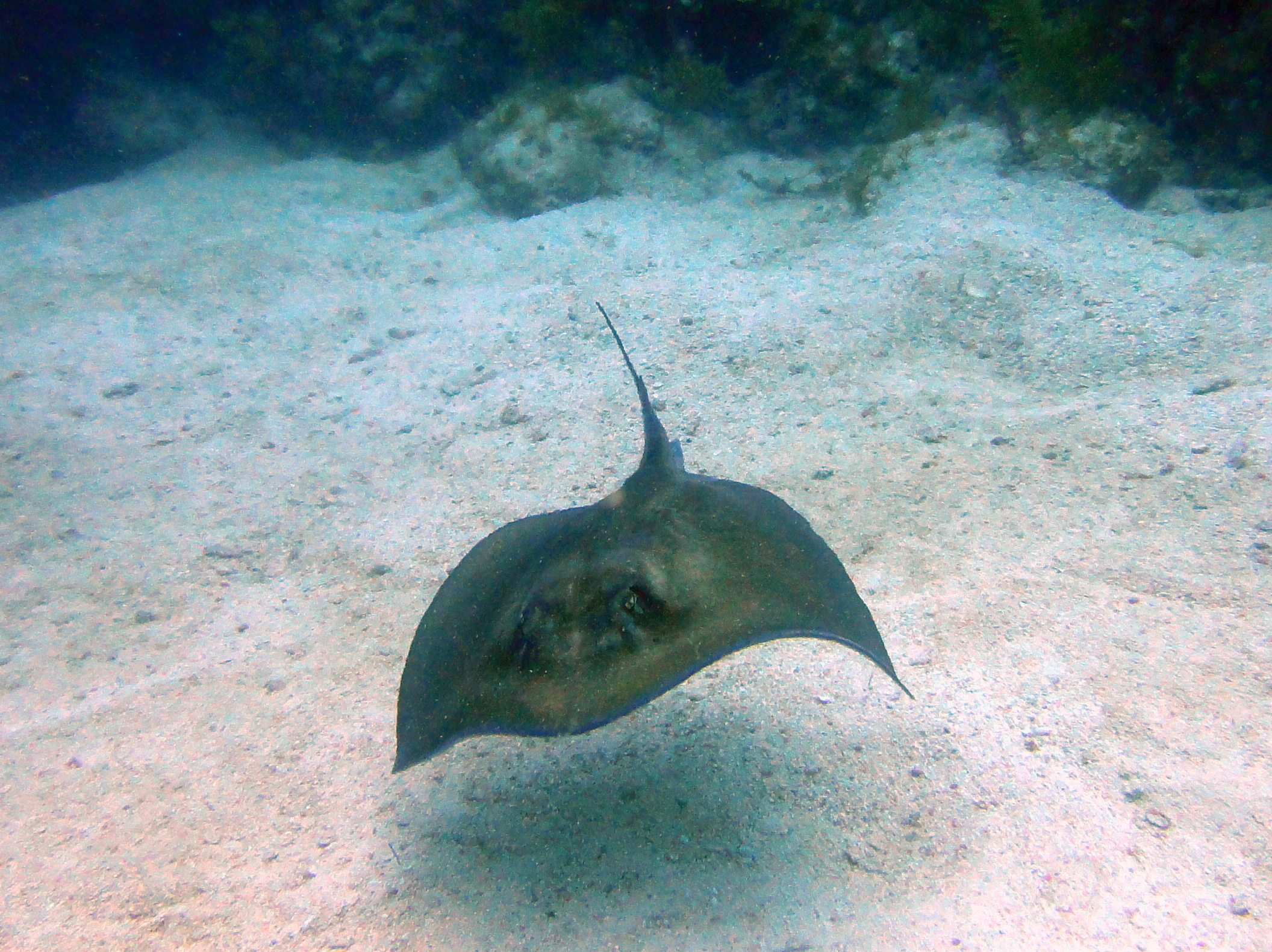
Stingray on French Reef

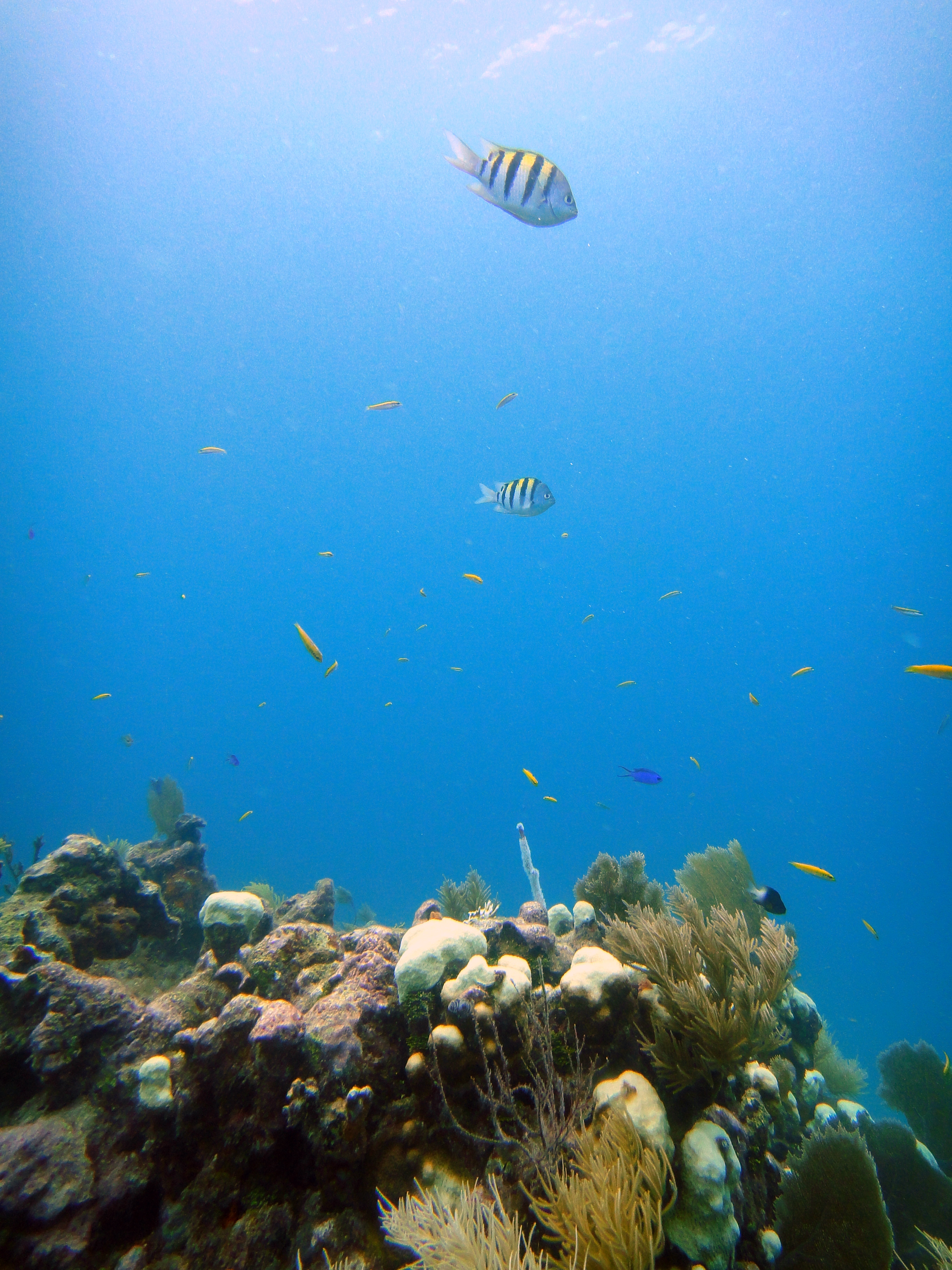
Sergeant major fish over French Reef
