= Coffins Patch =

Coral reef in the Florida Keys, US

- Location within Florida Location within the Caribbean

Location
- Location: Caribbean
- Coordinates: 24°41′07″N 080°58′00″W
- Country: United States

Geology
- Type: reef

Coffins Patch is a shallow coral reef (patch reef) located within the Florida Keys National Marine Sanctuary. It lies to the southeast of Bamboo Key. This reef lies within a Sanctuary Preservation Area (SPA).
