= Turtle Reef =

Coral reef in the Florida Keys, US

- Location within Florida Location within the Caribbean

Location
- Location: Caribbean
- Coordinates: 25°17′00″N 80°12′30″W
- Country: United States

Geology
- Type: reef

Turtle Reef is a coral reef situated at the northern extremity of the Turtle Rocks shoal, and located within the Florida Keys National Marine Sanctuary. It lies to the east of Key Largo, within the Key Largo Existing Management Area, which is immediately to the east of John Pennekamp Coral Reef State Park within Hawk Channel. Unlike many reefs within the National Marine Sanctuary, this reef is not within a Sanctuary Preservation Area (SPA). The reef is north of Carysfort Reef.

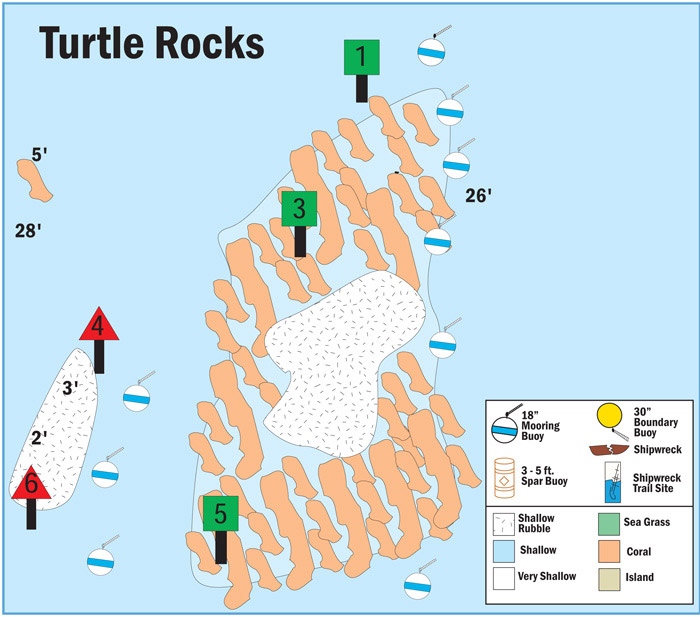
NOAA map of the reef
