= Bamboo Key =

- Location within Florida Location within the Caribbean

Location
- Location: Caribbean
- Coordinates: 24.7551397°N 81.0022939°W
- Country: United States

Geology
- Type: reef

Bamboo Key is a small, tree-covered coral island located within the Florida Keys National Marine Sanctuary.
