= Florida Keys National Marine Sanctuary =

Marine protected area in Florida, US

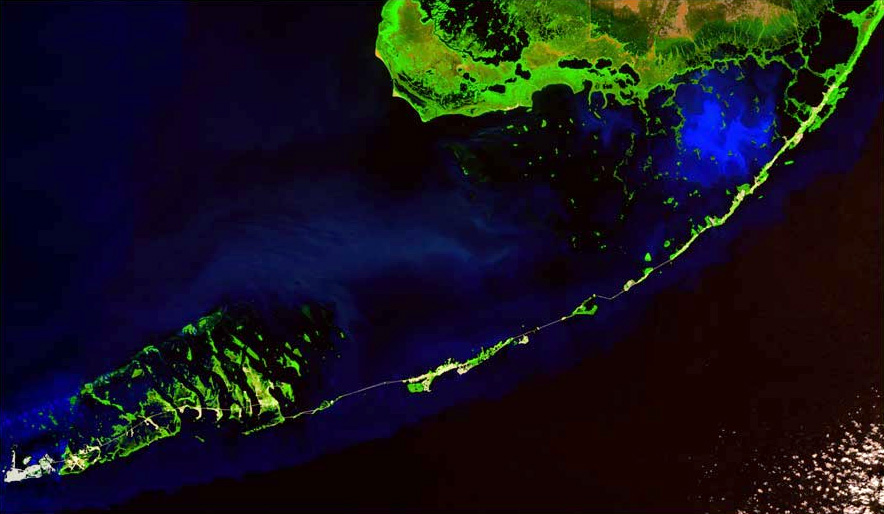
- View from space

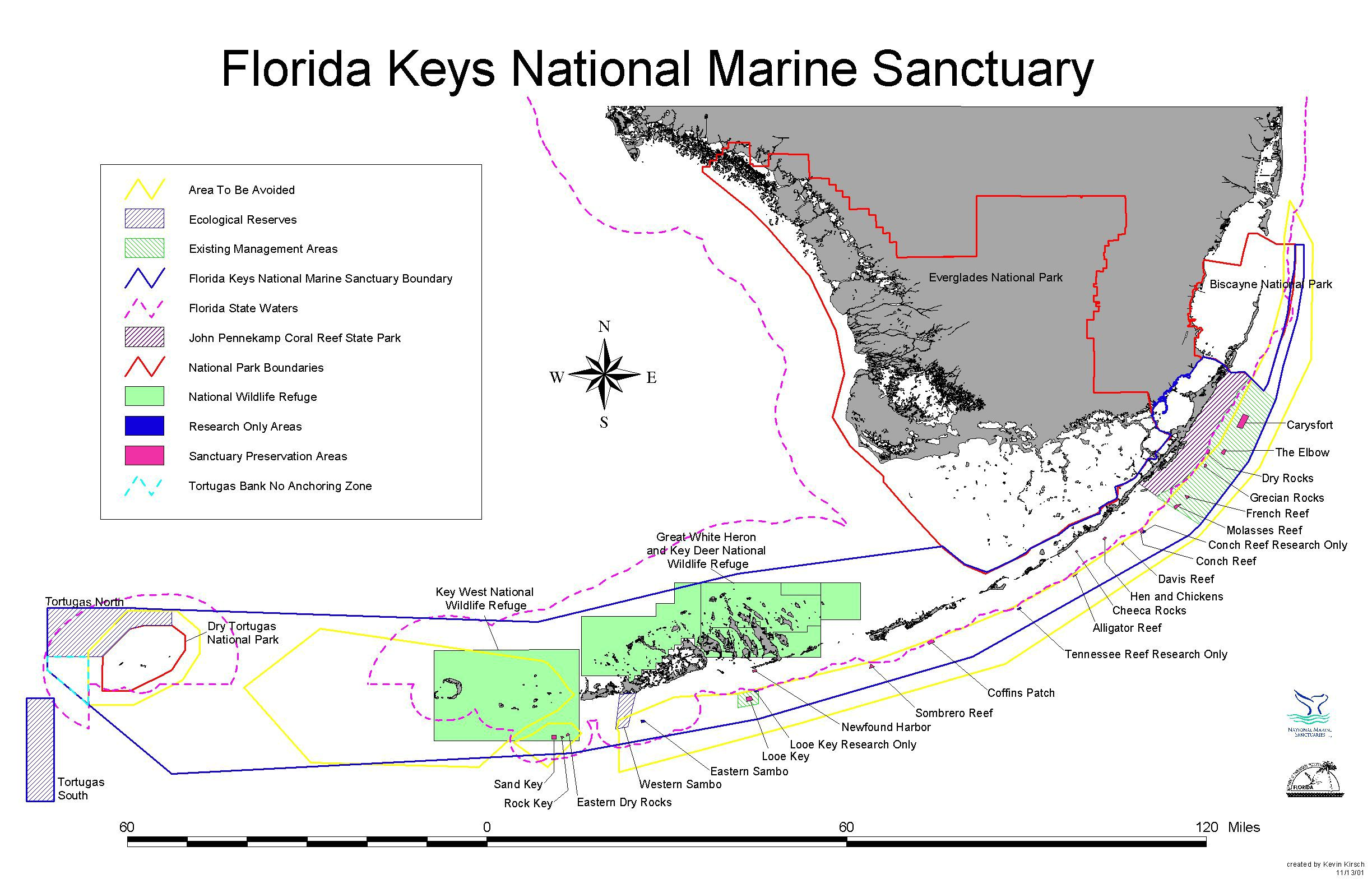
- Florida Keys NMS
- Location: Florida Keys, U.S.
- Coordinates: 24.68°N 81.24°W
- Area: 2,900 square nautical miles (9,947 km^{2}; 3,840 sq mi)
- Established: December 28, 1990; 35 years ago; Expanded 2001
- Governing body: NOAA National Ocean Service
- Website: floridakeys.noaa.gov

The Florida Keys National Marine Sanctuary is a U.S. National Marine Sanctuary in the Florida Keys. It includes the Florida Reef, the only barrier coral reef in North America and the third-largest coral barrier reef in the world. It also has extensive mangrove forest and seagrass fields. The Florida Keys National Marine Sanctuary, designated on December 28, 1990, was the ninth national marine sanctuary to be established. The Florida Keys National Marine Sanctuary protects approximately 2,900 square nautical miles (9,947 km^{2}; 3,840 sq mi) of coastal and ocean waters from the estuarine waters of South Florida along the Florida Keys archipelago and the Hawk Channel passage, encompassing more than 1,700 islands, out to the Dry Tortugas National Park, reaching into the Atlantic Ocean, Florida Bay, and the Gulf of Mexico.

The mission of the sanctuary is to protect the marine resources of the Florida Keys while facilitating human uses that are consistent with the primary objective of resource protection. Sanctuary waters and habitats support high species diversity due to the presence of both tropical and subtropical species, including the largest documented contiguous seagrass community in the northern hemisphere and extensive coral reef habitat. The sanctuary is also home to maritime heritage resources that encompass a broad historical period.

== Human impact ==
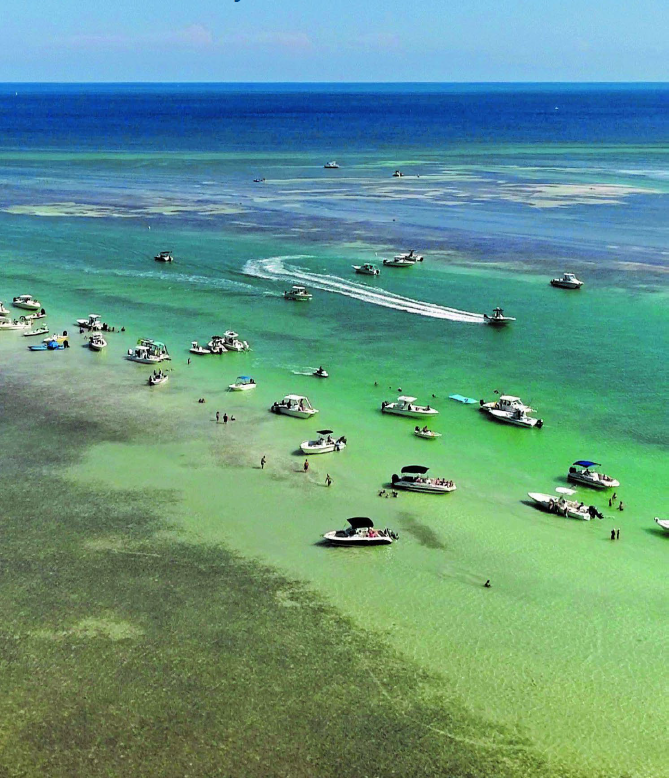
Boats and boaters on the flats in the sanctuary in the late 2000s.

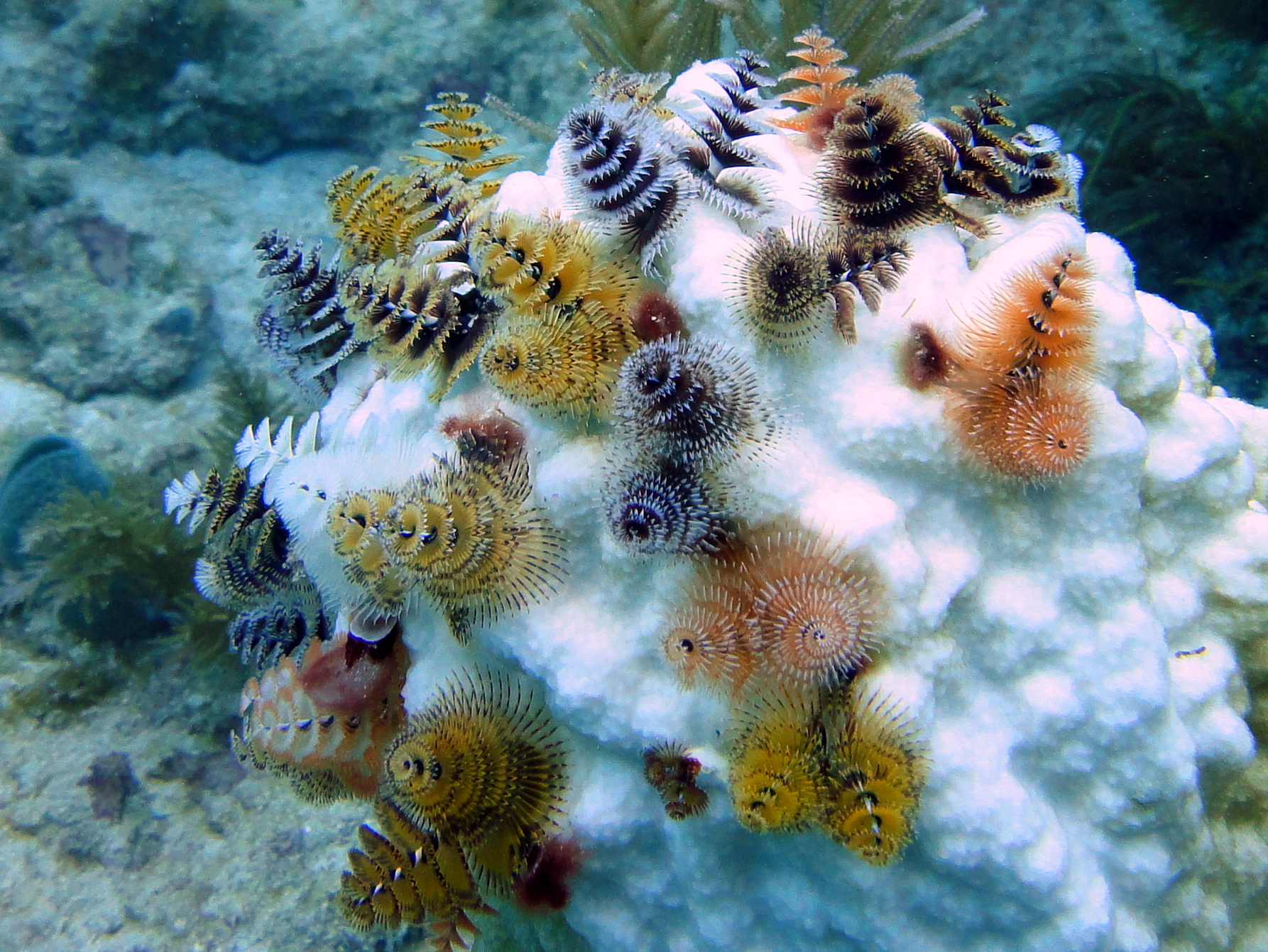
Christmas tree worms on a bleached coral head at French Reef in 2014.

=== Population and urban development ===
Population growth and urban development may impact the health of coral reefs. Development activities may cause erosion resulting in the runoff of sediments which eventually reach the coral reefs. Storm water runoff may carry fertilizers into the ocean causing damage to the coral reefs, and an increase of nutrient concentrations in the reef may cause an increase of algae which may smother the corals. Sizable foreign objects such as sunken boats and planes provide rich micro-sanctuaries for a plethora of sea life that otherwise would not exist.

=== Fishing activities ===
The harvest of resources from the sea is ever growing. Overfishing has changed the ecological dynamics of marine communities allowing some organisms to dominate reefs that were once controlled by large reef fish populations.

=== Tourism ===
Tourism dollars help to fund scientific research and environmental remediation activities. Tourism may contribute to reef damage. Divers and snorkelers may harm the corals by touching the polyps, and boats may damage it by running aground and dragging anchors.

=== Coral bleaching ===
Global warming coupled with an intense El Niño has led to higher sea water temperatures throughout the area, which can cause coral bleaching. "Minor paling" of some corals has been observed by local Coral Bleaching Early Warning Network, a program of Mote Marine Laboratory and the Florida Keys National Marine Sanctuary.

== Invasive animal species ==
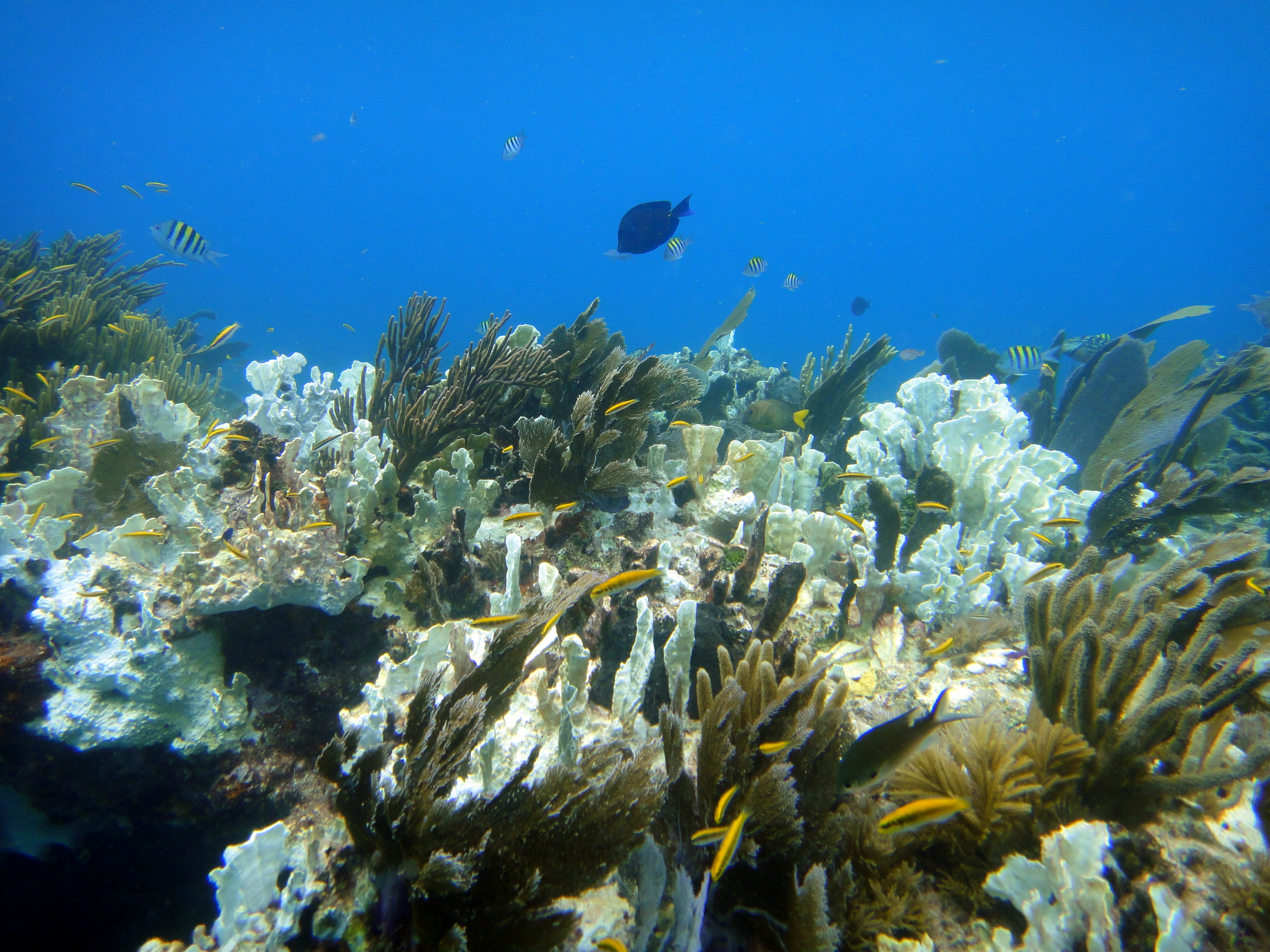
Partially bleached hard and soft corals at Molasses Reef, 2014

=== Lionfish ===
One of the Florida Keys' most ecologically damaging invasive species is the lionfish. First discovered as an introduced species in 2009, the lionfish population affects the original flora and fauna of the Florida Keys in three major ways. The lionfish has an appetite for native fish and crustaceans and is able to spawn year-round. Originating in the Pacific Ocean, the lionfish has no known predator in the Atlantic Ocean. The lack of natural predators to control the lionfish population allows the lionfish population to grow to disruptive numbers. Lionfish are predators of juvenile fish, such as commercially important grouper and snapper, as well as juvenile parrotfish, which graze on algae in coral reefs, preventing the algae from overgrowing and killing corals. The lionfish’s dietary consumption of native species of the Florida Keys not only affects the species diversity of the Florida Keys, but also causes detriment to the environment due to a decrease in fish who help maintain the coral reefs. The regular spawning of the lionfish further impacts the environment of the Florida Keys; which therefore always maintains a stable reproductive population. A female lionfish can produce 30,000 to 40,000 eggs every few days; lionfish become sexually mature by the time they are a year old. The regular spawning of the lionfish creates a constant pressure on the Florida Keys ecosystem.

== Invasive exotic plants ==
There are various introduced plants within the Florida Keys. Many of these plants outcompete the original plants of the Keys, such as mangroves and seagrass. The animals who rely on native plants for food and habitat are also at risk by invasive plants. There are four main exotic plant species that have become so invasive in the Florida Keys that they threaten and endanger 42 native plant species and 27 animal species to the point of extinction. Australian pine, Brazilian pepper or Florida holly, Asiatic colubrine, and Melaleuca all pose a risk to the flora and fauna of the Florida Keys.

=== Australian pine ===
The Australian pine is a nonnative species that poses risks to the original flora and fauna of the Florida Keys. The Australian pine "outcompetes native vegetation by producing a dense leaf litter beneath them;" therefore the Australian pine does not allow the native plants to obtain needed nutrients. The Australian pine also has a comparative advantage over native species: the Australian pine can quickly "invade newly accreted beaches, beaches where dredge spoil has been deposited, and beaches where a storm has destroyed existing vegetation." The Australian pine displaces native flora of the Florida keys, and displaces native fauna by providing no native wildlife habitat.

=== Brazilian pepper ===
The Brazilian pepper tree is native to Argentina, Paraguay, and Brazil, but was brought to Florida in the mid-1800s as an ornamental plant. The introduction of the Brazilian pepper has disturbed the biodiversity of the Florida ecosystem, as one of the most widespread of the invasive non-indigenous pest plants in Florida. The Brazilian pepper tree has invaded over 700,000 acres in Florida. The tree produces a dense canopy that shades out all other plants and provides a very poor habitat for growth to native species. "The Brazilian pepper invades aquatic as well as terrestrial habitats, reducing the quality of native biotic communities."

== Reefs ==
Notable reefs in the sanctuary include:

- Sand Key
- Rock Key
- Eastern Dry Rocks
- Western Sambo
- Eastern Sambo
- 9-foot Stake
- Marker 32
- Looe Key
- Newfound Harbor Key
- Sombrero Key
- Coffins Patch
- Tennessee Reef
- Alligator Reef
- Cheeca Rocks
- Hen and Chickens
- Davis Reef
- Conch Reef
- Snapper Ledge
- Pickles Reef
- Molasses Reef
- French Reef
- Crocker Reef
- Grecian Rocks
- Dry Rocks
- The Elbow
- Carysfort Reef
- Turtle Reef
- Pacific Reef
- Ajax Reef
