= 9-foot Stake =

Coral reef in the Florida Keys, US

- Location within Florida Location within the Caribbean

Location
- Location: Caribbean
- Coordinates: 24°28′18″N 081°45′51″W
- Country: United States

Geology
- Type: reef

9-foot Stake is a coral reef located within the Florida Keys National Marine Sanctuary. It lies to the south of Key West, and is west of Marker 32 reef. Unlike many reefs in the Sanctuary, it is not within a Sanctuary Preservation Area (SPA).

The reef gets its name from a fallen telephone pole within the reef.

== Gallery ==
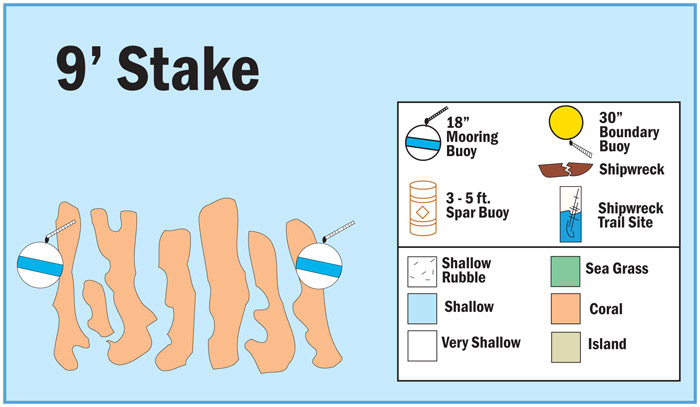
NOAA map of the reef

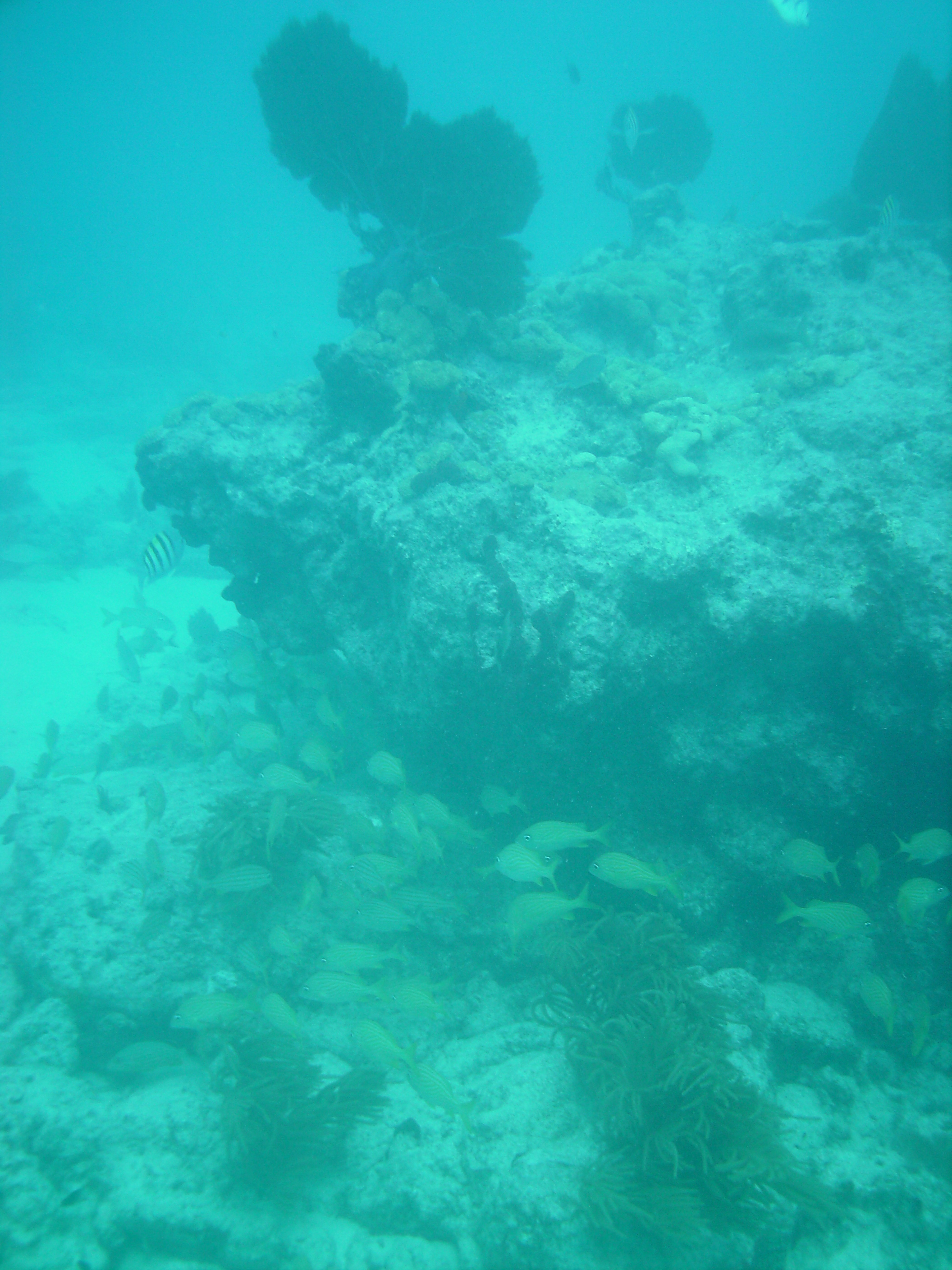
A school of grunts and some soft corals at 9-foot Stake reef

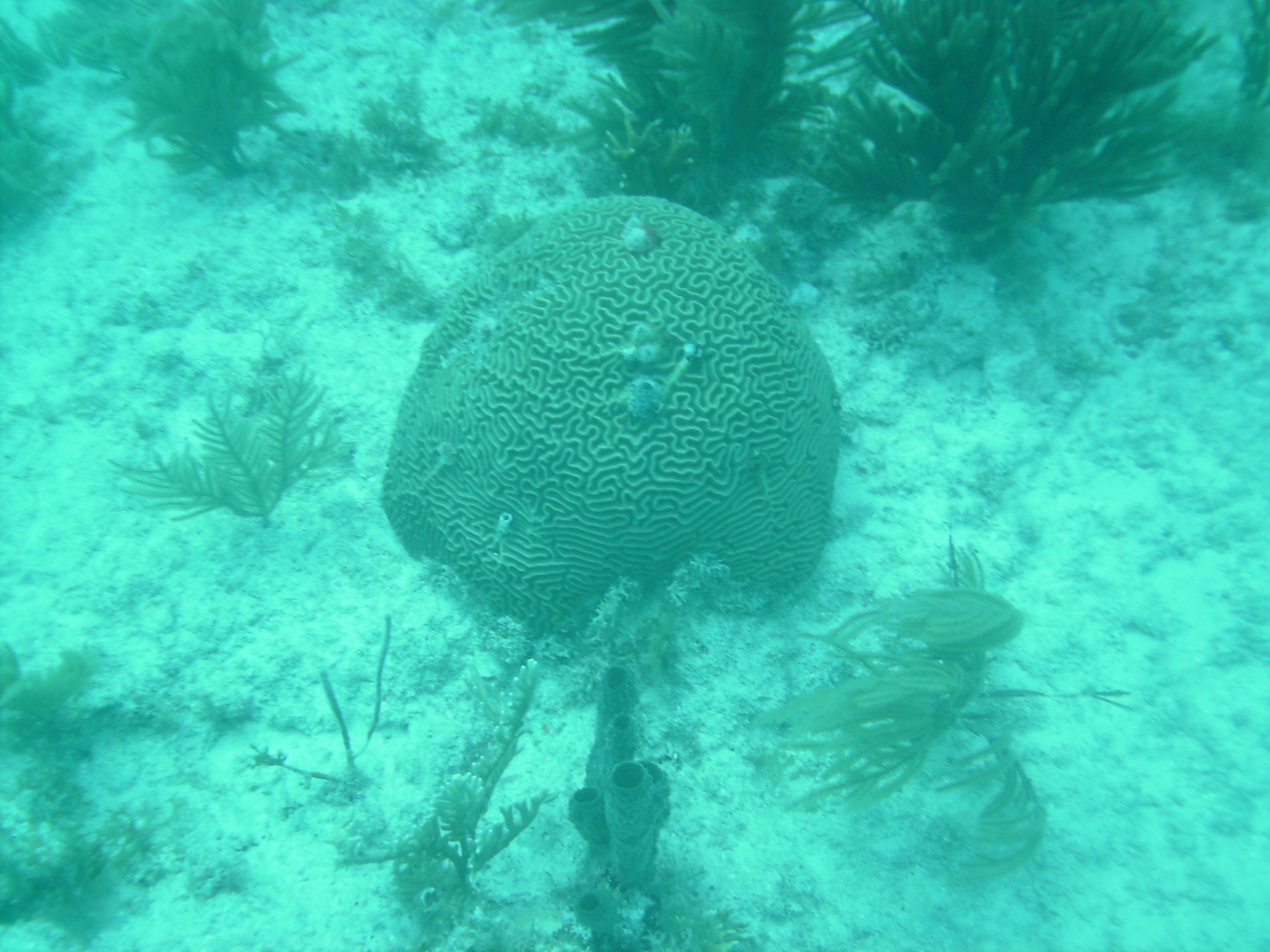
Brain coral (Diploria strigosa) at 9-foot Stake reef in 2010
