= Newfound Harbor Key =

Reef in the Florida Keys

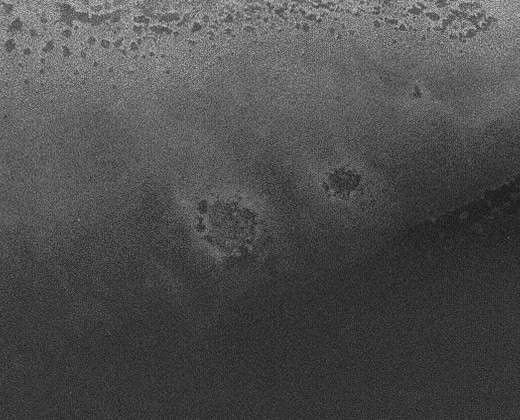
- 1979 air photo. Image is approximately 1 km wide.

- Location within Florida Location within the Caribbean

Location
- Location: Caribbean
- Coordinates: 24.615°N 81.392°W
- Country: United States

Geology
- Type: reef

Newfound Harbor Key is a shallow coral reef located within the Florida Keys National Marine Sanctuary. It lies to the south of Big Pine Key, and north of Looe Key. This reef is within a Sanctuary Preservation Area (SPA).
