= Cheeca Rocks =

Coral reef in the Florida Keys, US

- Location within Florida Location within the Caribbean

Location
- Location: Caribbean
- Coordinates: 24°54′14″N 080°36′58″W
- Country: United States

Geology
- Type: reef

Cheeca Rocks is a shallow coral reef (patch reef) located within the Florida Keys National Marine Sanctuary. It lies approximately one mile to the southeast of Upper Matecumbe Key. This reef lies within a Sanctuary Preservation Area (SPA).
