= Molasses Reef =

Coral reef located within the Florida Keys National Marine Sanctuary

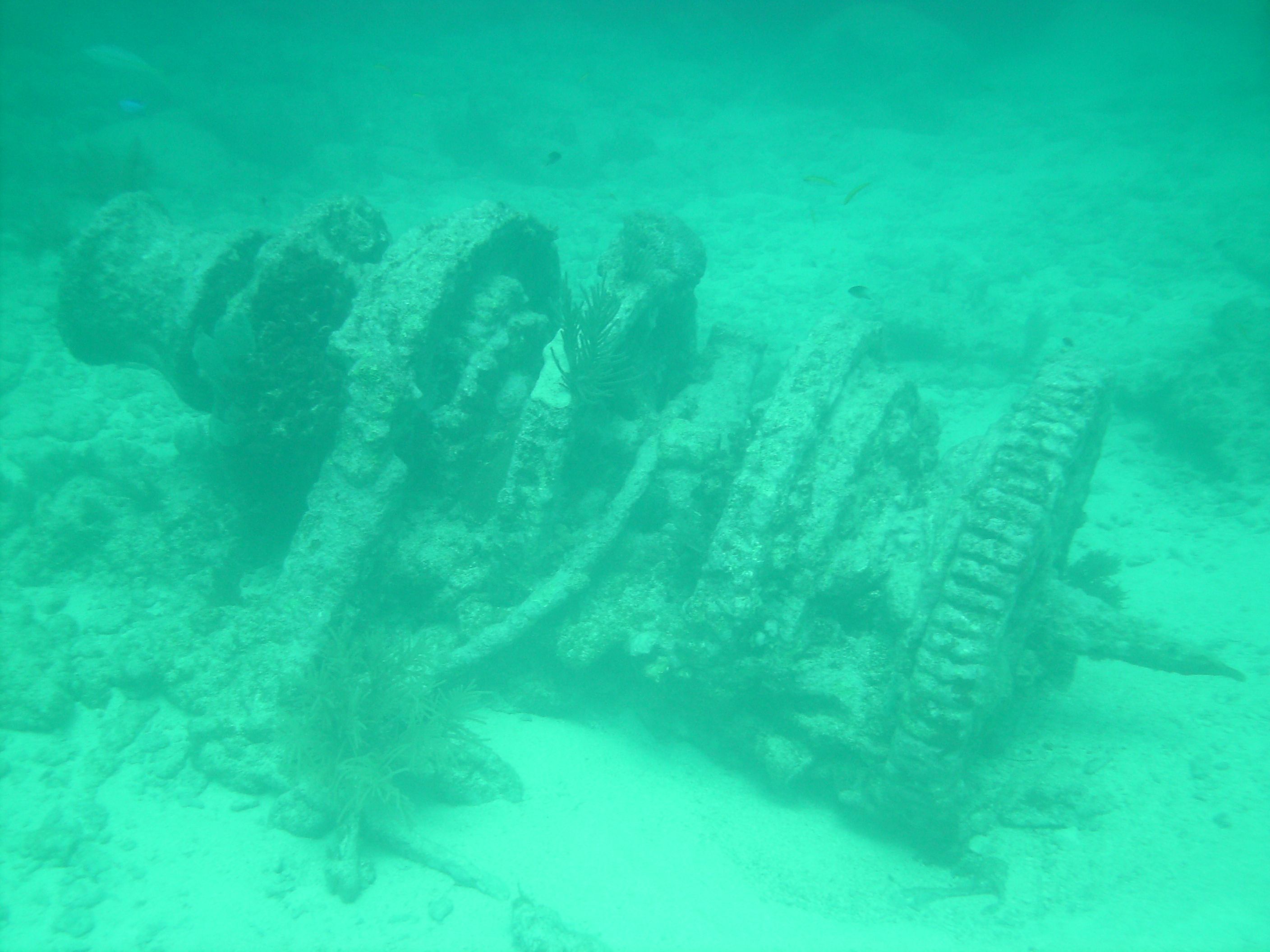
- The winch from the Slobadana sank on Molasses Reef in 1887

- Location within Florida Location within the Caribbean
- Location: Florida, USA
- Waterbody: Florida Keys National Marine Sanctuary
- Nearest land: Key Largo
- Coordinates: 25°00′50″N 80°22′15″W
- Dive type: Open-water
- Depth range: 6 to 60 ft (1.8 to 18.3 m)
- Average visibility: 40 to 60 ft (12 to 18 m)
- Entry type: Boat
- Bottom composition: Coral
- Water: Salt

Molasses Reef is a coral reef located within the Florida Keys National Marine Sanctuary in Florida, United States. It lies to the southeast of Key Largo, within the Key Largo Existing Management Area, which is immediately to the east of John Pennekamp Coral Reef State Park. This reef is within a Sanctuary Preservation Area (SPA).

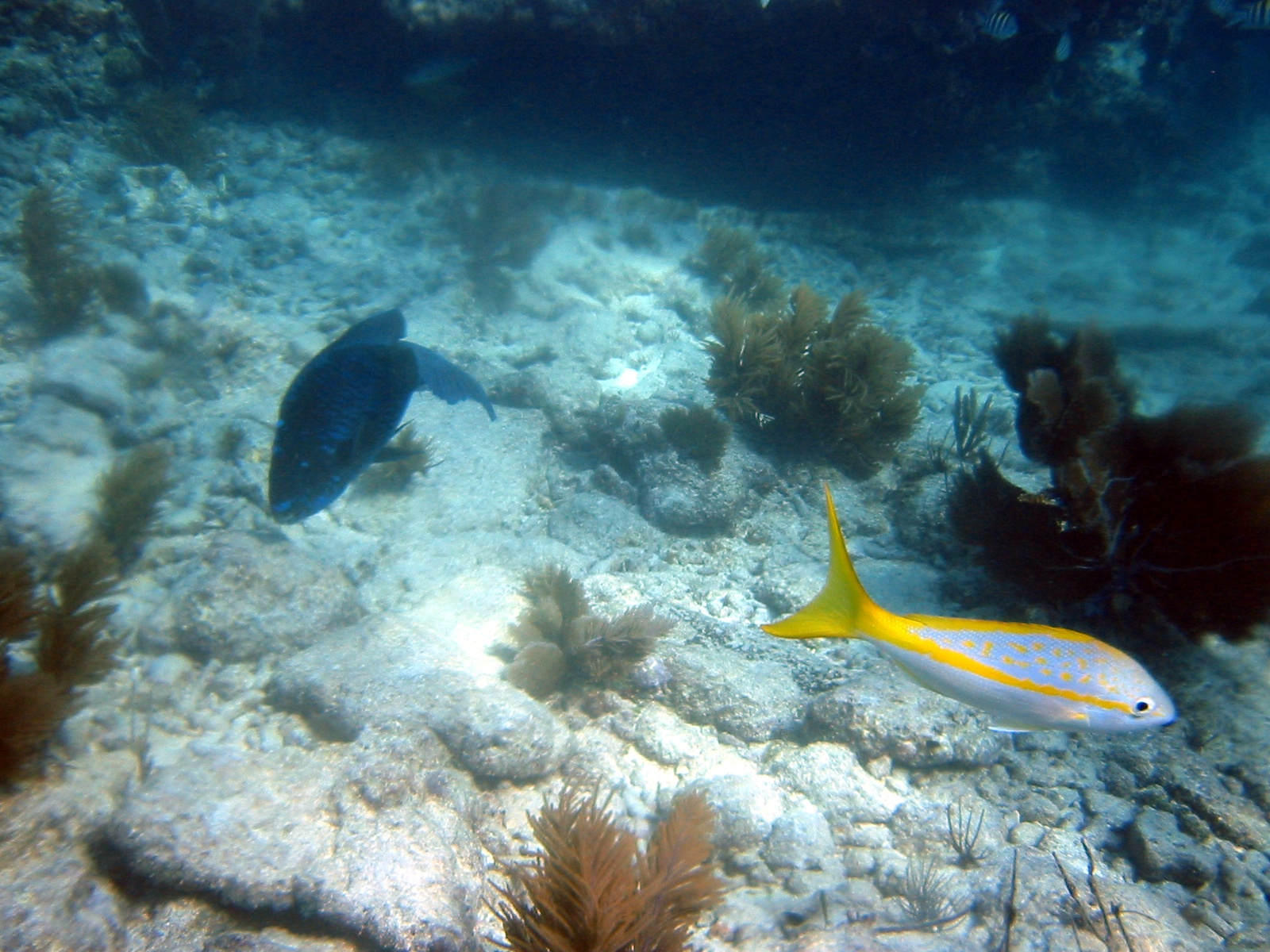
A midnight parrotfish and a yellowtail snapper swimming on Molasses Reef

The reef was marked by an unmanned reef light for most of the 20th century.

On August 4, 1984, the motor vessel Wellwood, a 122-meter freighter carrying pelletized chicken feed, ran aground on Molasses Reef. The total destruction from the grounding included 5,805 square meters of living corals and injury to 75,000 square meters of reef habitat. The vessel was removed by the US Coast Guard. NOAA coordinated an effort to restore damage to the reef, by placing reef modules in the injured areas to provide a substrate for new coral colonization. Biological restoration took place using transplants from Pickles Reef and the facilitation of coral larval settlement. NOAA settled a claim worth $6.275 million with the responsible parties, the Wellwood Shipping Company (owner of the vessel) and the Hanseatic Shipping Company (shipping management company), in 1986, and all payments to NOAA were completed by 2001.

Molasses Reef is a popular scuba diving and snorkeling location with numerous dive sites marked by mooring buoys.

One notable site is at buoy #7 and is variously referred to as the Winch Hole, Windlass Wreck, or The Winch. Here lies the large mechanical winch from the Slobadana, a 170-foot wooden hulled schooner that sank in 1887 after only three years in service. In addition to the winch itself, various mechanical artifacts are scattered over the nearby area. Also, large coral formations with (relatively) deep channels between them make this a popular dive location.
