= John Pennekamp Coral Reef State Park =

State park at Key Largo, Florida, USA

- IUCN category IV (habitat/species management area)
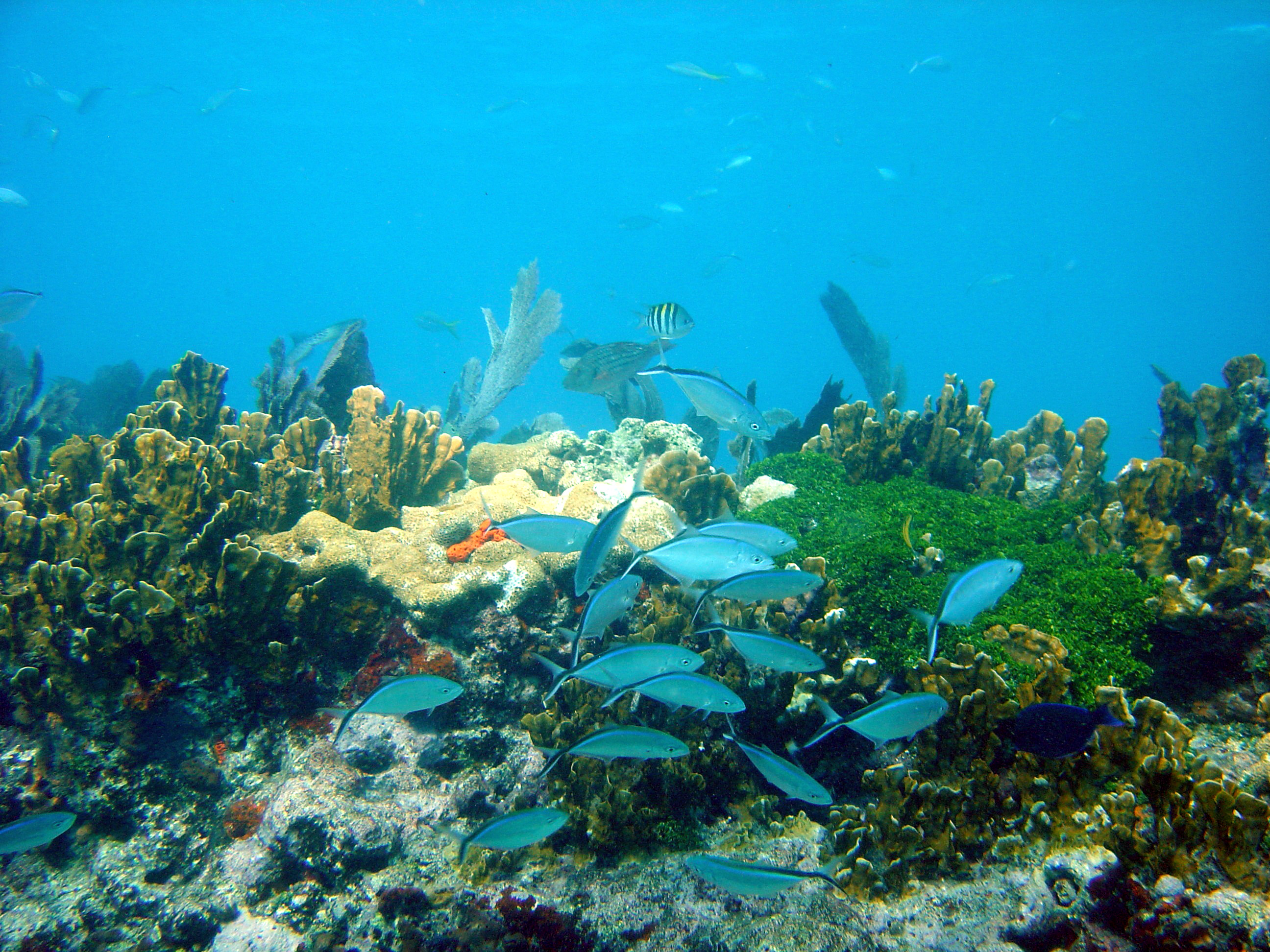

- Location within Florida Location within the United States
- Interactive map of John Pennekamp Coral Reef State Park
- Location: Monroe County, Florida, United States
- Nearest city: Key Largo, Florida
- Coordinates: 25°07′12″N 80°24′18″W
- Area: 53,000 acres (210 km^{2})
- Established: 1963
- Visitors: 1,000,000 (in 2004)
- Governing body: Florida Department of Environmental Protection

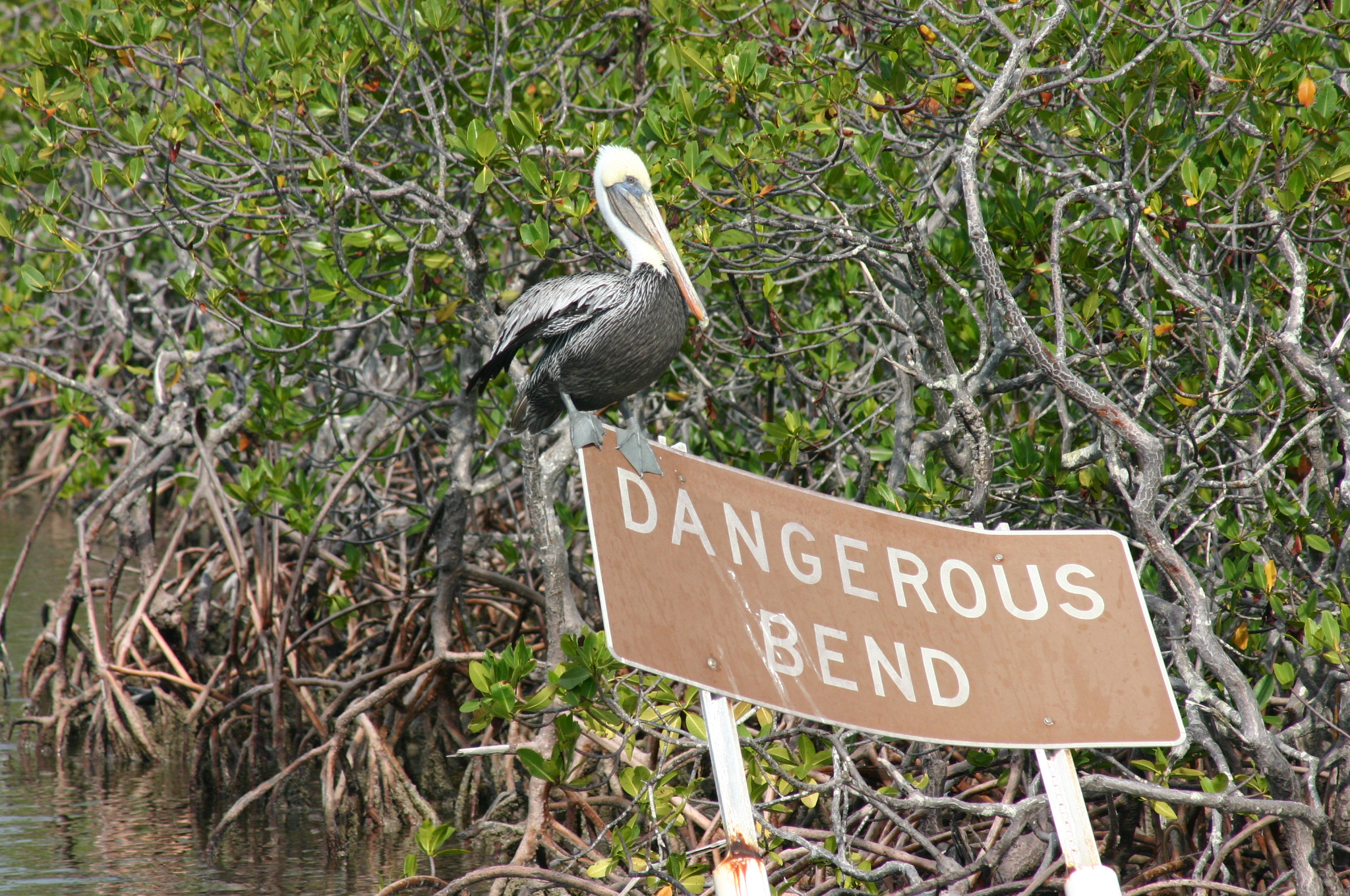
A nonbreeding adult brown pelican is shown in a mangrove forest at John Pennekamp Coral Reef State Park.

John Pennekamp Coral Reef State Park is a Florida State Park located on Key Largo in Florida. It includes around 70 square nautical miles (240 km^{2}; 93 sq mi) of adjacent Atlantic Ocean waters. The park is roughly 25 miles (40 km) long and extends 3 miles (4.8 km) into the Atlantic Ocean along the prominent Hawk Channel passage. It was the first underwater park in the United States. The park was added to the National Register of Historic Places on April 14, 1972. The primary attractions of the park are the coral reefs (such as Molasses Reef) and their associated marine life.

In 2004, the park had more than a million visitors, making it the most popular park in the Florida State Parks system. The Florida Keys and the Flower Garden Banks National Marine Sanctuary in the Gulf of Mexico, near the Texas Gulf Coast, are the only living coral reef formations in the continental United States.

== History ==
Plans to designate the reefs off Key Largo for a park started in the 1930s. The state-sanctioned Everglades National Park Commission proposed a national park for the Everglades, including the reefs off Key Largo. Opposition from property owners, outdoorsmen, and Monroe County commissioners stopped the plan. When Everglades National Park was created in 1947, the boundaries did not include Key Largo or any of the reefs.

By the late 1950s, citizens were growing concerned about the damage occurring to the reefs along the Florida Keys. Seashells, corals, sponges, seahorses, and other marine life were being hammered, chiseled, and even dynamited from the reefs to provide souvenirs for tourists. Gilbert L. Voss of the Marine Institute of Miami and John D. Pennekamp, an editor with the Miami Herald, teamed up to lead a fight to protect the reefs from further damage. Pennekamp had strong credentials for the fight. He had been active in establishing Everglades National Park, had been the first chairman of the Florida Board of Parks and Historic Memorials, and had been a consultant with the United States Fish and Wildlife Service.

These efforts led the Florida Board of Parks and Historic Memorials to designate the state-controlled reefs off Key Largo a permanent preserve. In the spring of 1960, President Dwight D. Eisenhower proclaimed the adjacent, federally controlled area of the reefs as the Key Largo Coral Reef Preserve. Florida Governor Leroy Collins later changed the name of the park to John Pennekamp Coral Reef State Park, in recognition of John Pennekamp's efforts to save marine life. A land base and access to U.S. 1 (the Overseas Highway) were acquired by purchase and donation. The park opened in 1963.* History of John Pennekamp State Park at Florida Keys History Museum

== Recreational activities ==
The reefs may be viewed from glass-bottomed boats, snorkeling, and scuba diving above the coral formations. Other activities available in the park are canoeing, kayaking, fishing, hiking, swimming, and wildlife viewing. The park offers tropical hammocks and a picnic area with available grills. Full-facility and youth/group campgrounds are available.

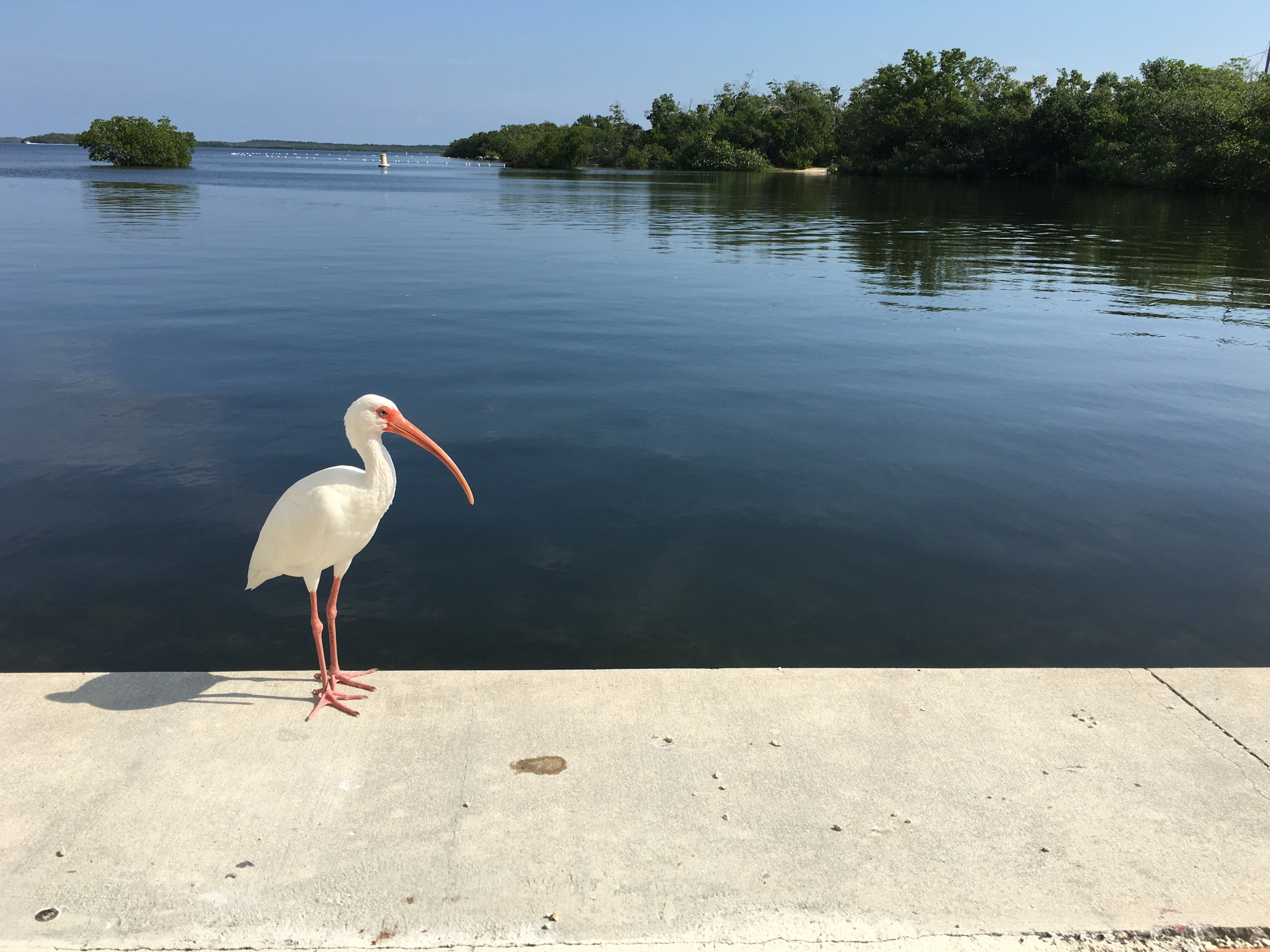
An ibis on the waterfront of Largo Sound.

The visitor center features a 30,000-US-gallon (110,000 L; 25,000 imp gal) saltwater aquarium and six smaller aquaria. The state park also has a natural history exhibit about the park's different biological communities and ecosystems and a theater showing nature Films and videos.

== Christ of the Abyss ==
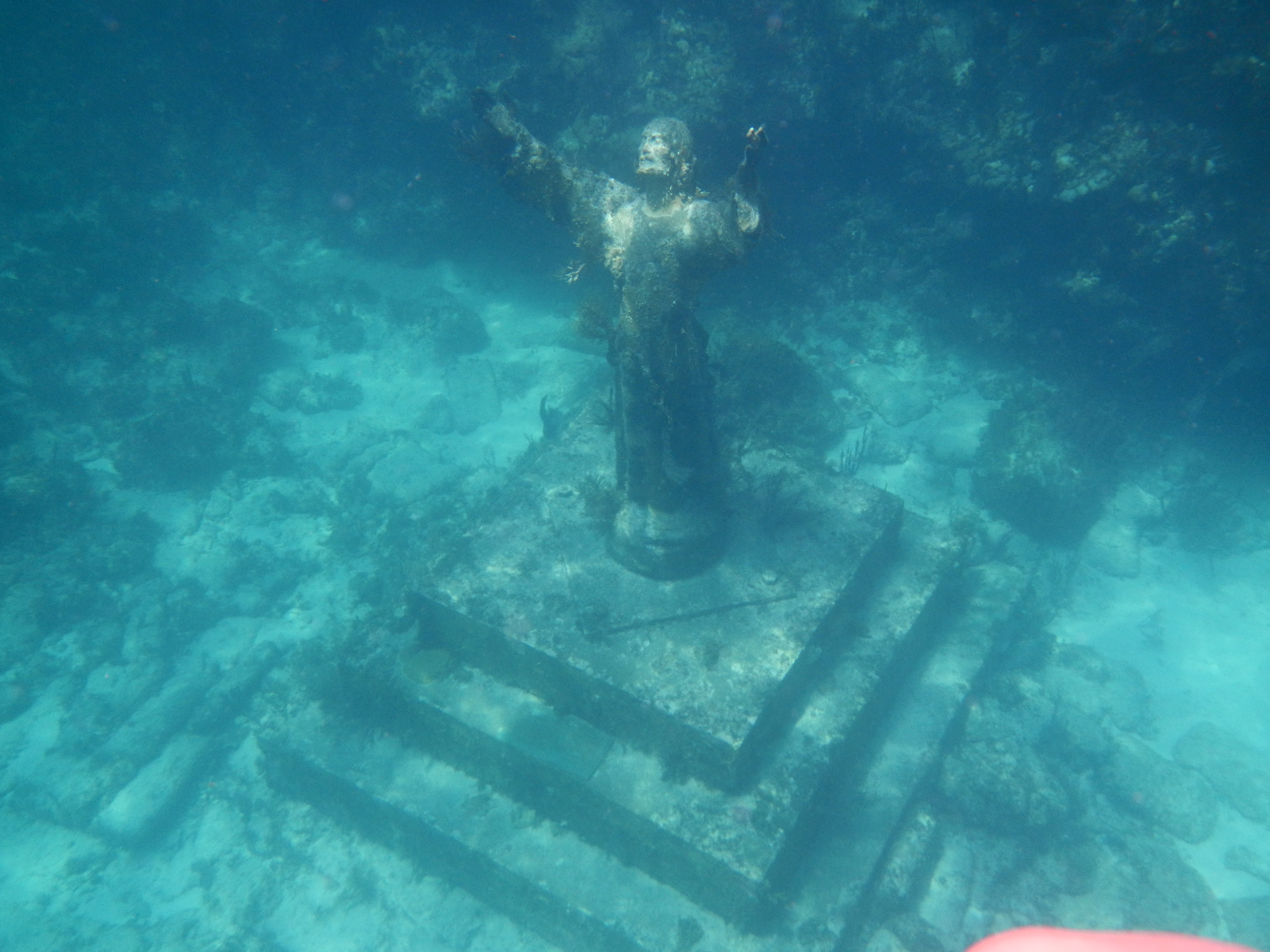
The underwater Christ of the Abyss statue

One of the most famous sites in the Pennekamp Coral Reef State Park is the Christ of the Abyss, located near North Dry Rocks, and within the existing Key Largo management area that was incorporated into the Florida Keys National Marine Sanctuary "on November 16, 1990". The 8 1/2-foot-tall (2.6 m) statue of Jesus Christ weighs 4,000 pounds (1,800 kg) and stands in nearly 25 feet (7.6 m) of water. It is a popular site for scuba divers and snorkelers. The statue is located at latitude 25.123373°N and longitude 80.297073°W.

The statue is a third casting of Il Cristo Degli Abissi in the Mediterranean Sea near Genoa, Italy, which was placed there in 1954. The Christ of the Abyss was donated to the Underwater Society of America in 1961 by Italian scuba entrepreneur Egidio Cressi and placed in its current location in 1965. In their current positions, the two statues face each other.

== Climate ==
John Pennekamp has a tropical monsoon climate (Köppen Am).

Climate data for John Pennekamp Coral Reef State Park (1991–2020 normals, extremes 2004–present)
Month	Jan	Feb	Mar	Apr	May	Jun	Jul	Aug	Sep	Oct	Nov	Dec	Year
Record high °F (°C)	84 (29)	89 (32)	87 (31)	93 (34)	93 (34)	94 (34)	95 (35)	93 (34)	97 (36)	91 (33)	88 (31)	86 (30)	97 (36)
Mean maximum °F (°C)	81.7 (27.6)	83.1 (28.4)	85.0 (29.4)	87.0 (30.6)	88.4 (31.3)	90.9 (32.7)	91.9 (33.3)	91.9 (33.3)	90.9 (32.7)	89.0 (31.7)	85.2 (29.6)	83.1 (28.4)	92.9 (33.8)
Mean daily maximum °F (°C)	76.2 (24.6)	78.0 (25.6)	79.7 (26.5)	82.5 (28.1)	85.1 (29.5)	88.1 (31.2)	89.8 (32.1)	90.1 (32.3)	88.8 (31.6)	85.9 (29.9)	81.4 (27.4)	78.1 (25.6)	83.6 (28.7)
Mean daily minimum °F (°C)	62.6 (17.0)	64.5 (18.1)	66.8 (19.3)	70.7 (21.5)	74.2 (23.4)	77.2 (25.1)	78.5 (25.8)	78.8 (26.0)	77.8 (25.4)	75.3 (24.1)	69.9 (21.1)	65.8 (18.8)	71.8 (22.1)
Mean minimum °F (°C)	45.8 (7.7)	49.2 (9.6)	52.5 (11.4)	59.2 (15.1)	66.8 (19.3)	71.4 (21.9)	72.8 (22.7)	72.8 (22.7)	72.1 (22.3)	65.4 (18.6)	57.4 (14.1)	51.7 (10.9)	43.5 (6.4)
Record low °F (°C)	34 (1)	38 (3)	44 (7)	52 (11)	60 (16)	68 (20)	70 (21)	71 (22)	65 (18)	54 (12)	46 (8)	37 (3)	34 (1)
Average precipitation inches (mm)	2.13 (54)	2.01 (51)	2.22 (56)	3.33 (85)	4.76 (121)	7.91 (201)	5.81 (148)	6.89 (175)	8.18 (208)	7.87 (200)	3.31 (84)	2.53 (64)	56.95 (1,447)
Average precipitation days (≥ 0.01 in)	7.5	6.2	5.1	6.7	7.1	10.9	13.0	14.5	16.1	11.6	8.9	7.9	115.5
Source: NOAA (precip days 2006–2020)

== Gallery ==
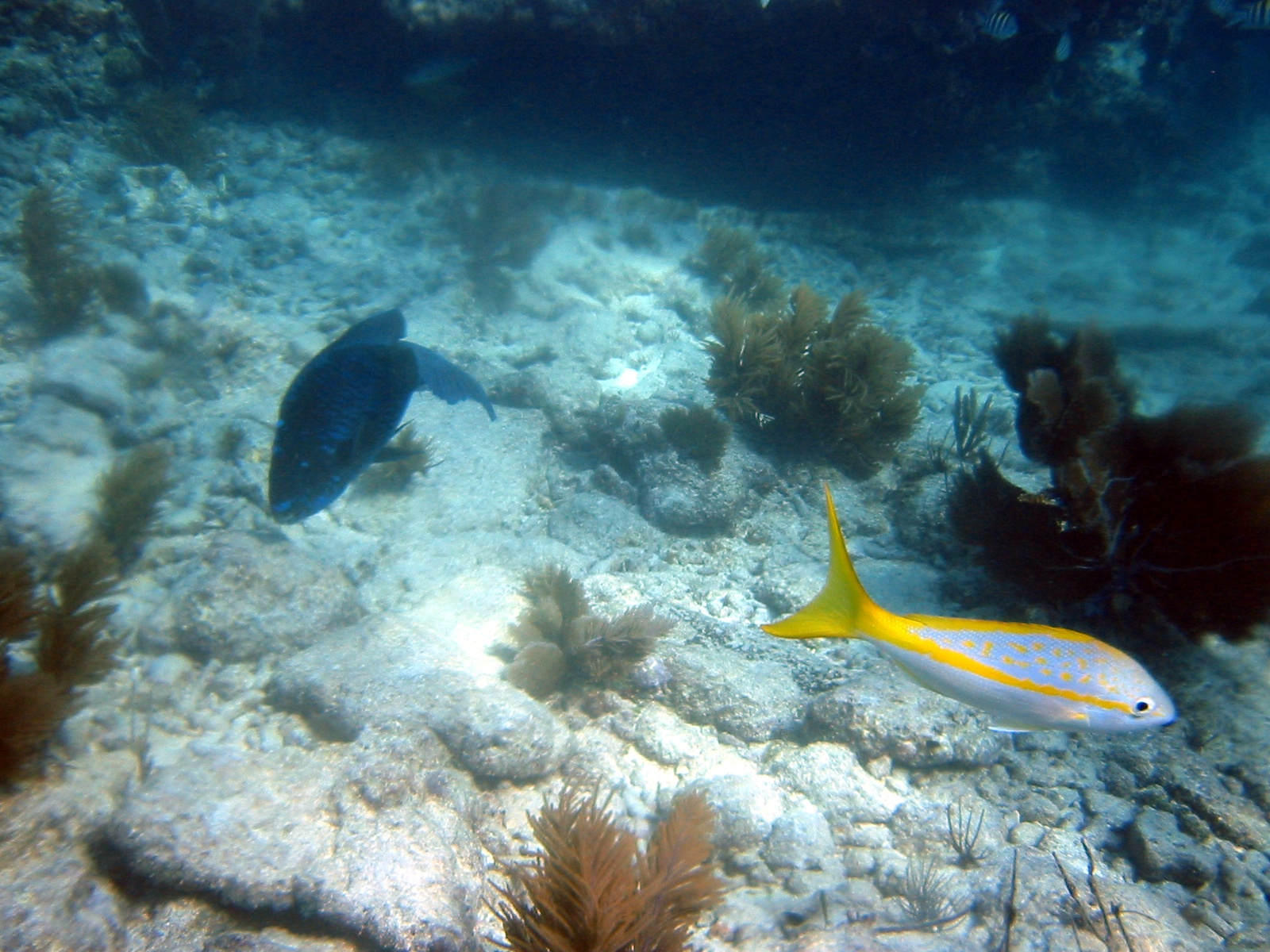
A midnight parrotfish and a yellowtail snapper swimming on Molasses Reef

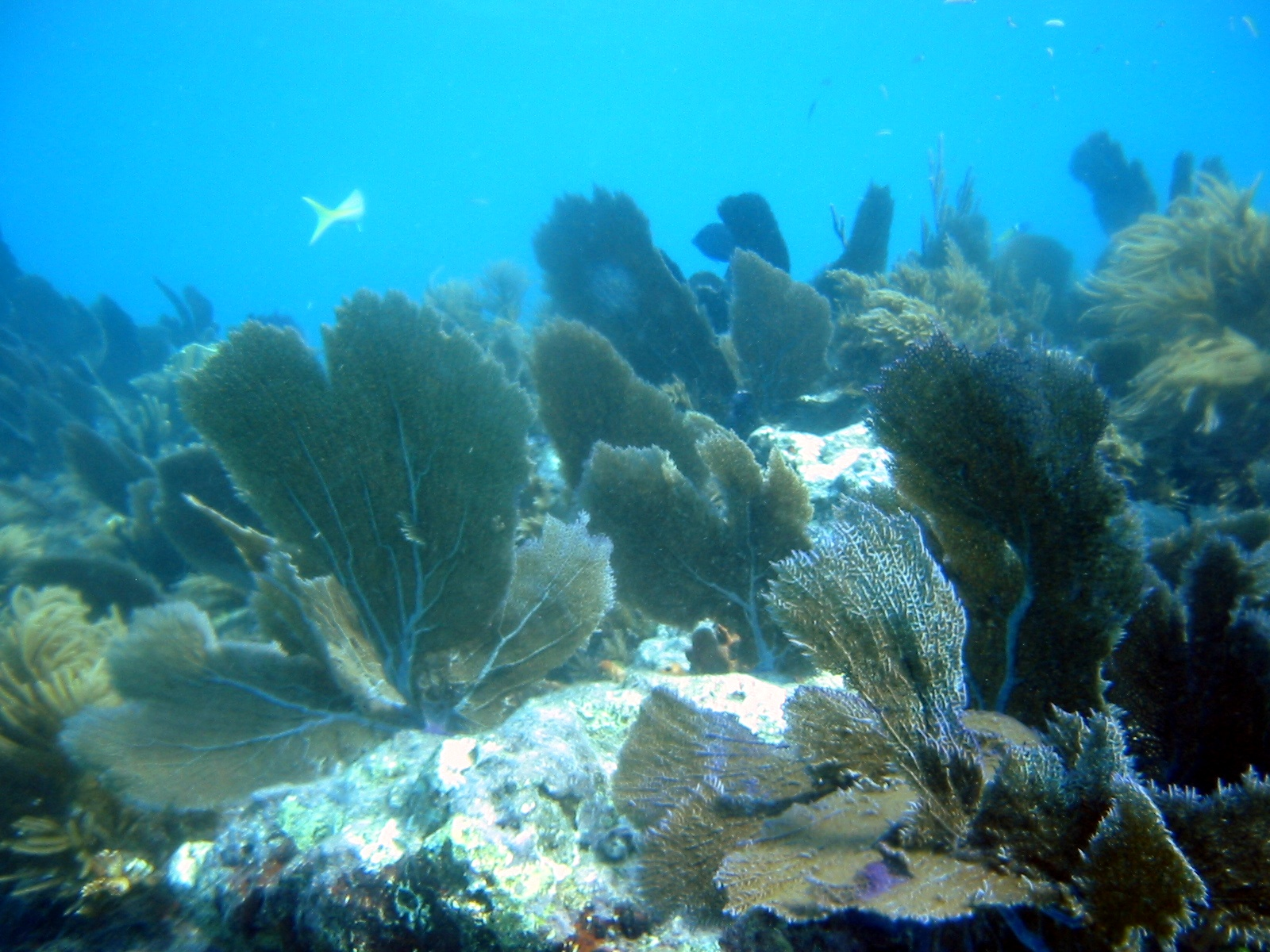
Various soft corals at Molasses Reef

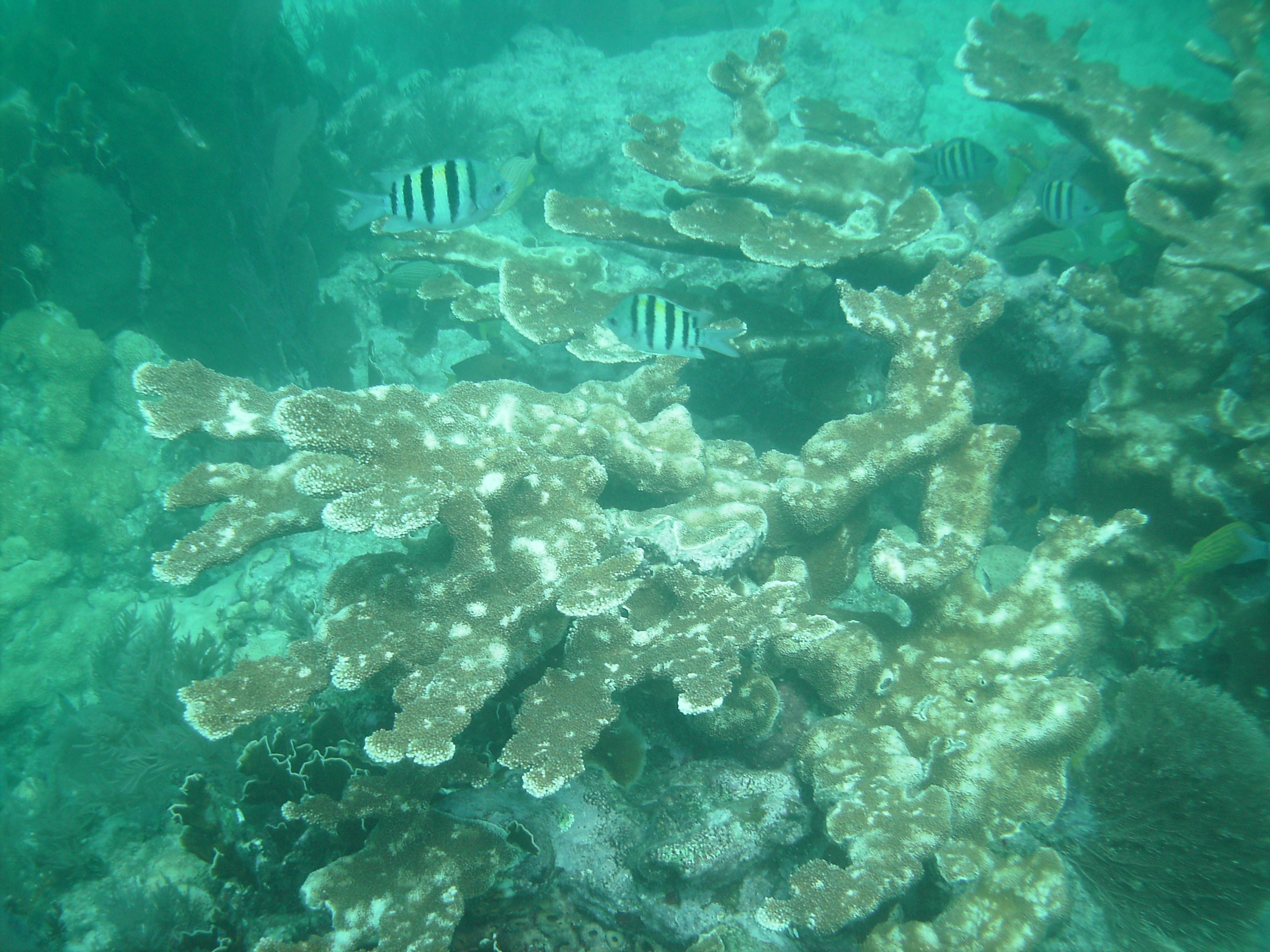
Elkhorn coral (Acropora palmata) at Molasses Reef

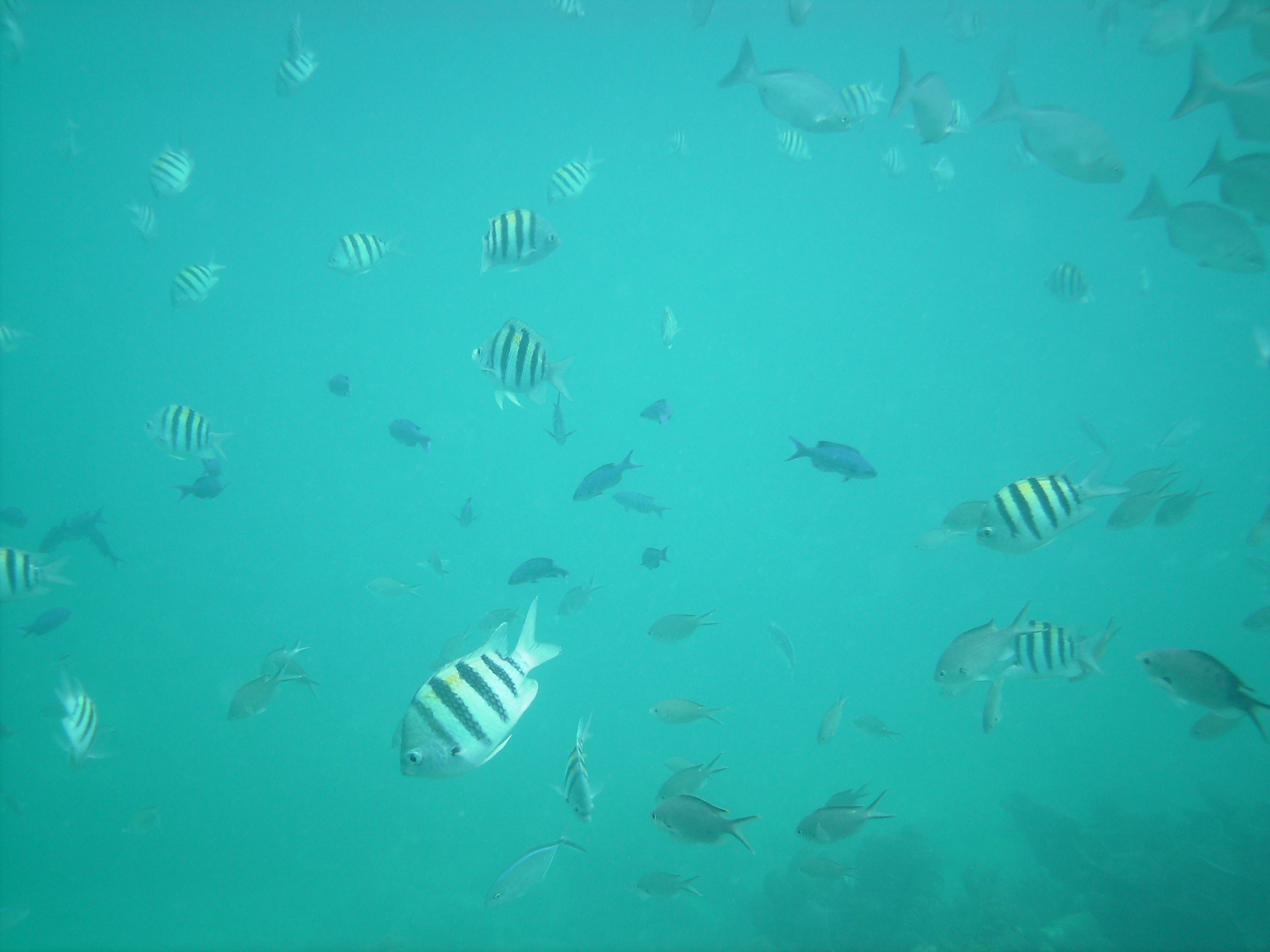
Various fish species (chubs, blue chromis, sergeant majors, bar jacks) at Molasses Reef

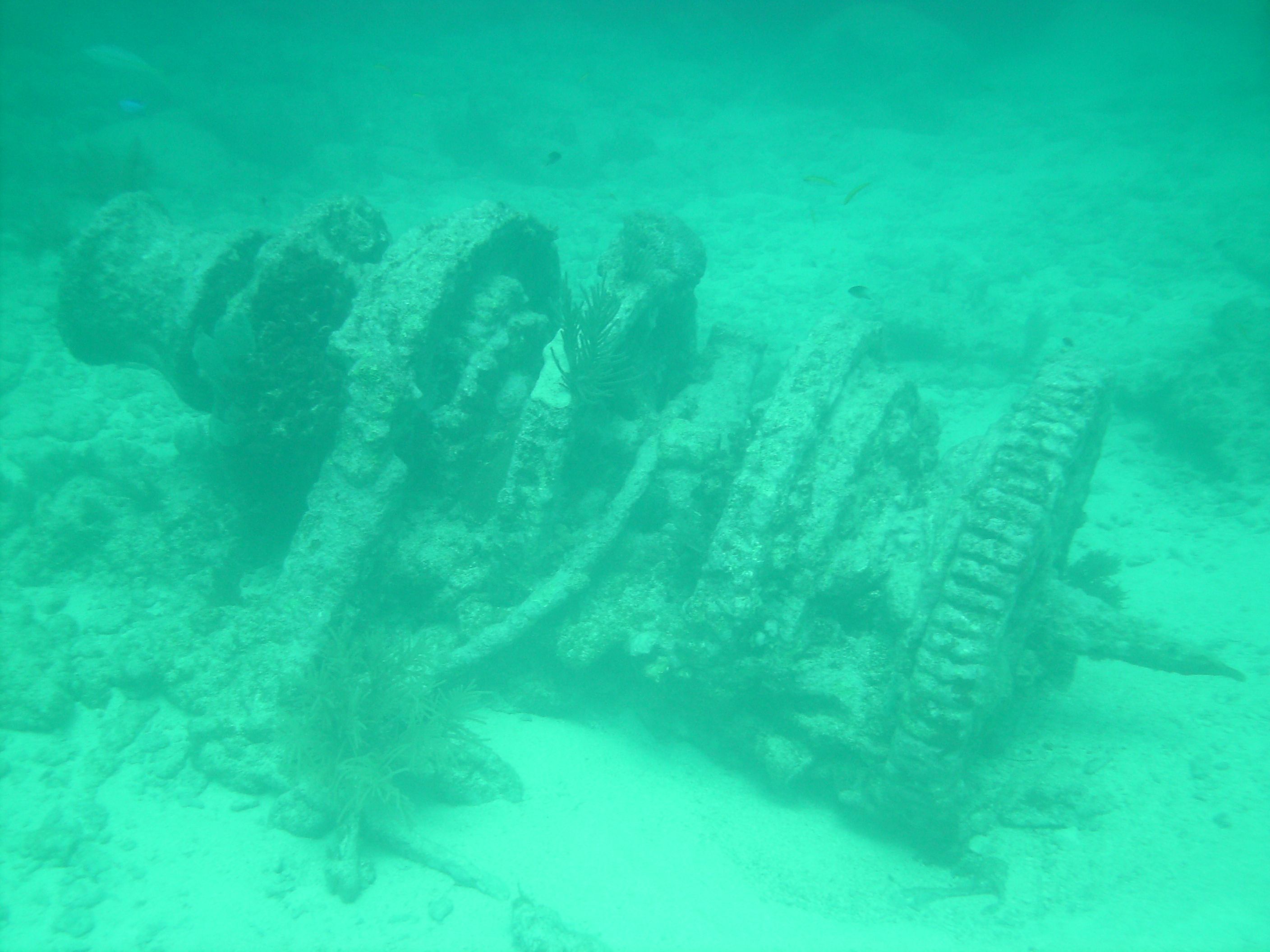
A ship winch at Molasses Reef

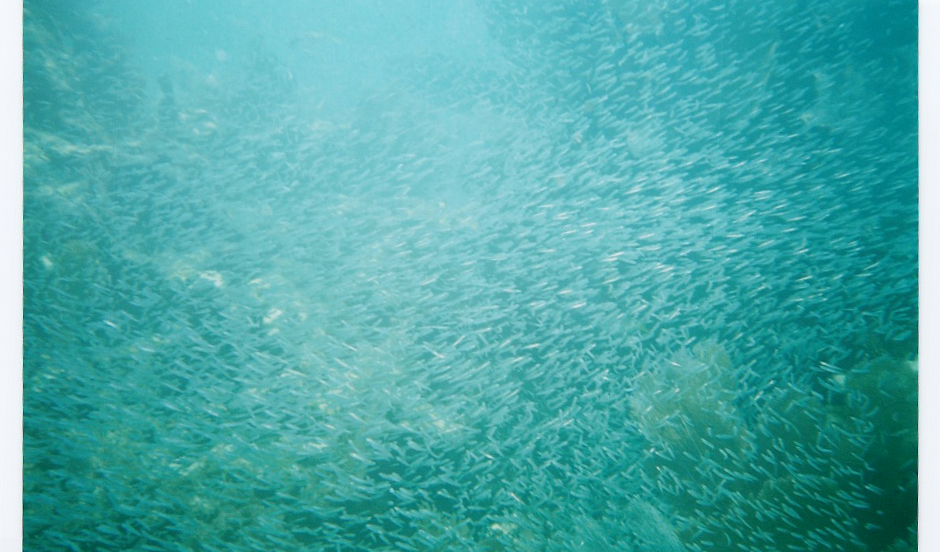
Minnow Cave

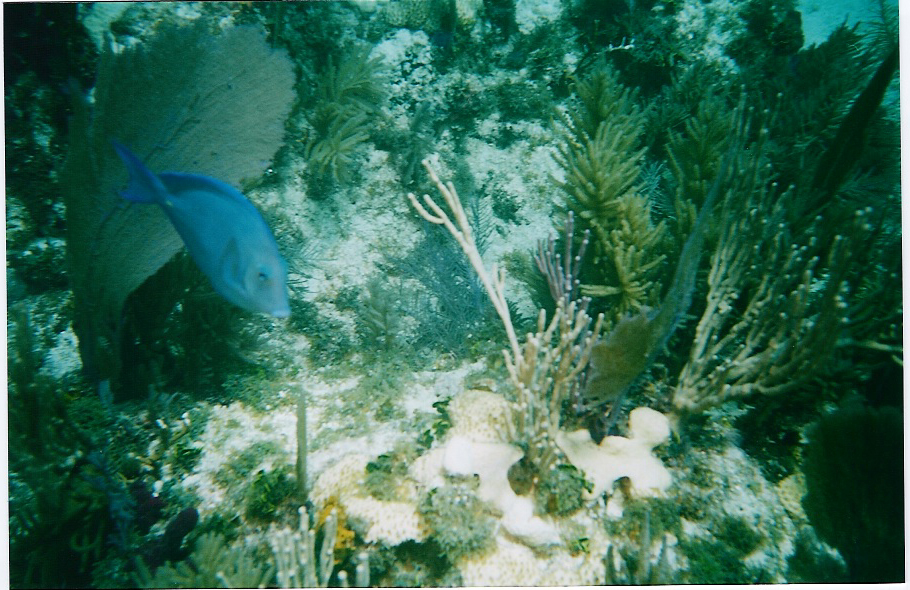
Blue tang among coral

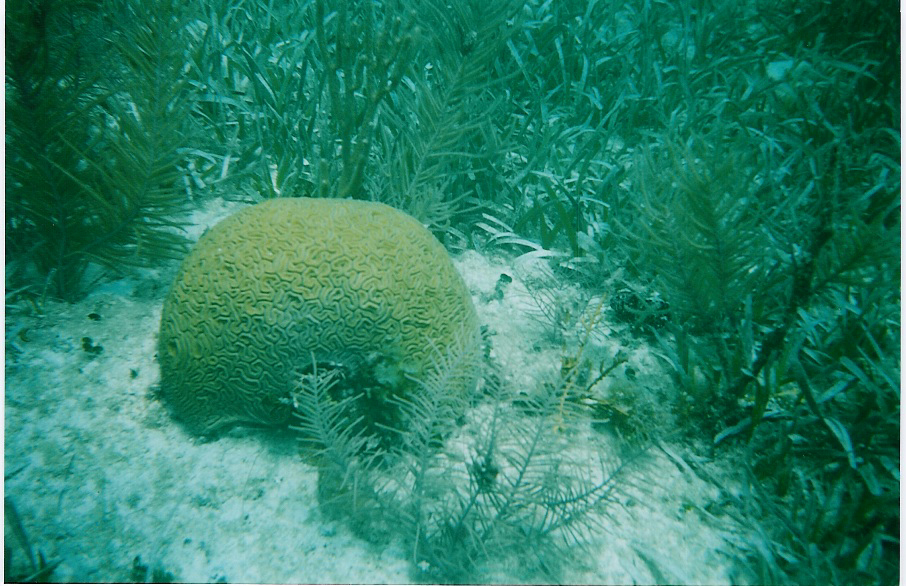
Brain coral

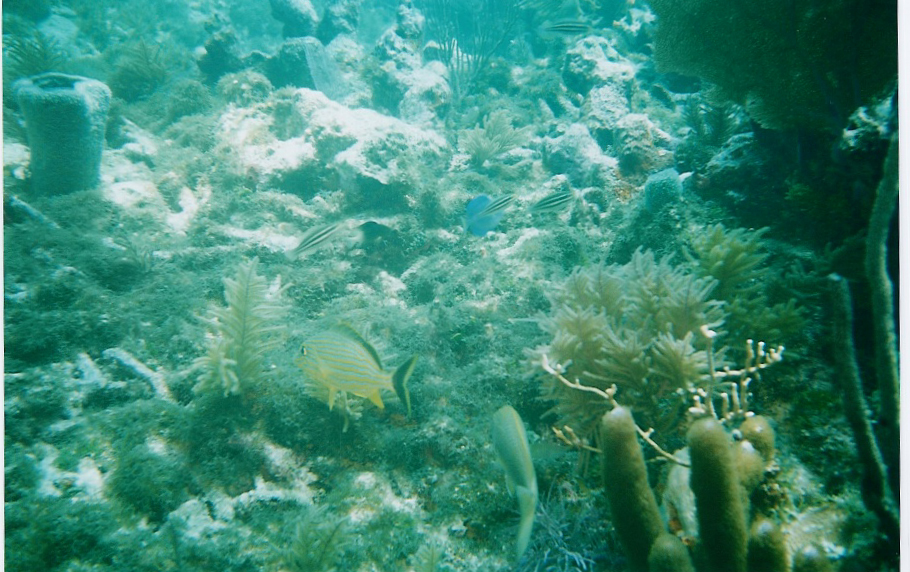
Various fish among coral

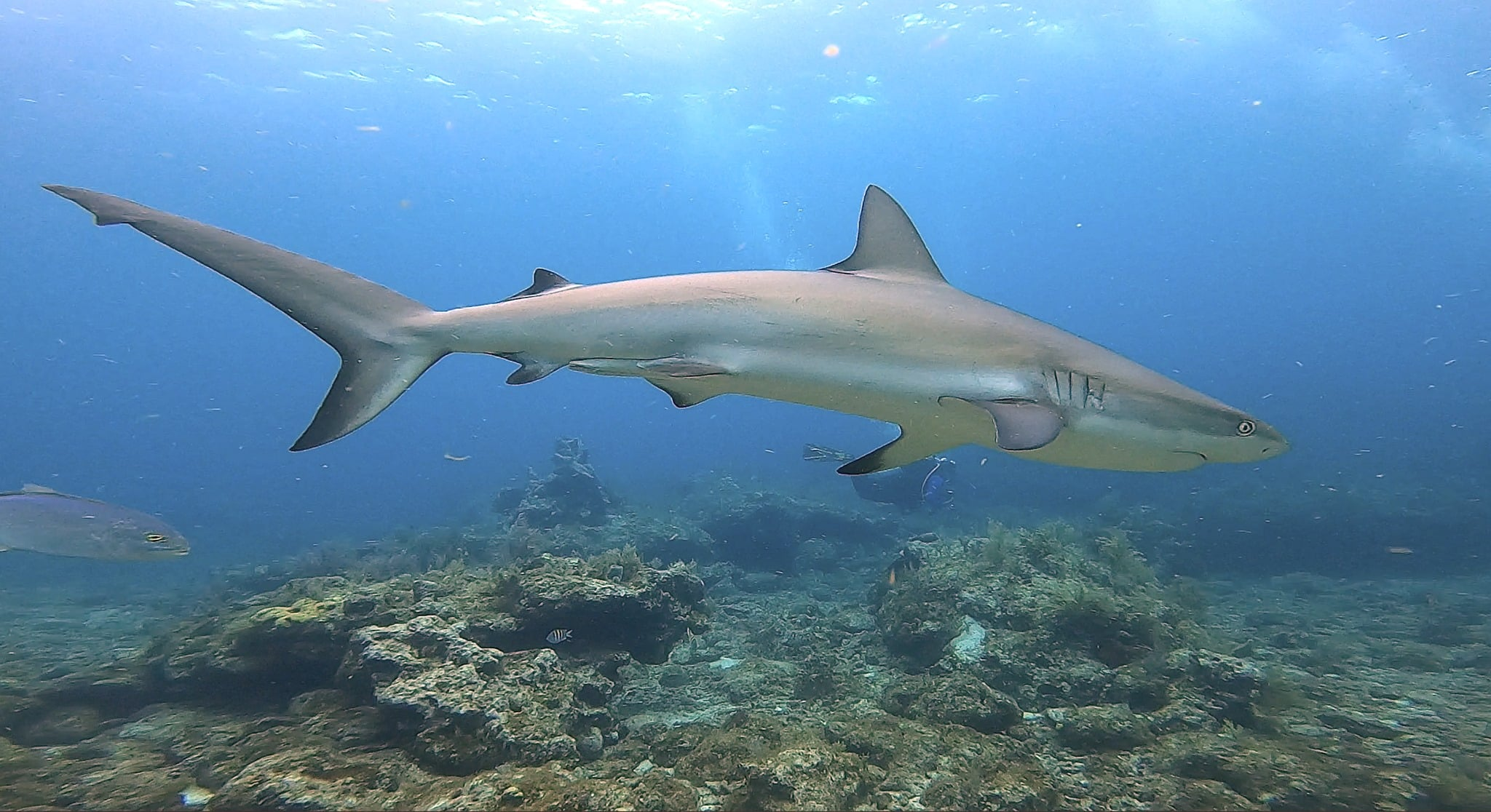
Caribbean Reef Shark at North Dry Rocks, Key Largo

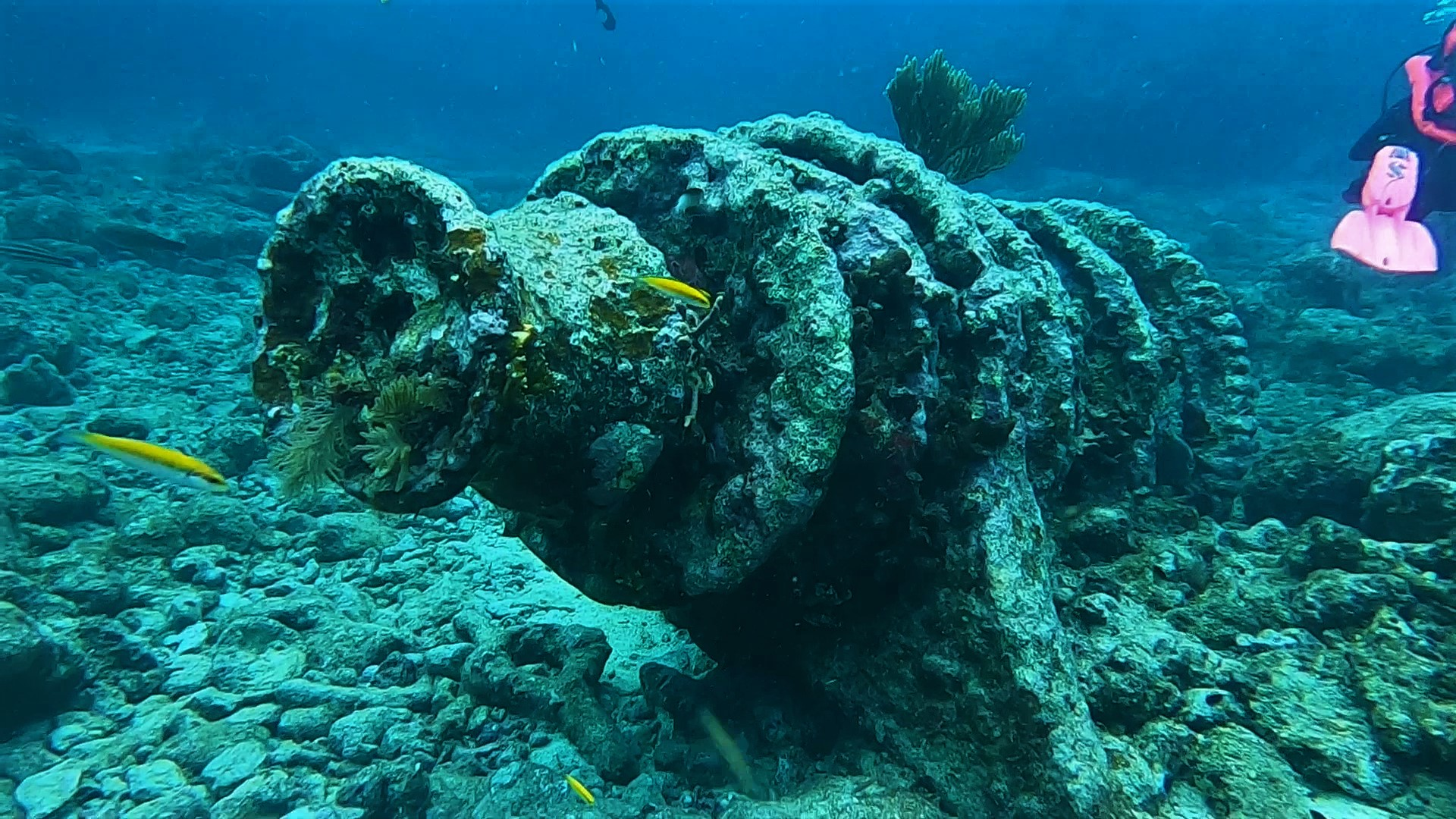
The Winch at Molasses Reef Key Largo
