= 1894 Florida Panhandle hurricane =

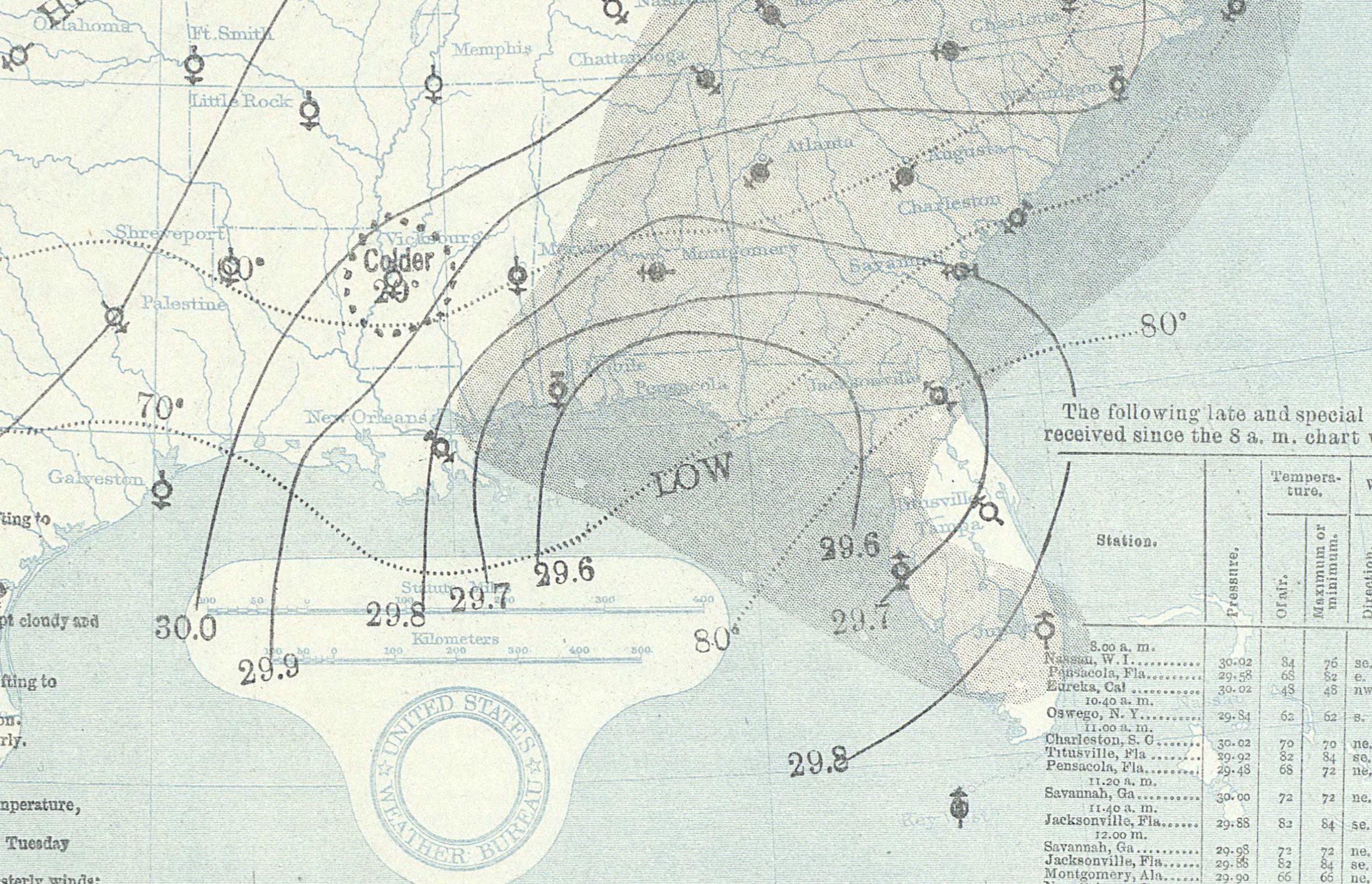
- Weather map of the hurricane making landfall in the Florida Panhandle at peak intensity on October 8

Meteorological history
- Formed: October 1, 1894
- Dissipated: October 10, 1894

Category 3-equivalent tropical cyclone
- 1-minute sustained (SSHWS/NWS)
- Highest winds: 195 km/h (120 mph)
- Lowest pressure: 955 hPa (mbar); 28.20 inHg

Overall effects
- Fatalities: At least 28
- Damage: >$200,000 (1894 USD)
- Areas affected: Cuba, East Coast of the United States, Atlantic Canada
- Part of the 1894 Atlantic hurricane season

The 1894 Florida Panhandle hurricane devastated the northern parts of the state in early October. First observed over the southwestern Caribbean Sea on October 1, the system moved northwestward and intensified into a hurricane on October 3 while passing northeast of Honduras. Late on the October 5, the cyclone passed near western Cuba as it entered the Gulf of Mexico. The hurricane strengthened farther, peaking as a Category 3 hurricane on the present-day Saffir–Simpson scale. After turning northward and then northeastward late on October 8, the system struck near Panama City, Florida, early the next day. The hurricane weakened quickly as it moved inland, deteriorating to a tropical storm over South Carolina on October 9. However, the storm emerged into the Atlantic Ocean early on the following day and soon re-strengthened into a hurricane. On October 10, the system made landfall near Bellport, New York, as a Category 1 with winds of 85 mph (140 km/h), shortly before striking Connecticut and weakening to a tropical storm. Becoming extratropical over Maine late on October 10, the storm's remnants continued northeastward into Atlantic Canada before dissipating over Labrador on October 12.

The hurricane dropped heavy rains over western Cuba, flooding a few towns. Storm surge impacted Louisiana and Mississippi, submerging land south of Pointe à la Hache in the former, while washing away a 1,000 ft (300 m) section of railroad and wrecking vessels on Horn Island in the latter. Winds caused some damage, especially in Mississippi City, Mississippi, where several outbuildings and a church were destroyed. In Florida, extensive impact occurred, with the Weather Bureau reporting that every town between Jacksonville and Pensacola sustained damage, especially to crops. Seventeen people died in Florida, fifteen due to vessels wrecking at Sand Island, near St. George Island. At least $100,000 (1894 USD) in damage occurred in Florida. (Note: All damage figures are in 1894 USD, unless otherwise noted) The storm impacted much of the rest of the East Coast of the United States, especially New Jersey and New York. In the former, one person died in Englewood after a chimney fell inside a home. The New York City area suffered extensively, with Long Island City alone reporting about $100,000 in damage. Winds generated by the storm toppled a seven-story building under construction onto a tenement, killing 10 people and seriously injuring 15 others.

== Meteorological history ==
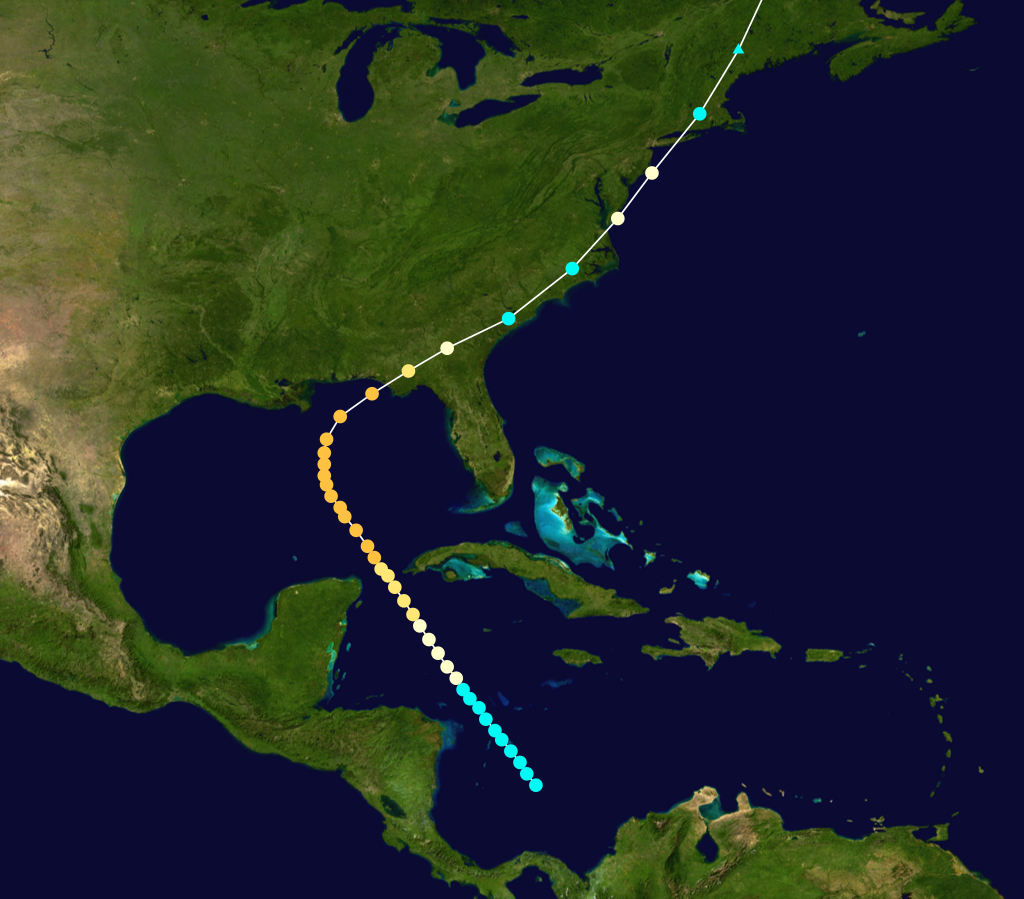
Map plotting the storm's track and intensity, according to the Saffir–Simpson scale Map key Saffir–Simpson scale Tropical depression (≤38 mph, ≤62 km/h) Tropical storm (39–73 mph, 63–118 km/h) Category 1 (74–95 mph, 119–153 km/h) Category 2 (96–110 mph, 154–177 km/h) Category 3 (111–129 mph, 178–208 km/h) Category 4 (130–156 mph, 209–251 km/h) Category 5 (≥157 mph, ≥252 km/h) Unknown Storm type Tropical cyclone Subtropical cyclone Extratropical cyclone, remnant low, tropical disturbance, or monsoon depression

Atmospheric pressures fell in Nicaragua and Panama and in the Caribbean Sea offshore Colombia on October 1. Consequently, the official track for this cyclone begins at 00:00 UTC on October 1 approximately 175 mi (280 km) east of San Andrés island. Beginning as a 40 mph (65 km/h)-tropical storm, the system slowed intensified as it headed northwestward, though the Monthly Weather Review noted that the cyclone "apparently did not grow in size". Around 12:00 UTC on October 3, the system strengthened into a hurricane while passing northeast of Honduras and then to a Category 2 hurricane on the modern-day Saffir–Simpson scale in the northwestern Caribbean on October 4. Late on the following day, the cyclone crossed between Cuba and the Yucatán Peninsula, passing about 45 mi (70 km) west of Cabo San Antonio. As the system entered the Gulf of Mexico early on October 6, it intensified into a Category 3. The hurricane strengthened slightly further in the Gulf of Mexico, peaking with maximum sustained winds of 120 mph (195 km/h) around 12:00 UTC.

Around midday on October 7, the cyclone turned northward, before curving again to the northeast late on October 8. Around 03:00 UTC on the following day, the system made landfall near Panama City, Florida, at the same intensity, based on the Johann Ludwig observing a barometric pressure of 961 mbar (28.4 inHg) at 14:00 UTC on October 6. A 2003 reanalysis of the storm estimated that the barometric pressure fell to 955 mbar (28.2 inHg) at landfall, the lowest in relation to the cyclone. The hurricane weakened quickly as it moved inland, deteriorating to a tropical storm over South Carolina by 18:00 UTC on October 9. However, the storm emerged into the Atlantic Ocean early on the following day and soon became a hurricane again.

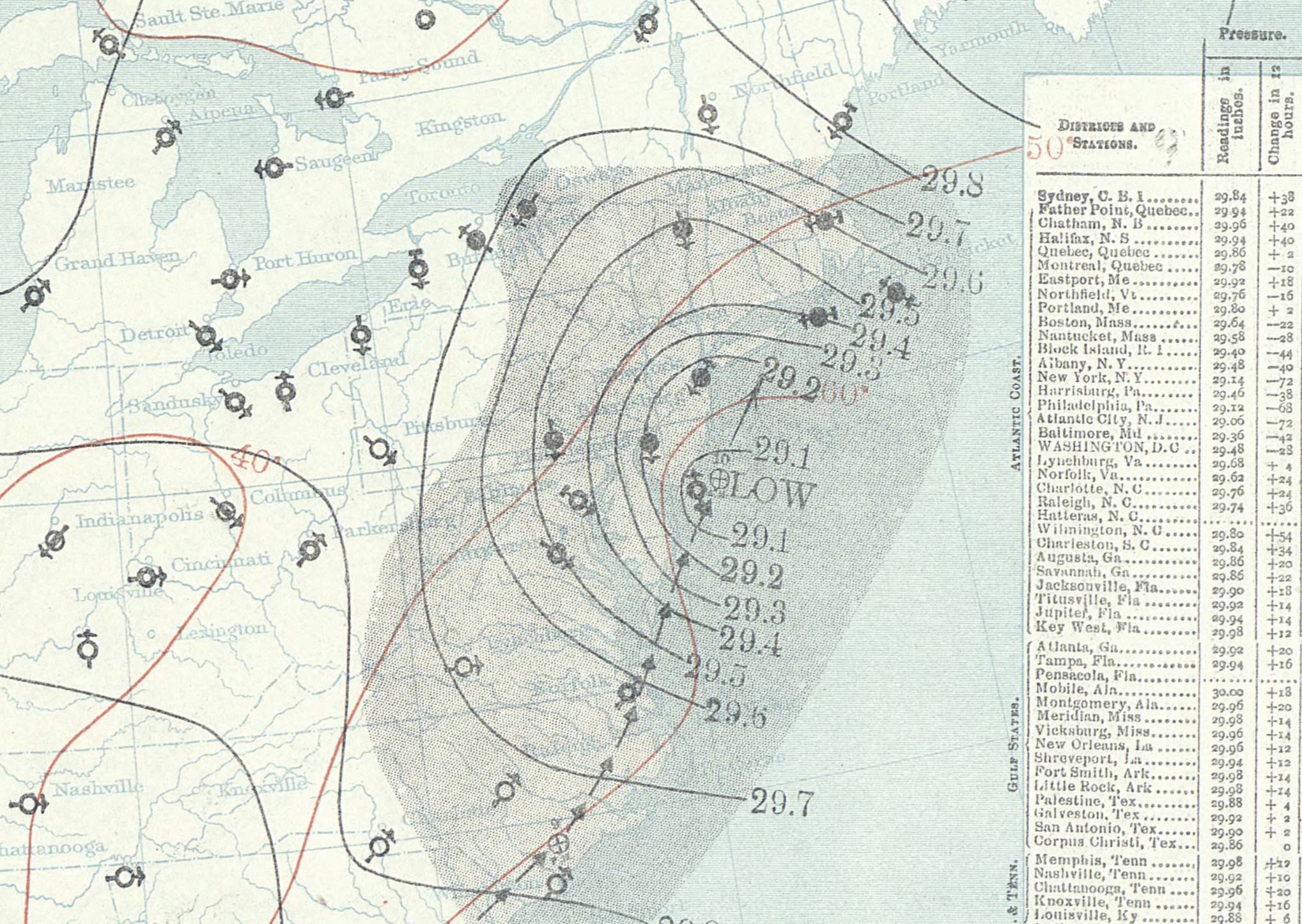
Weather map of the hurricane approaching landfall in Long Island on October 10

Around 15:00 UTC on October 10, then system made landfall near Bellport, New York, on Long Island with winds of 85 mph (140 km/h), based on Atlantic City, New Jersey, recording a barometric pressure of 984 mbar (29.1 inHg). The cyclone struck Connecticut and weakened to a tropical storm, shortly before transitioning into an extratropical cyclone over western Maine. Thereafter, the extratropical remnants of the storm continued northeastward into Atlantic Canada, until dissipating over Labrador on October 12.

A reanalysis study by climate researcher Michael Chenoweth, published in 2014, proposed that this storm actually developed near the Caribbean coast of Colombia on September 26. After initially drifting west-northwestward, the cyclone moves in a path similar to that indicated in HURDAT. However, Chenoweth argued that the cyclone made landfall farther southeast in Florida, near Apalachicola instead.

== Impact ==
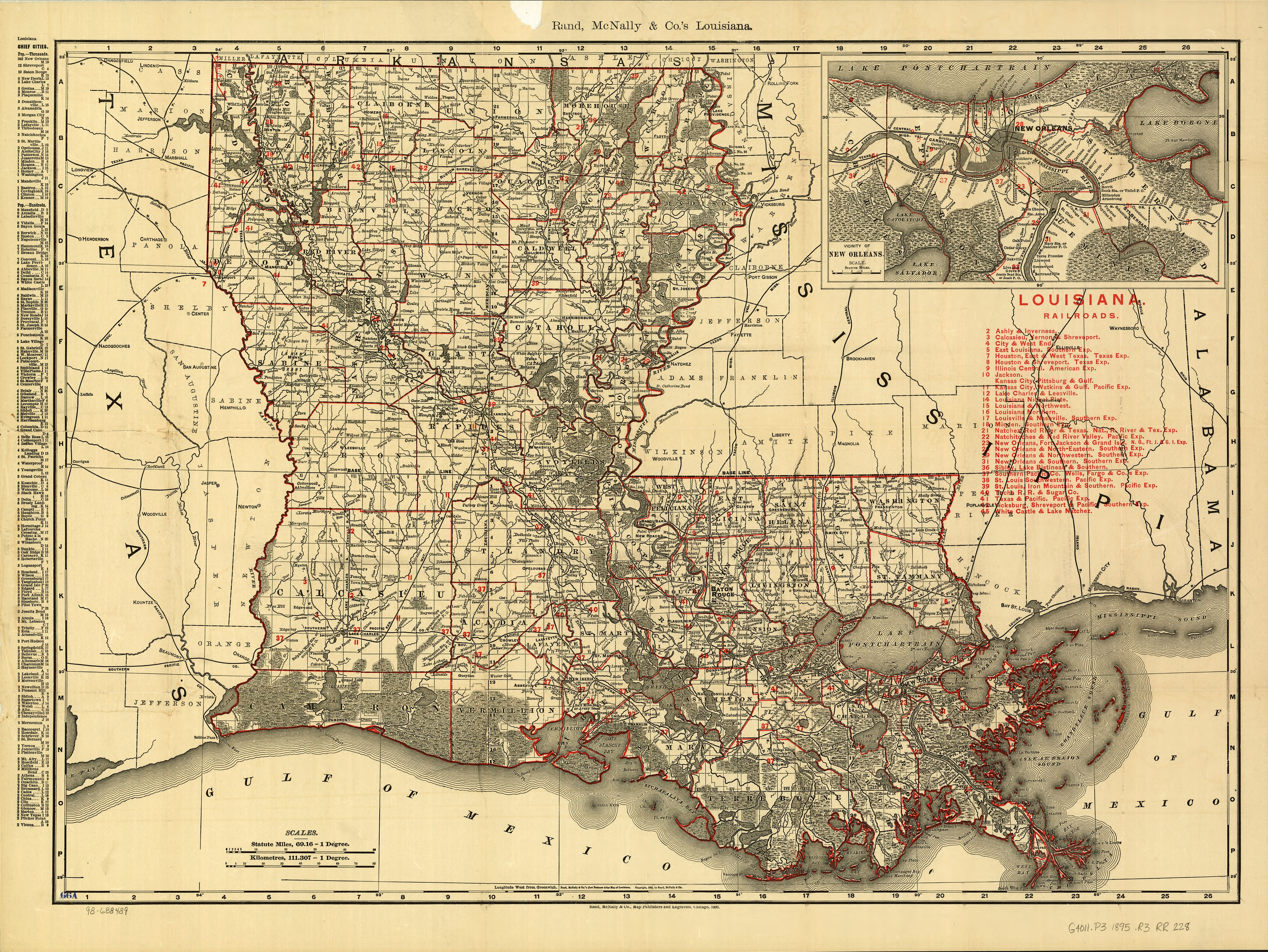
1896 map of Louisiana

In Cuba, the storm brought heavy rainfall and floods from Santa Clara westward. The worst impacts occurred in Pinar del Río Province – Cuba's westernmost province – where rivers in the Vuelta Abajo region overflowed. News reports described the towns of Guara, Pinar del Río, and San Cristóbal as being "under water". Railway service was suspended.

Impacts along the Gulf Coast of the United States extended as far west as Louisiana. Little impact occurred in New Orleans other than in West End, where water entered the yards of several cottages and completely submerged the eastern sections of the neighborhood after about 10 ft (3.0 m) of revetment atop the levees washed away. One cottage was swept away and destroyed. The yacht club suffered about $500 in damage. Damage in the West End neighborhood totaled about $850. Additionally, Bayou St. John overflowed and left roads near Spanish Fort inundated with about 2 ft (0.61 m) of water. Farther south, significant losses to orange, rice, and sugarcane crops occurred between Bohemia and Favrot, although little crop damage was noted at the nearby community of Pointe à la Hache. There, all land was submerged in at least 6 in (150 mm) of water. From Pointe à la Hache southward, "the whole country was underwater, no landmarks visible.", according to The Daily Picayune. A train heading from Buras to Algiers was delayed due to several uprooted trees along the tracks.

The hurricane produced rainfall, high tides, and wind along coastal Mississippi. In Mississippi City, winds destroyed a black church that had been knocked off its foundation during a hurricane in the previous year, while the storm also reportedly demolished several outbuildings and uprooted trees in the Handsboro section. Wind gusts reached 60 mph (97 km/h) in Ocean Springs, leaving little wind damage other than a few downed fences. Rough seas washed out approximately 1,000 ft (300 m) of the Louisville and Nashville Railroad between West Pascagoula and Scanton (modern-day Pascagoula), but it was quickly repaired. Several vessels wrecked at Horn Island. In Alabama, the storm produced sustained winds up to 40 mph (64 km/h) at Mobile, causing little impact other than downed telegraph wires and isolated power outages.

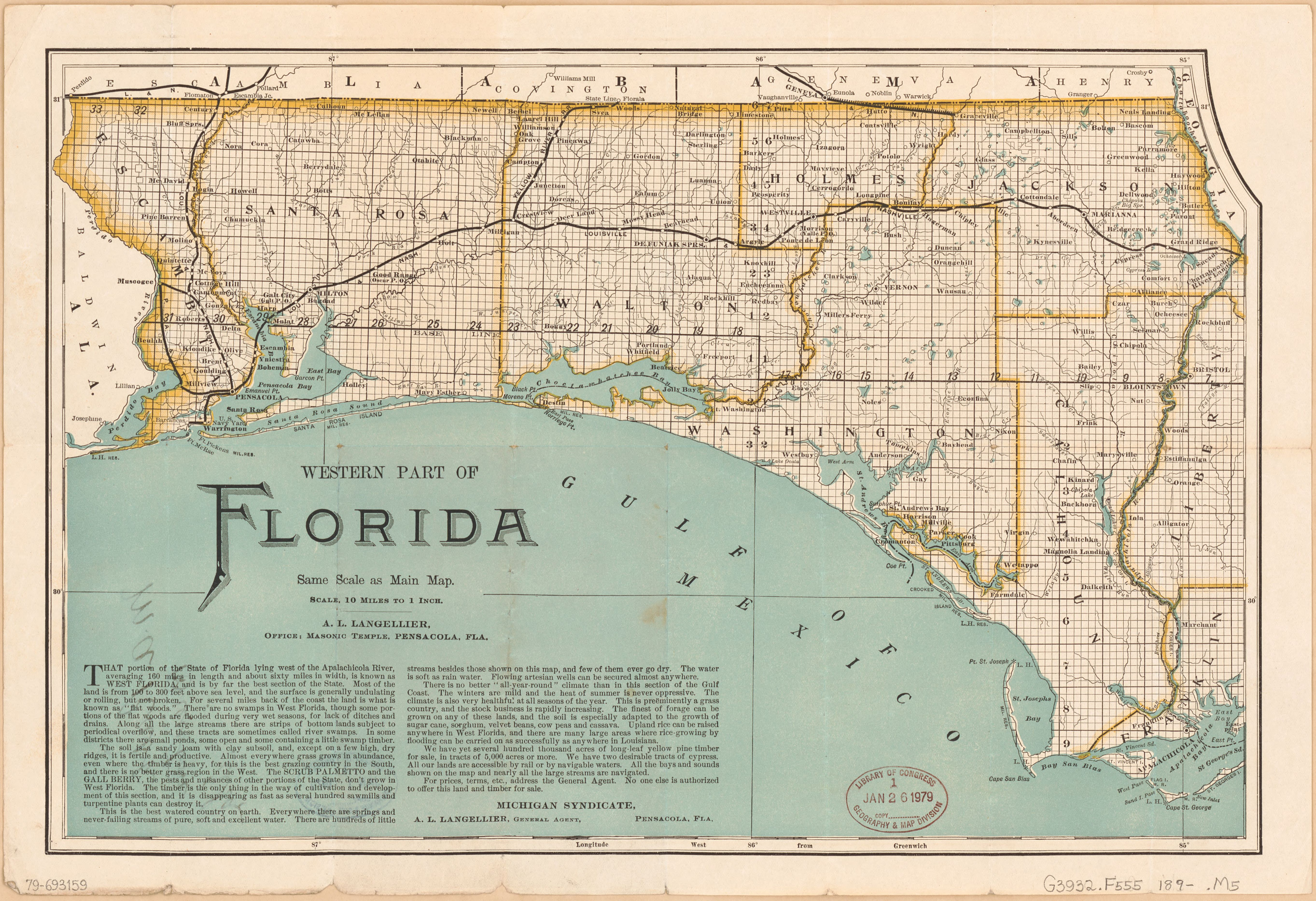
Western Florida Panhandle in 1890

Strong winds occurred across the Florida Panhandle and North Florida. According to a report by the Weather Bureau, "Every city and town between Jacksonville and Pensacola was damaged more or less. [...] This storm was the most violent one which has passed near Jacksonville during the past 23 years." Much of this portion of Florida also experienced significant losses to unpicked cotton, oranges, pecan, and sugarcane. Pensacola observed sustained winds of 68 mph (109 km/h) and gusts up to 85 mph (137 km/h), resulting in a 3-story office building being deroofed and a machine shop and opera house being partially deroofed. Winds also destroyed a church and toppled fences, trees, and outhouses. Abnormally high tides completely submerged Santa Rosa Island, threatening the island's life-saving station and quarantine facility.

Two dwellings adjacent to the Cape San Blas Lighthouse were destroyed, while the lighthouse itself sustained major damage. On Sand Island, located near St. George Island, a search discovered the wreckage of three vessels, which had been occupied by 15 crew members. The Daily News remarked that "it looked as if the men tried to save themselves upon the masts." In Apalachicola, tides pushed water up to 3 ft (0.91 m) above ground in the stores along the coast. Winds shifted several homes off their foundations and tossed several boats into the marsh. Two people died in Apalachicola. Carrabelle recorded sustained winds of 75–80 mph (121–129 km/h) and tides up to 12 ft (3.7 m) above the high water mark. All but two boats were beached and wrecked, while waves washed away shanties along the Carrabelle River. Strong winds also demolished about 15 homes. Damage in the town totaled approximately $10,000. In Lanark Village, the cyclone demolished bathhouses and the pavilion. Although Tallahassee also reported intense winds and heavy rainfall, the storm dealt little impact other than a few downed fences and trees.

Cedar Key reportedly experienced its worst storm in 25 years. Waves submerged the business district and carried away roughly 40,000 cedar logs from mill yards. Heavy impact also occurred due to winds, damaging fish houses, small dwellings, the ice factory, the railroad tracks, and city hall. The Florida Central and Peninsular Railroad also received major damage, with approximately 3.5 mi (5.6 km) of tracks leading to the mainland being destroyed or substantially damaged. Additionally, the steamer Media was destroyed, a loss of approximately $3,500. Gusty winds damaged awnings, signs, and trees in Gainesville, and blew many oranges off their trees. Similarly, the nearby community of Candler and neighboring Putnam County also sustained extensive losses to orange crops. The hurricane produced sustained winds of 49 mph (79 km/h) and gusts up to 56 mph (90 km/h) in Jacksonville. Despite being more intense than the September storm, less damage occurred in Jacksonville as a result of this hurricane. About $5,000 in damage was reported to small boats and wharves, while the cyclone ripped off tin roofs and toppled fences and trees. Damage in the city totaled about $25,000. Throughout the state of Florida, at least $100,000 in damage occurred.

In Georgia, the storm produced wind gusts up to 72 mph (116 km/h) on Tybee Island. However, the direction of the wind prevented elevated tides, while preparations mitigated any potential damage. Winds also caused little impact in Savannah, mainly limited to damage to signs, awnings, and some vegetation. Along the coastal region of Georgia, rice farmers suffered a loss of about 10% of their crops. Heavy rains fell across Georgia and South Carolina, with both states recording peak totals around 5 in (130 mm) of rain. In North Carolina, the storm generated sustained winds of 58 mph (93 km/h) at Kitty Hawk and 60 mph (97 km/h) at Hatteras, while the Weekly Star estimated that wind gusts reached 80 mph (130 km/h) at Southport. There, winds blew away the frame of the Order of Odd Fellows lodge, causing about $1,000 in damage. Strong winds also led to a disruption of telegraph service in the Wilmington area. Washouts occurred along Wilmington, Newbern and Norfolk Railroad near Folkstone and the Cape Fear and Yadkin Valley Railway between Autryville and Roseboro.

The hurricane produced rough seas along coastal Virginia and in the Chesapeake Bay. The schooners Lorena Reen, John H. Cross, and the bark Ogin capsized, while the Henry Lippet suffered major damage just south of Fort Monroe. Additionally, the steamer Louise broke free from its moorings, and while being retrieved, the ship City of Columbia accidentally crashed into it, causing about $2,000 worth of repair work. On land, sustained winds reached 60 mph (97 km/h) in Newport News, downing many fences and trees across the town. Heavy rainfall in Portsmouth left up to 1 ft (0.30 m) of water on Washington Street. In Maryland, a steam barge was beached close to Baltimore Harbor, while a large schooner went ashore at Deal Island and another at Eastport, which is now part of Annapolis. The Baltimore Sun described Hooper Strait as being "full of floating trees and debris which was blown off the shore by the gale." Winds produced by the cyclone in Delaware downed several large trees in Wilmington, but caused little damage other than the destruction of the second story of a building. High tides inundated the Harlan and Hollingsworth shipyard and a blacksmith shop.

Heavy rains in eastern Pennsylvania delayed the Ontario and Western Railway train at Jermyn, while also flooding several of the town's streets and rendering thousands of dollars in damage. In New Jersey, strong winds toppled wires and "caused several accidents" in Jersey City, according to the Paterson Daily Press, killing two horses. Stormy conditions also disrupted trolley service in the city. A pharmacy suffered significant damage to its merchandise after winds broke the storefront window in the Bergen Section, while many legal records were destroyed following the shattering of a window at a courthouse. Within the Communipaw section of Jersey City, many vessels suffered some degree of damage. One death occurred in Englewood after a chimney collapsed in on a home. Gusty winds in Hudson City shattered several windows, ripped shutters off some homes, and downed several trees, including at least four large trees, leaving some streets impassible. In the state of New York, the New York City area suffered extensively, with Long Island City alone reporting about $100,000 in damage. Winds generated by the storm toppled a seven-story building under construction onto a tenement, killing 10 people and seriously injuring 15 others.

A group which included President Grover Cleveland, private secretary Henry T. Thurber, former Massachusetts governor William E. Russell, and Elias Cornelius Benedict, encountered the storm while sailing from Naushon Island to Woods Hole. The party had difficulty docking their steam launch, known as the Coyell, at the main wharf due to rough seas, forcing them to instead land at the United States Fish Commission Station's wharf.

== See also ==
- List of Cuba hurricanes
- List of Florida hurricanes (pre-1900)
- List of New England hurricanes
- List of New Jersey hurricanes
- List of New York hurricanes
- List of North Carolina hurricanes (pre-1900)
