= Frank Hill (basketball) =

American basketball player and coach (1879–1944)

Biographical details
- Born: September 14, 1879; Paterson, New Jersey, U.S.
- Died: August 22, 1944 (aged 64); Newark, New Jersey, U.S.

Playing career
- 1904–1914: Paterson Crescents

Coaching career (HC unless noted)
- 1911–1922: St. Benedict's Prep
- 1911–1930: Seton Hall
- 1915–1943: Rutgers

Head coaching record
- Overall: 415–235 (.638) (college); 209–28 (.882) (prep school).

Francis Joseph Hill (September 14, 1879 – August 22, 1944) was an American basketball player and coach who was the head men's basketball coach at Seton Hall College (1911–1930) and Rutgers University (1915–1943).

== Playing ==
Hill was a frail child and began competing in athletics on the advice of his family physician. He excelled in the 100-yard dash and long jump and was invited to join the Institute Club. He later joined their basketball team. In 1904, he was signed by the Paterson Crescents at the suggestion of captain Nick Kearney, who called Hill "the best man I ever played against". In 1912, Hill was described by The Paterson Press as "without a doubt one of the greatest pivot men ever developed in the great indoor game of basketball". He also played for the Harrison Entre Nous team when it did not conflict with the Crescents' schedule.

== Coaching ==
Hill began his coaching career in 1911 at St. Benedict's Preparatory School. That same year, he became the head coach of the Seton Hall Pirates men's basketball team. In 1915, he began coaching at Rutgers as well. His 1919–20 Rutgers team made it to the finals of the AAU men's basketball tournament, but lost to NYU. He gave up coaching at St. Benedict's in 1922 and Seton Hall in 1930, but continued to coach the Rutgers Scarlet Knights men's basketball team until 1943, when the program was suspended due to World War II. Hill's overall record at the college level is 415–235.

== Personal life ==
Hill and his wife, the former Rose R. Welsh, had two sons and two daughters. One son, Maurice, played for Hill's final Rutgers basketball team and coached at Lakewood High School. His grandson, Chris Hill also played basketball at Rutgers and was the athletic director at the University of Utah. His grandniece is the wife of former National Basketball Association coach Richie Adubato. Outside of basketball, Hill worked for the Newark Water Department.

Hill died on August 22, 1944 at his home in Newark.
