= Chris Hill (athletic director) =

American college athletics administrator and former basketball player and coach

Biographical details
- Born: c. 1950 (age 75–76)

Playing career
- 1969–1972: Rutgers

Coaching career (HC unless noted)
- 1973–1974: Utah (GA)
- 1975–1979: Granger HS
- 1979–1981: Utah (assistant)

Administrative career (AD unless noted)
- 1985–1986: Crimson Club (director)
- 1987–2018: Utah

Accomplishments and honors

Awards
- Mountain West Conference's Commissioner's Award (2004); Utah High School 4A Coach of the Year (1975)

Chris Hill (born c. 1950) is an American college athletics administrator and former basketball player and coach. He was the athletic director at the University of Utah from 1987 to 2018. His responsibilities included overseeing the athletic department and supervising all the coaches. During his thirty-one years in his position, he has hired several coaches, secured funding for facilities upgrades, and negotiated the University of Utah's entrance into the Pac-12 Conference.

== Background ==
Hill is the son of Rutgers Scarlet Knights men's basketball player Mo Hill and the grandson of Rutgers and Seton Hall coach Frank Hill. He was co-captain of the 1971–72 Rutgers team.

== Coaches hired ==
During Hill's tenure, the Utah Utes have shown success in several different sports. He has been responsible for hiring Rick Majerus in college basketball and Ron McBride, Urban Meyer, and Kyle Whittingham in college football. From 2004–2009, he served on the NCAA Division I Men's Basketball Committee, which decides which teams are accepted into the NCAA Men's Division I Basketball Championship tournament held each March.

A March 2013 story appearing Yahoo! Sports suggested that Hill ignored complaints from students and parents about abusive behavior from Greg Winslow, a swimming coach at Utah from 2007 to 2013.

== Facilities improvements ==
Hill has helped improve the athletics facilities at Utah. In 1998, the school remodeled Rice-Eccles Stadium in preparation for the 2002 Winter Olympics, which held the opening and closing ceremonies at the stadium. In addition, the following facilities have been improved or built during his tenure: the George S. Eccles Tennis Center, Dee Glen Smith Athletics Center, and the McCarthey Practice Fields.

== Pac-12 Conference ==
Hill and University of Utah president Michael K. Young negotiated with the Pacific-10 Conference (Pac-10) to make Utah a member. Utah joined the Pac-10 for the 2011–12 academic year. The University of Colorado at Boulder also joined the Pac-10 in 2011, when the conference was renamed as the Pac-12 Conference (Pac-12).
