= 1894 Atlantic hurricane season =

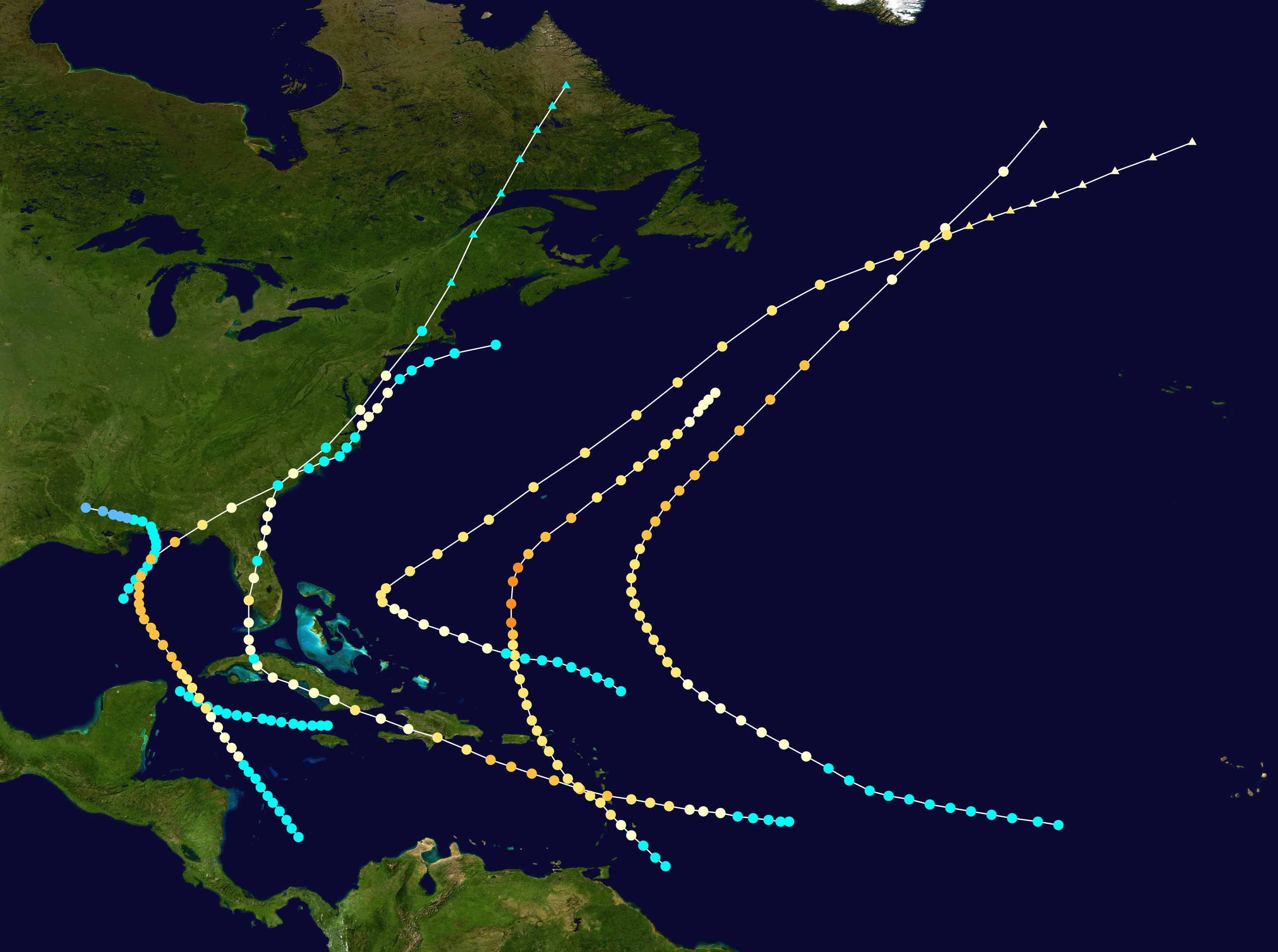
- Season summary map

Seasonal boundaries
- First system formed: June 6, 1894
- Last system dissipated: October 29, 1894

Strongest storm
- Name: Six
  - Maximum winds: 130 mph (215 km/h) (1-minute sustained)
  - Lowest pressure: 931 mbar (hPa; 27.49 inHg)

Seasonal statistics
- Total storms: 7
- Hurricanes: 5
- Major hurricanes (Cat. 3+): 4
- Total fatalities: >269
- Total damage: At least $5.29 million (1894 USD)

Related article
- 1890s North Indian Ocean cyclone seasons

The 1894 Atlantic hurricane season included four major hurricanes, (Note: A major hurricane is a storm that ranks as Category 3 or higher on the Saffir–Simpson hurricane wind scale.) one of the highest totals in the second half of the 19th century and behind only the previous year. Additionally, the season featured a total of seven tropical storms, five of which strengthened into a hurricane. However, in the absence of modern satellite and other remote-sensing technologies, only storms that affected populated land areas or encountered ships at sea were recorded, so the actual total could be higher. An undercount bias of zero to six tropical cyclones per year between 1851 and 1885 and zero to four per year between 1886 and 1910 has been estimated.

Meteorologists José Fernández-Partagás and Henry F. Diaz added one new storm, the first cyclone, to the Atlantic hurricane database (HURDAT) as part of their 1996 reanalysis. Later, the Atlantic hurricane reanalysis project upgraded the fourth system to major hurricane status but did not increase or decrease the overall number of cyclones. A study by climate researcher Michael Chenoweth, published in 2014, concluded that eight cyclones formed in the Atlantic in 1894, recommending the removal of the cyclone first documented by Fernández-Partagás and Diaz and the addition of two new systems. However, the proposals suggested in Chenoweth's study have yet to be included in HURDAT.

The first storm of the season existed over the northwestern Caribbean Sea by June 6. Passing between Cuba and Jamaica, the cyclone dropped heavy rain in the former before dissipating three days later. One person drowned after being swept overboard due to rough seas generated by the third system. In the second half of September, the fourth storm of the season caused at least 227 deaths and more than $5.09 million (1894 USD) in damage across the Lesser Antilles, Greater Antilles, and the East Coast of the United States. (Note: All damage figures are in 1894 USD, unless otherwise noted) The following system primarily impacted the Eastern United States in early October, inflicting more than $200,000 in damage and at least 28 fatalities. That same month, the season's most intense cyclone, the sixth system, which peaked as a Category 4 hurricane on the present-day Saffir–Simpson scale, killed at least 13 people in the Lesser Antilles. By October 29, the seventh and final storm transitioned into an extratropical cyclone well east of Atlantic Canada. Collectively, the cyclones of the 1894 season caused more than $5.29 million in damage and more than 269 deaths.

== Season summary ==
The Atlantic hurricane database (HURDAT) officially recognizes that seven tropical cyclones formed during the 1894 season, five of which strengthened into a hurricane. Four of those intensified into a major hurricane, one of the most recorded during a season in the second half of the nineteenth century, tied with 1886 and behind only the previous season, which had five. Meteorologists José Fernández-Partagás and Henry F. Diaz added a new storm, the first system, during their reanalysis of the season in 1996. Although the Atlantic hurricane reanalysis project did not add or remove any storms, it upgraded the fourth cyclone to major hurricane status in accordance with a 2003 study led by meteorologist Emery R. Boose. However, a more recent reanalysis by climate researcher Michael Chenoweth, published in 2014, adds two storms and removes one – the first system – for a net gain of one cyclone; Chenoweth's study utilizes a more extensive collection of newspapers and ship logs, as well as late 19th century weather maps for the first time, in comparison to previous reanalysis projects. The proposals by Chenoweth have yet to be incorporated into HURDAT, however.

The first storm of the season existed over the northwestern Caribbean Sea by June 6. After passing between Cuba and Jamaica, the cyclone continued generally westward until dissipating three days later. No tropical cyclogenesis has been confirmed to have occurred again for nearly two months, with a tropical storm appearing over the central Gulf of Mexico by August 5. One other system existed that month, being first observed on August 30 west of the Cabo Verde Islands. Only one cyclone is known to have formed in September. October was the most active month, featuring three systems, all of which became hurricanes. Additionally, the sixth cyclone became the season's most intense, peaking on October 16 as a Category 4 hurricane on the present-day Saffir–Simpson scale with maximum sustained winds of 130 mph (215 km/h) and a minimum atmospheric pressure of 931 mbar (27.5 inHg). By October 29, the seventh and final storm transitioned into an extratropical cyclone well east of Atlantic Canada. Collectively, the cyclones of the 1894 season caused more than $5.29 million in damage and over 269 deaths.

The season's activity was reflected with an accumulated cyclone energy (ACE) rating of 135, the fourth highest total of the decade. ACE is a metric used to express the energy used by a tropical cyclone during its lifetime. Therefore, a storm with a longer duration will have higher values of ACE. It is only calculated at six-hour increments in which specific tropical and subtropical systems are either at or above sustained wind speeds of 39 mph (63 km/h), which is the threshold for tropical storm intensity. Thus, tropical depressions are not included here.

== Systems ==
=== Tropical Storm One ===
- Tropical storm (SSHWS)
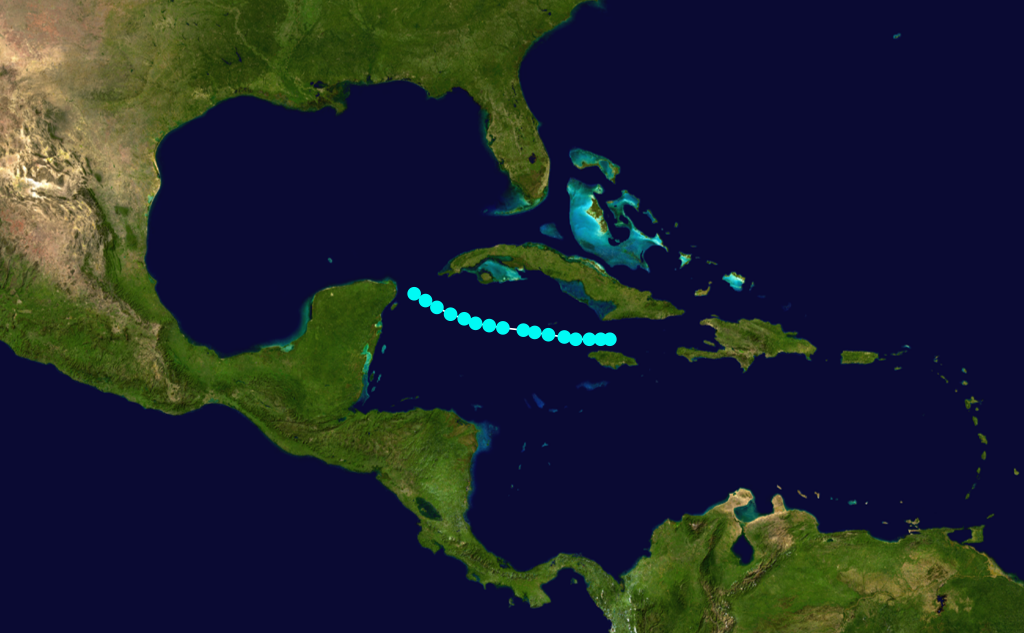
- Duration: June 6 – June 9
- Peak intensity: 40 mph (65 km/h) (1-min);

According to reanalysis by José Fernández-Partagás and Henry F. Diaz in 1996, this system may have formed as early as June 4. However, Fernández-Partagás and Diaz elected to retain Simón Sarasola's 1928 narrative on this cyclone, indicating development about halfway between Cuba and Jamaica early on June 6. The cyclone remained weak, peaking with maximum sustained winds of 40 mph (65 km/h) as it headed generally west-northwestward. Late on June 9, the storm was last noted near northeastern tip of the Yucatán Peninsula. Flooding occurred in Cuba between Havana and Oriente Province, with the worst impacts in Santa Clara. Climate researcher Michael Chenoweth proposed the exclusion of this storm from HURDAT, arguing that ship records instead were more likely related to a tropical wave and strong high-pressure system.

=== Tropical Storm Two ===
- Tropical storm (SSHWS)
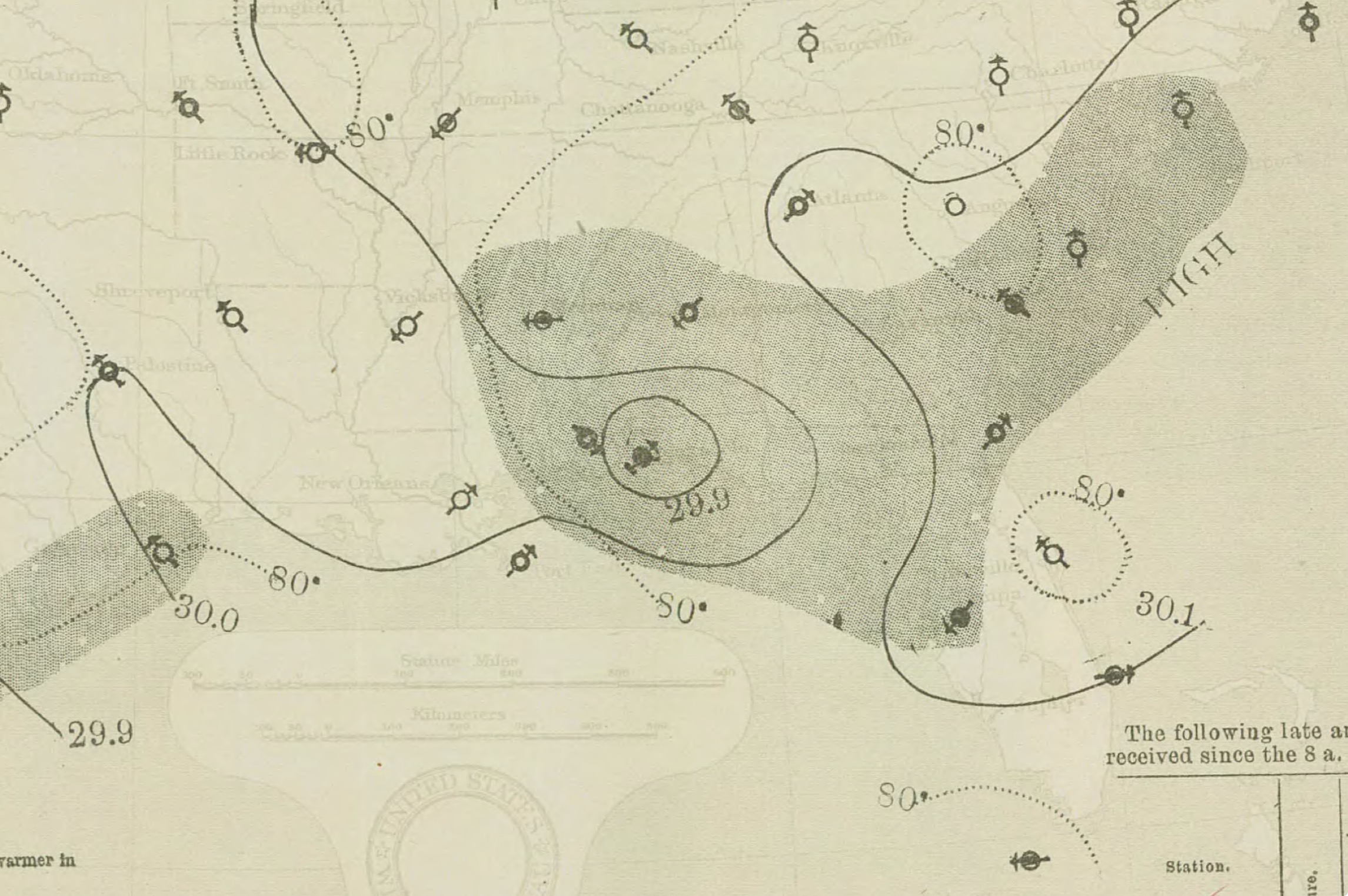
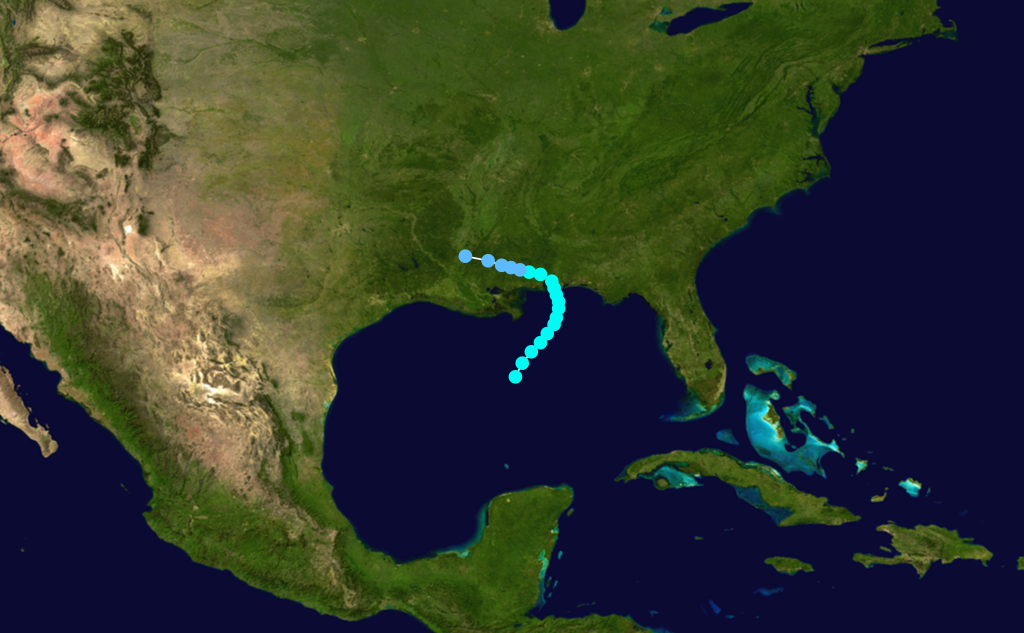
- Duration: August 5 – August 9
- Peak intensity: 60 mph (95 km/h) (1-min);

Observations from the eastern Gulf of Mexico during the early hours of August 4 "indicated the presence of a cyclonic whirl", as noted by the Monthly Weather Review. However, due to conflicting reports, the official track for this storm begins in the central Gulf of Mexico at 06:00 UTC on August 5. The cyclone moved northeastward and strengthened to reach sustained winds of 60 mph (95 km/h) about 24 hours later. By August 7, the system curved north-northwestward and made landfall near Orange Beach, Alabama, at the same intensity around 18:00 UTC. It turned to the west-northwest after moving inland, and dissipated late on August 9 over Louisiana.

Chenoweth extends the track back to August 3, with the storm forming over the northwestern Caribbean instead. The storm strikes the Yucatán Peninsula and then moves northward over the Gulf of Mexico, eventually following a similar path to that listed in HURDAT. In the Gulf of Mexico, the schooner Violin was dismasted during the storm and towed to shore by another schooner, the Henry Southers. Additionally, the ship Catherine wrecked at the reef of Santa Rosa Island and the crew required rescuing. The storm produced sustained winds up to 52 mph (84 km/h) at Pensacola, Florida, while heavy rains fell in areas along the Gulf Coast. Precipitation generated by the storm flooded several homes in Pensacola and winds downed a number of fences and trees.

=== Hurricane Three ===
- Category 3 hurricane (SSHWS)
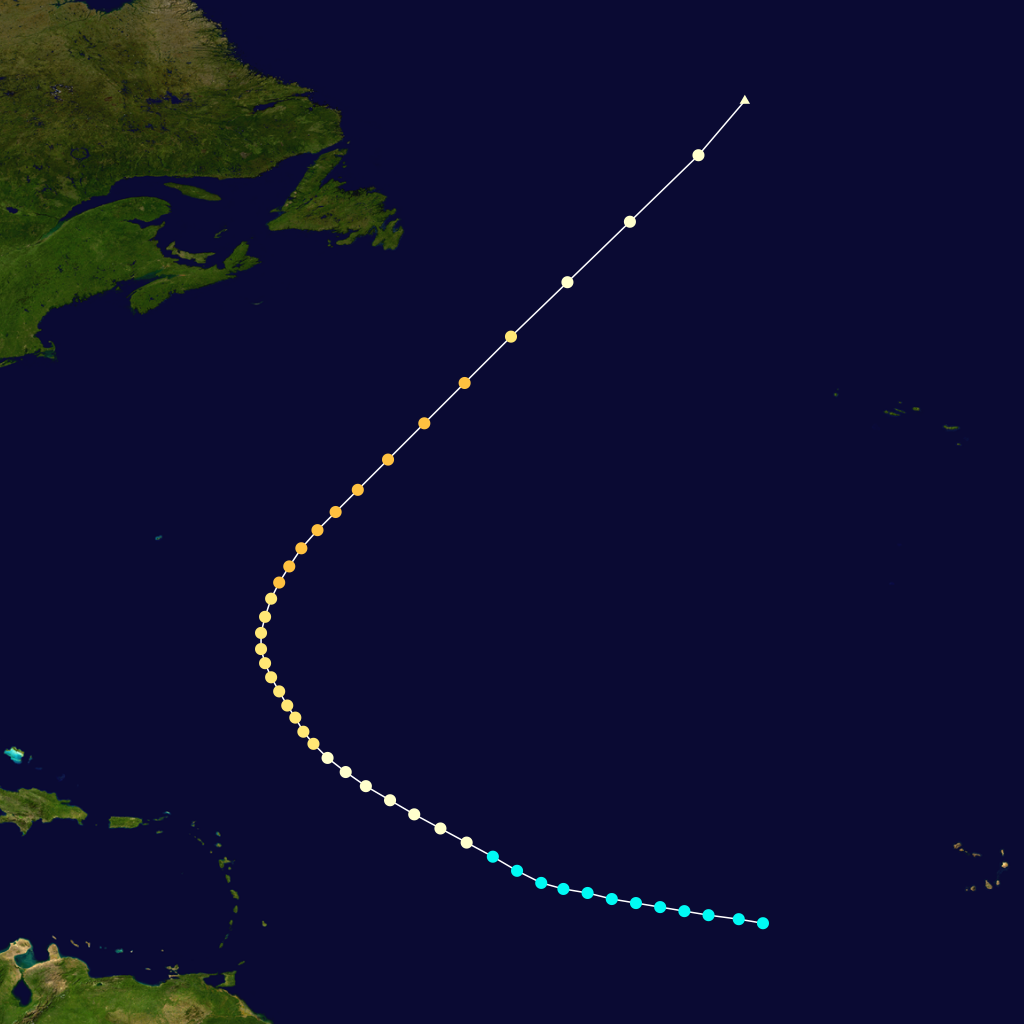
- Duration: August 30 – September 9
- Peak intensity: 115 mph (185 km/h) (1-min); 948 mbar (hPa)

A tropical storm was first observed on August 30 near 14°N 38°W, which is approximately 700 mi (1,125 km) west-southwest of Cape Verde. The system slowly intensified while moving generally west-northwestward and then northwestward by September 1. Early on the following day, the storm strengthened into a hurricane. Around 18:00 UTC on September 3, the cyclone intensified into a Category 2 hurricane on the modern-day Saffir–Simpson scale and soon turned north-northwestward. The hurricane re-curved again by early on September 6 and reached Category 3 hurricane intensity later that day, peaking with winds of 115 mph (185 km/h). Several steamships encountered the hurricane on September 8 and September 9, including the Othello, which observed a barometric pressure of 948 mbar (28.0 inHg), the lowest known pressure in relation to the storm. Additionally, the schooner Origin became caught in the storm, which damaged several parts of the ship and threw one person overboard, who drowned. The hurricane weakened and lost tropical characteristics as it accelerated northeastward, transitioning into an extratropical cyclone about 500 mi (805 km) southeast of Greenland late on September 9.

In his 2014 study, Chenoweth proposed a mostly similar path to that listed in HURDAT, other than slightly farther west and east at certain points. The study also adds a tropical depression stage on August 30 and August 31.

=== Hurricane Four ===
- Category 3 hurricane (SSHWS)
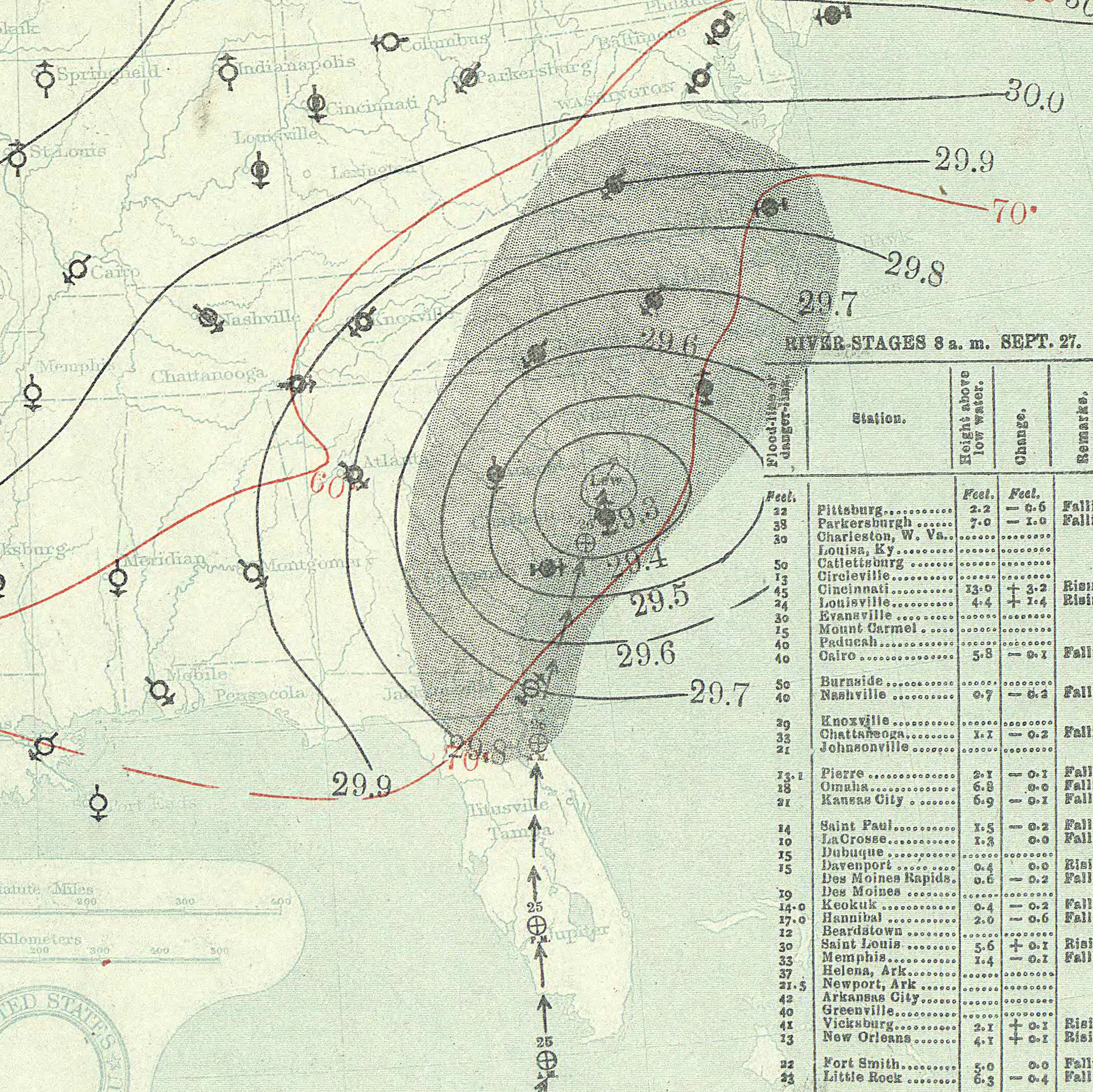
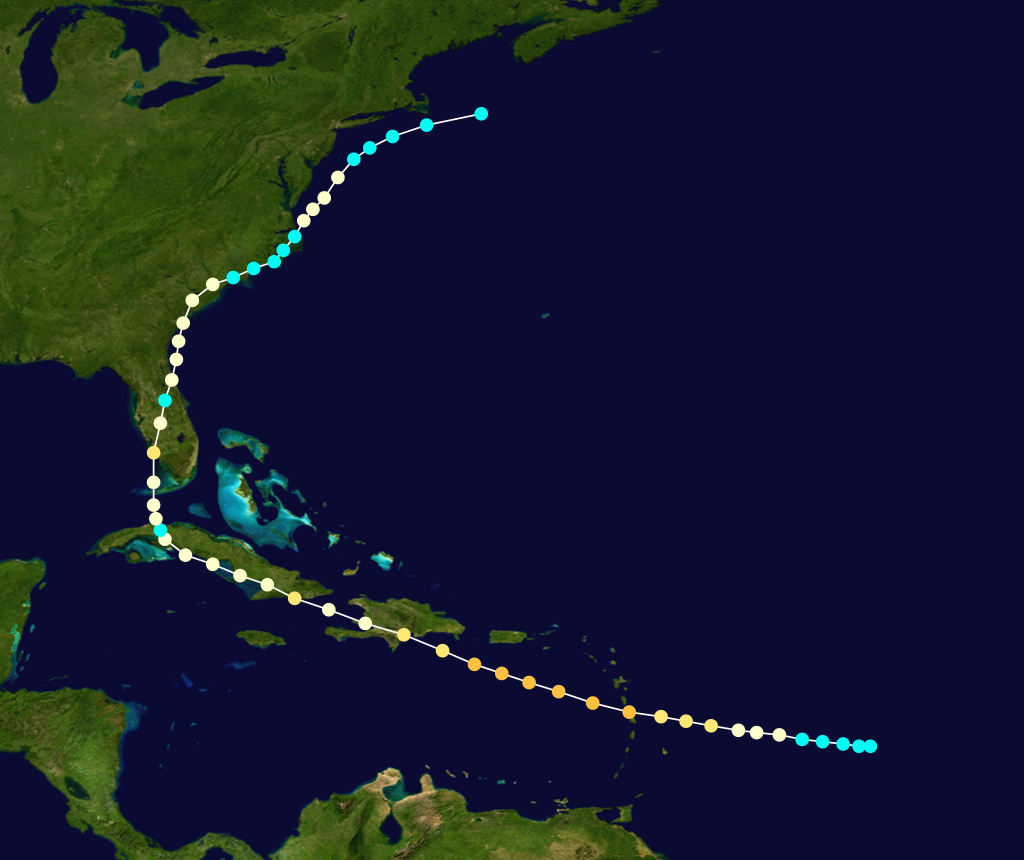
- Duration: September 18 – October 1
- Peak intensity: 120 mph (195 km/h) (1-min); 975 mbar (hPa)

This system was first observed well east of the Lesser Antilles on September 18. Gradually intensifying as it headed west-northwestward, the cyclone became a hurricane on September 19 and a major hurricane on the next day while passing near Martinique. After entering the Caribbean, the storm peaked with winds of 120 mph (195 km/h) on September 21, but weakened to a Category 2 hurricane before striking the Dominican Republic on September 22. The system weakened to a Category 1 hurricane before reaching the Gulf of Gonâve, but briefly became a Category 2 hurricane again before striking Cuba near Santiago de Cuba on September 23. Moving west-northwestward along or near the south coast of Cuba, the hurricane turned northward over Matanzas Province on September 24 and briefly weakened to a tropical storm.

The cyclone re-intensified into a hurricane over the Straits of Florida on September 25. It then struck Key West, Florida, and later near Punta Rassa, the latter at its secondary peak of 105 mph (165 km/h). After turning north-northeastward and weakening to a tropical storm, the system re-attained hurricane status shortly before entering the Atlantic on September 26. The hurricane struck near Port Royal, South Carolina, early on September 27. Thereafter, the cyclone curved east-northeastward and weakened to a tropical storm over southeastern North Carolina early on September 28. Briefly re-emerging into the Atlantic, the cyclone made its final landfall near Atlantic Beach. After again emerging into the Atlantic, the storm became a hurricane on September 29. However, the cyclone weakened back to a tropical storm on September 30 and was last noted on October 1 east of New England. Chenoweth's study made little adjustments to the track of this storm, although it became extratropical on September 30. Additionally, Chenoweth proposed that the cyclone became a major hurricane as it approached and then struck Florida.

Squalls and rough seas in the Lesser Antilles capsized many vessels, causing 10 fatalities on Saint Kitts and another three on Antigua. The hurricane also damaged agriculture, communications, trees, and roads in the region. Numerous structures on Hispaniola suffered some degree of damage, with 500 homes and two churches destroyed. In Cuba, flooding occurred across much of the island, especially in Sagua La Grande after the Sagua la Grande River overflowed, with floodwaters reaching 8 ft (2.4 m) above ground in a hotel. The storm destroyed roughly 70 homes and substantially damaged 200 others, rendering about 3,000 families homeless. Approximately 200 people died in Cuba as a result of the storm, while damage in the country totaled about $4 million. Rough seas capsized or destroyed several vessels offshore Florida, causing 14 deaths. Winds damaged a number of structures in the state, especially in Jacksonville and Tampa, while storm surge and abnormally high tides entered several buildings in St. Augustine. Damage throughout Florida totaled about $1 million. Adverse conditions produced by the storm caused some impacts farther north, including approximately $18,000 in damage when the schooner Benjamin F. Lee wrecked at Cape Romain, South Carolina, and more than $75,000 in damage in New York.

=== Hurricane Five ===
- Category 3 hurricane (SSHWS)
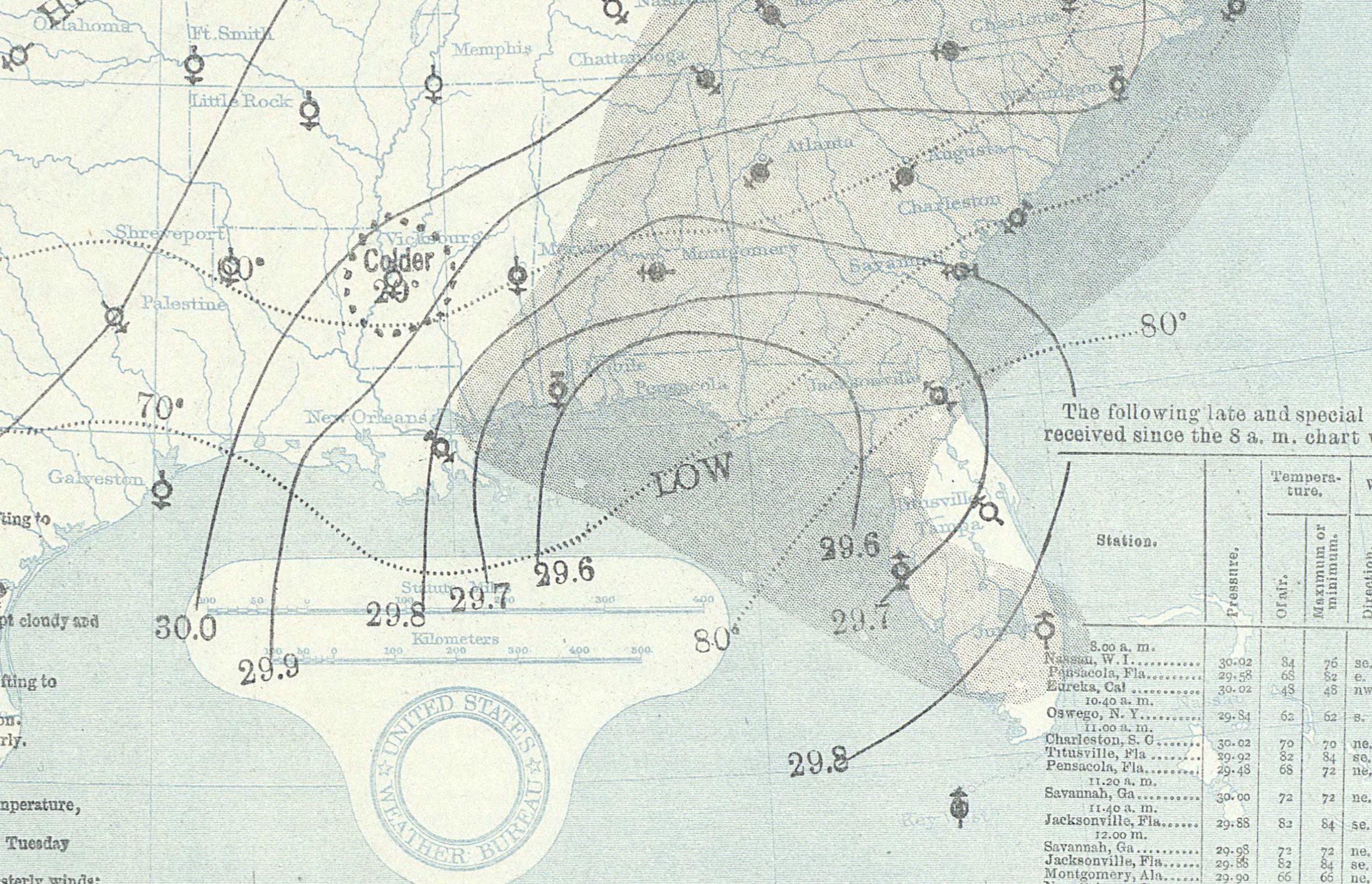
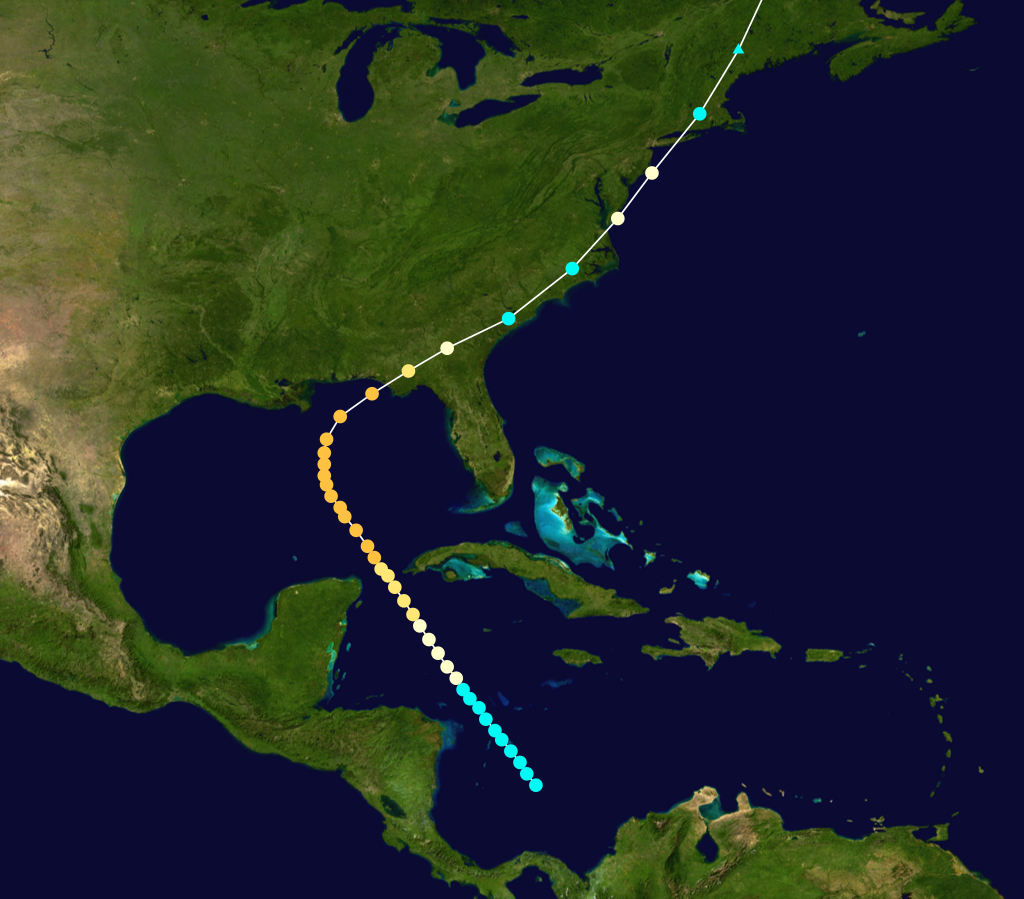
- Duration: October 1 – October 10
- Peak intensity: 120 mph (195 km/h) (1-min); 955 mbar (hPa)

Due to falling atmospheric pressures in the southwestern Caribbean and surrounding land seas, the official track for this cyclone begins on October 1. A minimal tropical storm, the system moved northwestward and intensified into a hurricane on October 3 while passing northeast of Honduras. Late on the October 5, the cyclone passed about 45 mi (70 km) west of Cabo San Antonio, Cuba, as it entered the Gulf of Mexico. The hurricane then strengthened, peaking with winds of 120 mph (195 km/h) on October 6. Around midday on October 7, the cyclone turned northward, before curving northeastward late on October 8. Around 03:00 UTC the next day, the system struck near Panama City, Florida; a 2003 reanalysis estimated a barometric pressure of 955 mbar (28.2 inHg) at landfall. The hurricane weakened quickly as it moved inland, deteriorating to a tropical storm over South Carolina on October 9. However, the storm emerged into the Atlantic early on the following day and soon re-strengthened into a hurricane. At 15:00 UTC on October 10, the system made landfall near Bellport, New York, with winds of 85 mph (140 km/h), shortly before striking Connecticut and weakening to a tropical storm. Becoming extratropical over Maine late on October 10, the storm's remnants continued northeastward into Atlantic Canada before dissipating over Labrador on October 12.

In the 2014 study by Chenoweth, he proposed a very similar track shown in HURDAT. However, the storm instead formed near the coast of Colombia on September 26 and initially moved very slowly northwestward. The hurricane dropped heavy rains over western Cuba, flooding towns such as Guara, Pinar del Río, San Cristóbal. Storm surge impacted Louisiana and Mississippi, submerging land south of Pointe à la Hache in the former, while washing away a 1,000 ft (300 m) section of railroad and wrecking vessels on Horn Island in the latter. Winds caused some damage, especially in Mississippi City, Mississippi, where several outbuildings and a church were destroyed. In Florida, extensive impact occurred, with the Weather Bureau noting that "Every city and town between Jacksonville and Pensacola was damaged more or less. [...] This storm was the most violent one which has passed near Jacksonville during the past 23 years." Unpicked cotton, oranges, pecan, and sugarcane also suffered extensive losses across this section of the state. Seventeen people died in Florida, including two at Apalachicola and fifteen at Sand Island, near St. George Island, where three vessels were wrecked. At least $100,000 in damage occurred in Florida. The storm impacted much of the rest of the East Coast of the United States, especially New Jersey and New York. In the former, one person died in Englewood after a chimney fell inside a home. The New York City area suffered extensively, with Long Island City alone reporting about $100,000 in damage. Winds generated by the storm toppled a seven-story building under construction onto a tenement, killing 10 people and seriously injuring 15 others.

=== Hurricane Six ===
- Category 4 hurricane (SSHWS)
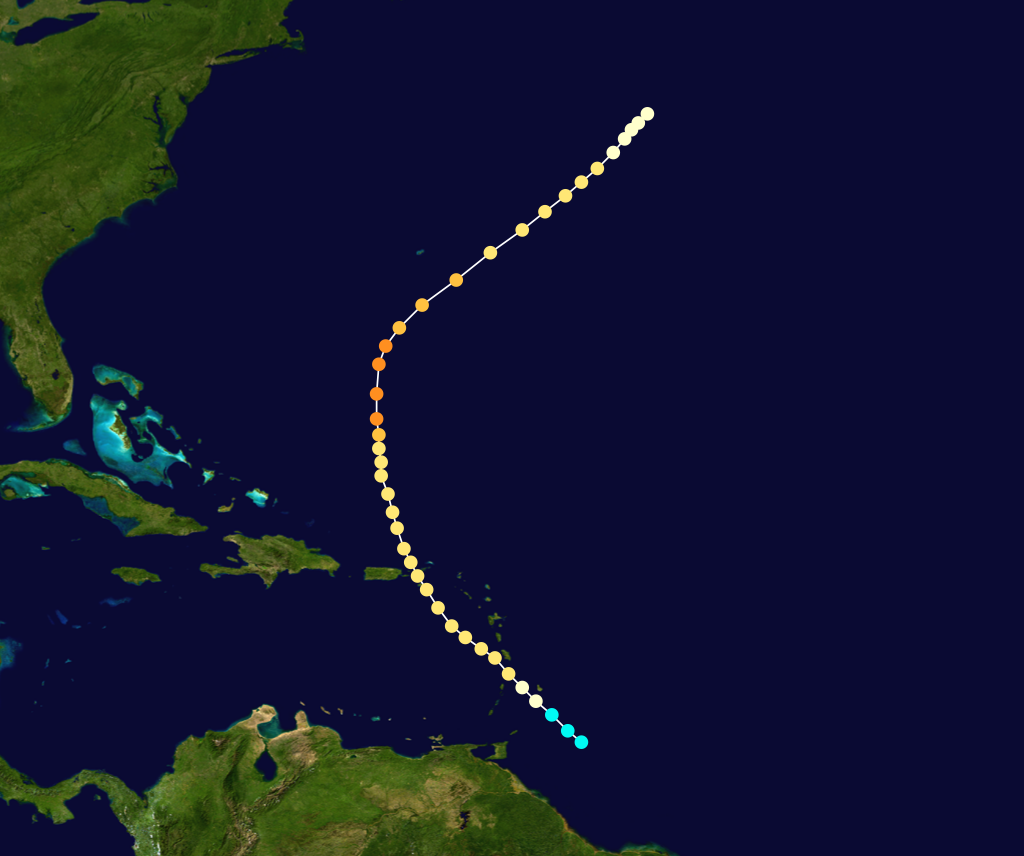
- Duration: October 11 – October 20
- Peak intensity: 130 mph (215 km/h) (1-min); 931 mbar (hPa)

Although atmospheric pressures began to fall near Trinidad on October 10, the presence of a cyclone could not be confirmed until the following day. Located approximately 215 mi (345 km) east of Trinidad, the tropical storm moved northwestward and strengthened into a hurricane late on October 11. During the following day, the storm passed near Barbados and then struck Saint Lucia at Category 2 intensity. The hurricane crossed through the western Virgin Islands early on October 14 before re-emerging into the Atlantic. Curving northward, the cyclone intensified significantly on October 16, with the ship Herschel observing a barometric pressure of 931 mbar (27.5 inHg). Consequently, the storm is estimated to have peaked as a Category 4 hurricane with winds of 130 mph (215 km/h). On October 17, the system began weakening and turning to the northeast, passing southeast of Bermuda. The storm was last noted on October 20, with the track ending approximately 460 mi (740 km) southeast of Sable Island.

Chenoweth proposed few significant changes from HURDAT, aside from a 12-hour tropical depression stage on October 11. Additionally, his study indicates that the cyclone weakened to a tropical storm on October 13, but re-intensified into a hurricane late on October 15. The hurricane severely damaged or destroyed 360 homes on Barbados, while several vessels went missing. As a result, one person died due to exposure and seventeen people remained unaccounted for one week after the storm. On St. Lucia, the Vieux Fort District reported extensive damage to property, including the destruction of a church and many factories. Cocoa and sugar crops were reportedly completely lost due to the fields being flooded, while landslides blocked numerous roads. Twelve deaths occurred on Saint Lucia, nine due to ships capsizing at Dennery and three others because of a landslide burying a home near Malgretoute. The storm produced sustained winds up to 40 mph (65 km/h) and barometric pressures as low as 997 mbar (29.4 inHg) on Bermuda, as well as rough seas.

=== Hurricane Seven ===
- Category 2 hurricane (SSHWS)
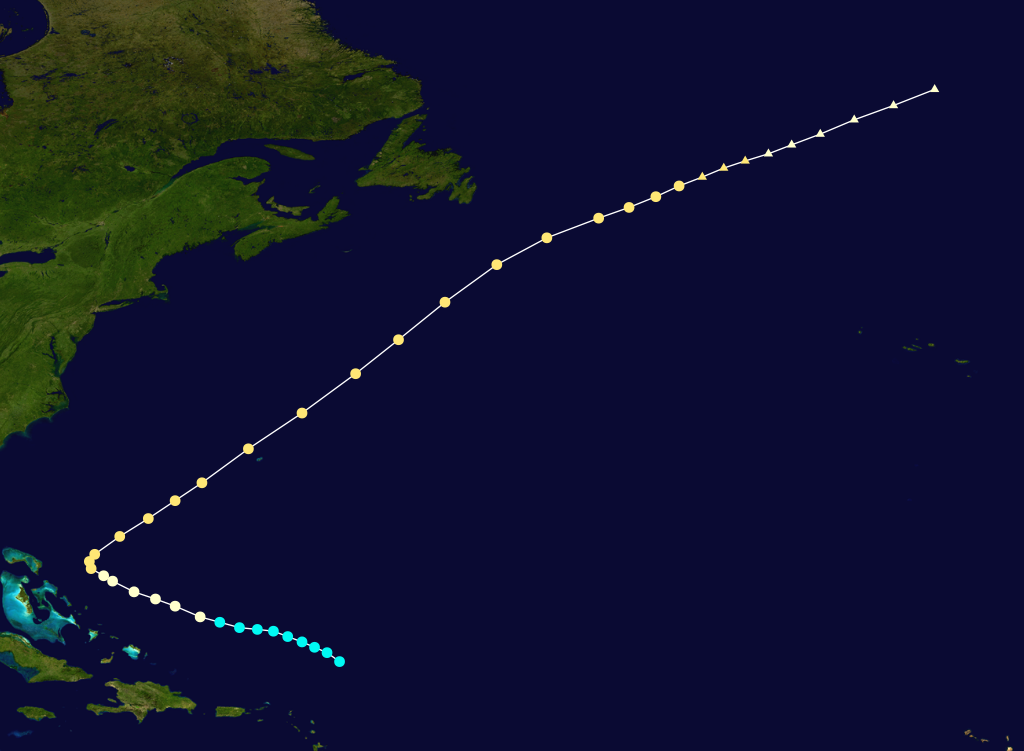
- Duration: October 21 – October 29
- Peak intensity: 110 mph (175 km/h) (1-min); 955 mbar (hPa)

Based on observations and reanalysis by Fernández-Partagás and Diaz, the track for this storm commenced about 265 mi (425 km) northeast of the Lesser Antilles on October 21. Moving generally west-northwestward, the tropical storm is estimated to have intensified into a hurricane two days later. After briefly stalling east of the Bahamas on October 25, the hurricane turned northeastward. The system then moved about 50 mi (80 km) northwest of Bermuda late the following day as a Category 2 hurricane. Slightly further strengthening occurred as the storm passed southeast and then east of Atlantic Canada. Early on October 29, the hurricane peaked with winds of 110 mph (175 km/h) and a minimum pressure of 955 mbar (28.2 inHg), based on observations from the ship Maryland. Several hours later, however, the storm transitioned into an extratropical cyclone, which continued northeastward until dissipating west of Ireland on October 31.

Chenoweth's study proposed few changes to this cyclone. Slight adjustments were proposed to the track and to the timing of intensification into a hurricane and extratropical transition, the latter of which occurred late on October 28. The storm produced winds as far west as the east coast of Florida, while Nassau, Bahamas, observed a barometric pressure slightly less than 1006 mbar (29.7 inHg). On Bermuda, sustained winds briefly reached 81 mph (130 km/h), toppling telephone poles and large, old trees. Recently planted crops sustained significant damage. Additionally, abnormally high tides generated by the cyclone left at least one road nearly impassible.

=== Other storms ===
Chenoweth proposed two storms not currently listed in HURDAT. The first of the two developed on September 9 over the Gulf of Honduras. Moving northwestward, the system struck central British Honduras (present-day Belize) as a tropical storm before dissipating the next day over Guatemala. Later, Chenoweth's other proposed cyclone formed over the open Atlantic about 650 mi (1,045 km) northeast of the Lesser Antilles on November 30. The storm reached hurricane status as it tracked generally east-northeastward and later northeastward. Early on December 8, the system crossed the far eastern Azores shortly before transitioning into an extratropical cyclone. In the Azores, the storm partially demolished the breakwater in Ponta Delgada and substantially damaged a floating dock. A few vessels also suffered some degree of damage, with the loss of a brig.

== Season effects ==
This is a table of all of the known storms that have formed in the 1894 Atlantic hurricane season. It includes their duration, landfall, damages, and death totals. Deaths in parentheses are additional and indirect (an example of an indirect death would be a traffic accident), but were still related to that storm. Damage and deaths include totals while the storm was extratropical, a wave, or a low, and all of the damage figures are in 1894 USD.

Saffir–Simpson scale
TD	TS	C1	C2	C3	C4	C5

1894 North Atlantic tropical cyclone season statistics
Storm name	Dates active	Storm category at peak intensity	Max 1-min wind mph (km/h)	Min. press. (mbar)	Areas affected	Damage (US$)	Deaths	Ref(s).
One	June 6–9	Tropical storm	40 (65)	Unknown	Jamaica, Cuba, Mexico	Unknown	None	
Two	August 5–9	Tropical storm	60 (95)	Unknown	Gulf Coast of the United States (Alabama)	Unknown	None	
Three	August 30 – September 9	Category 3 hurricane	115 (185)	948	None	Unknown	1	
Four	September 18 – October 1	Category 3 hurricane	120 (195)	975	Lesser Antilles, Greater Antilles (Dominican Republic and Cuba), East Coast of the United States (Florida)	$5.09 million	227	
Five	October 1–10	Category 3 hurricane	120 (195)	955	Cuba, Gulf Coast of the United States (Florida)	>$200,000	28	
Six	October 11–20	Category 4 hurricane	130 (215)	931	Lesser Antilles (Saint Lucia), Bermuda	Unknown	13	
Seven	October 21–29	Category 2 hurricane	110 (175)	955	Bahamas, Florida, Bermuda	Unknown	None	
Season aggregates
7 systems	June 12 – October 29		130 (215)	948		>$5.29 million	269	

== See also ==
- Atlantic hurricane reanalysis project
- Tropical cyclone observation
