= Davis Reef =

Coral reef in the Florida Keys, US

- Location within Florida Location within the Caribbean

Location
- Location: Caribbean
- Coordinates: 24°55′19″N 080°30′15″W
- Country: United States

Geology
- Type: reef

Davis Reef is a coral reef located within the Florida Keys National Marine Sanctuary. It lies to the southeast of Plantation Key. This reef lies within a Sanctuary Preservation Area (SPA).

The southern end of the reef is sometimes called "Davis Ledge."

Davis reef lies between Crocker Reef and Conch Reef.

The Fish and Wildlife Research Institute (FWRI, the research arm of the Florida Fish and Wildlife Conservation Commission), the Florida Keys National Marine Sanctuary, the Coral Restoration Foundation (CRF), the Wildlife Foundation of Florida (WFF), and the family of Charlie Stroh have recently begun a program of "outplanting" corals around Davis reef.

== Gallery ==
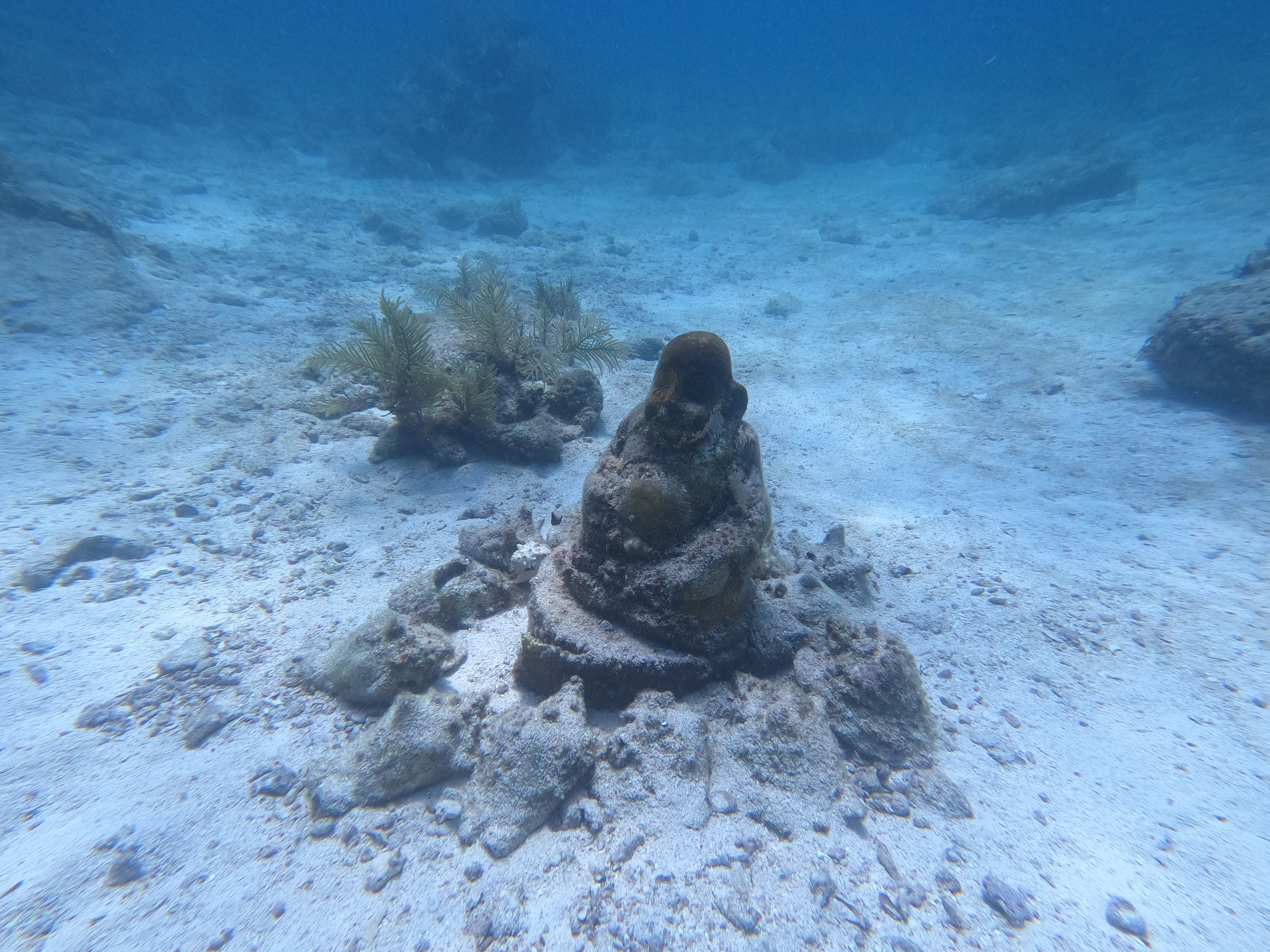
Budha statue at Davis Reef, 2023

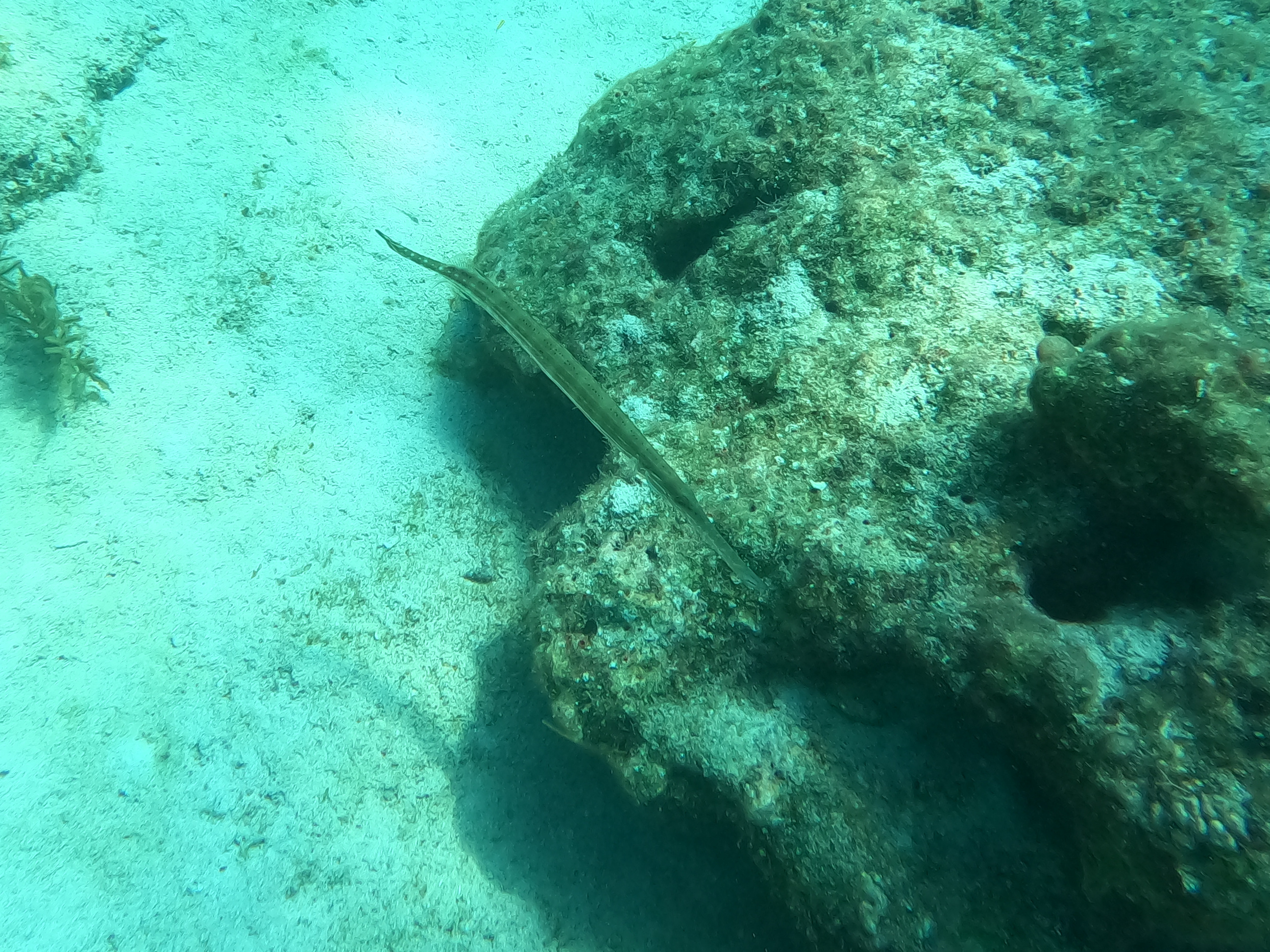
Trumpetfish (Aulostomus maculatus)
