= 1894 Greater Antilles hurricane =

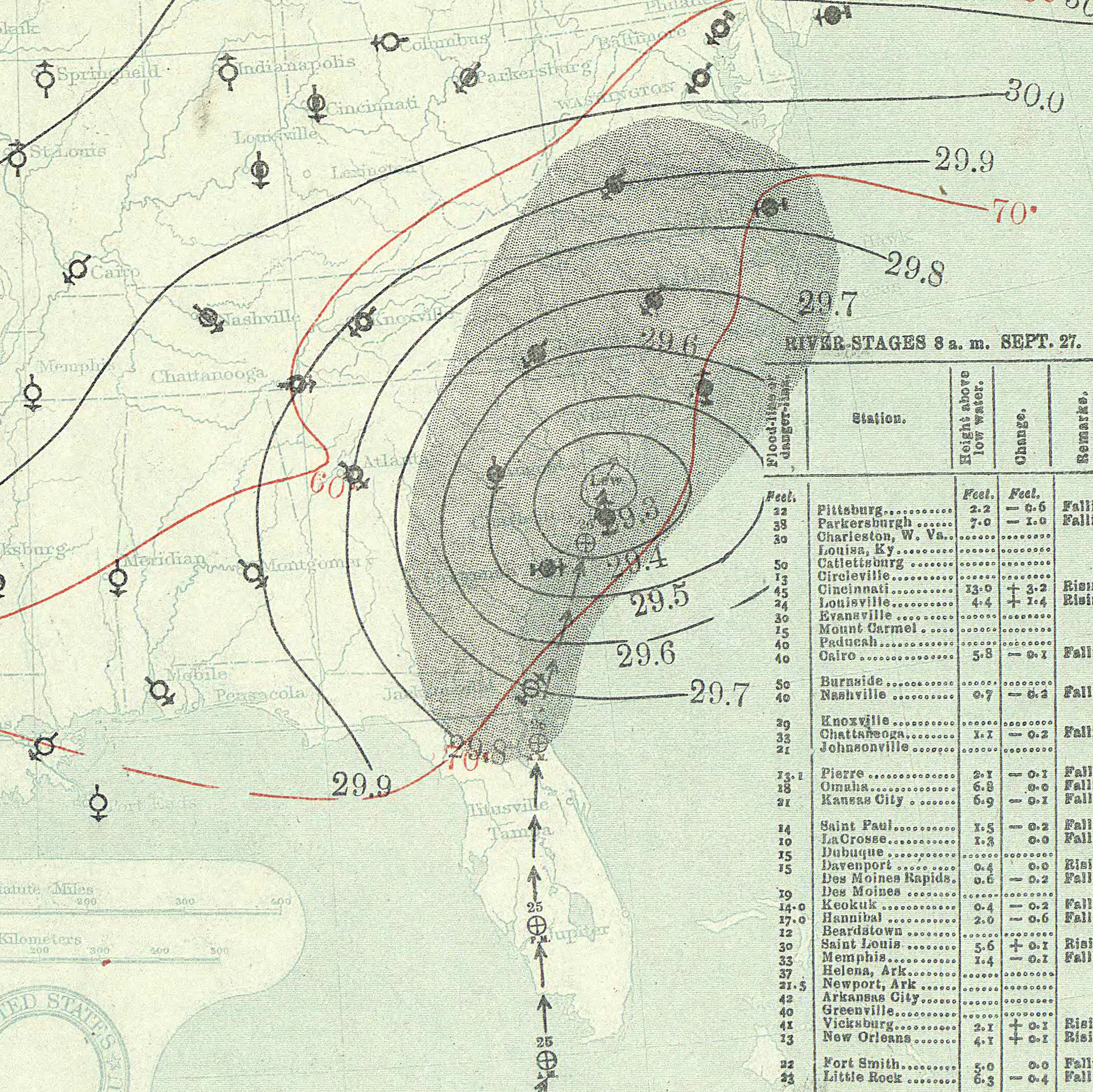
- Weather map of the hurricane on September 27 over South Carolina

Meteorological history
- Formed: September 18, 1894
- Dissipated: October 1, 1894

Category 3 major hurricane
- 1-minute sustained (SSHWS/NWS)
- Highest winds: 120 mph (195 km/h)
- Lowest pressure: 975 mbar (hPa); 28.79 inHg

Overall effects
- Fatalities: 227
- Damage: $5.09 million (1894 USD)
- Areas affected: Lesser Antilles, Greater Antilles, East Coast of the United States
- Part of the 1894 Atlantic hurricane season

The 1894 Greater Antilles hurricane, also known as the San Mateo storm in Puerto Rico and the Huracan de Sagua la Grande in Cuba, caused significant impacts in Hispaniola, Cuba, and along the East Coast of the United States, especially in Florida. The fourth known tropical cyclone and second hurricane of the season, this system was first observed well east of the Lesser Antilles on September 18. Gradually intensifying as it headed west-northwestward, the cyclone became a hurricane on September 19 and a major hurricane on the next day while passing near Martinique. After entering the Caribbean Sea, the storm peaked with winds of 120 mph (195 km/h) on September 21, but weakened to a Category 2 hurricane on the modern-day Saffir–Simpson scale prior to making landfall in the Dominican Republic late on September 22. Although the system weakened to a Category 1 hurricane before reaching the Gulf of Gonâve, the cyclone briefly became a Category 2 hurricane again before striking Cuba near Santiago de Cuba on September 23.

Moving west-northwestward along or near the south coast of Cuba, the hurricane turned northward over Matanzas Province on September 24 and briefly weakened to a tropical storm. The cyclone re-intensified into a hurricane as it emerged into the Straits of Florida on September 25 and then made two landfalls in Florida on that day, first on Key West and then near Punta Rassa. After turning north-northeastward and briefly weakening to a tropical storm again, the system re-attained hurricane status shortly before re-entering the Atlantic on September 26. The hurricane made another landfall near Port Royal, South Carolina, early on September 27. Thereafter, the cyclone curved north-northeastward and weakened to a tropical storm over far southeastern North Carolina early on September 28. Briefly re-emerging into the Atlantic, the cyclone made its final landfall near Atlantic Beach. After again emerging into the Atlantic, the storm became a hurricane on September 29. However, the cyclone weakened back to a tropical storm on September 30. The storm was last noted on October 1 east of New England.

The cyclone produced squalls and rough seas in the Lesser Antilles, leading to 10 deaths on Saint Kitts and 3 more fatalities on Antigua due to capsized vessels. Damage also occurred to agriculture, communications, trees, and roads in the region. Numerous structures on Hispaniola suffered some degree of damage, with 500 homes and 2 churches destroyed. In Cuba, flooding occurred across much of the island, especially in Sagua La Grande after the Sagua la Grande River overflowed, with floodwaters reaching 8 ft (2.4 m) above ground level in a hotel. The storm destroyed roughly 70 homes and substantially damaged 200 others, rendering about 3,000 families homeless. Approximately 200 people died in Cuba as a result of the storm, while damage in the country totaled about $4 million. Rough seas capsized or destroyed several vessels offshore Florida, causing 14 deaths. Winds damaged a number of structures in the state, especially in Jacksonville and Tampa, while storm surge and abnormally high tides entered several buildings in St. Augustine. Damage throughout Florida totaled about $1 million. Adverse conditions produced by the storm caused some impacts farther north, primarily crop damage and coastal flooding, including more than $75,000 in damage in New York.

== Meteorological history ==
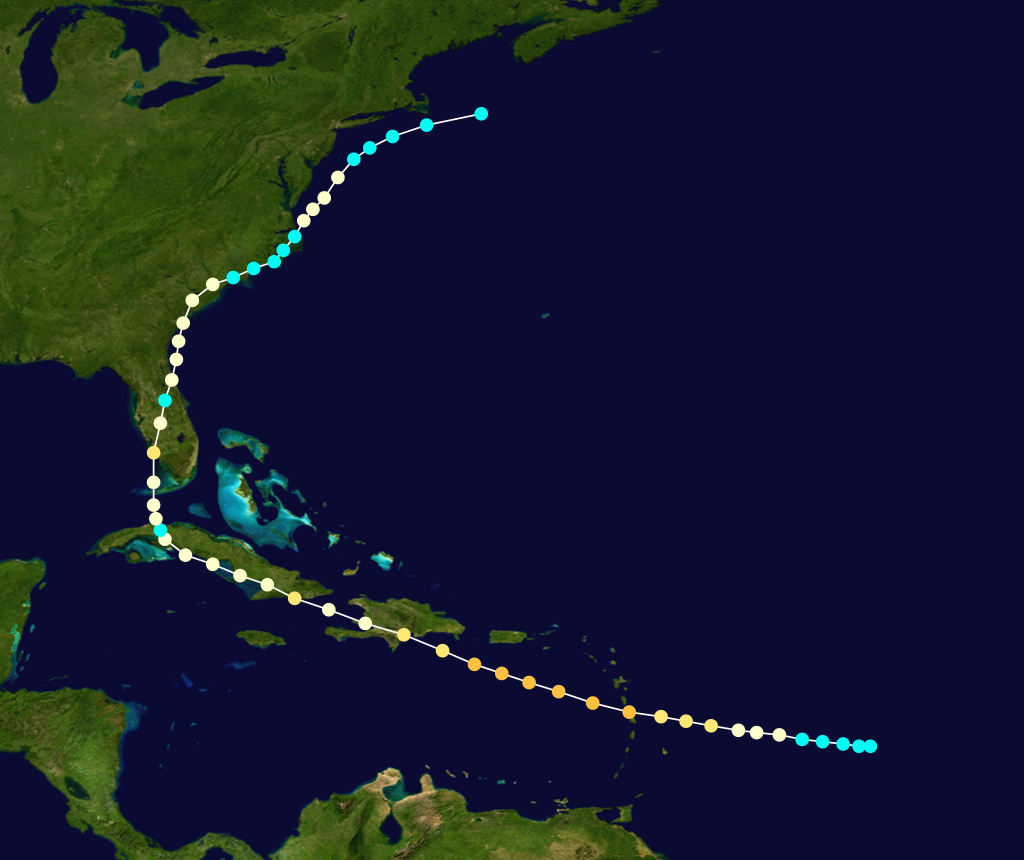
Map plotting the storm's track and intensity, according to the Saffir–Simpson scale Map key Saffir–Simpson scale Tropical depression (≤38 mph, ≤62 km/h) Tropical storm (39–73 mph, 63–118 km/h) Category 1 (74–95 mph, 119–153 km/h) Category 2 (96–110 mph, 154–177 km/h) Category 3 (111–129 mph, 178–208 km/h) Category 4 (130–156 mph, 209–251 km/h) Category 5 (≥157 mph, ≥252 km/h) Unknown Storm type Tropical cyclone Subtropical cyclone Extratropical cyclone, remnant low, tropical disturbance, or monsoon depression

Ship observations first indicated the presence of a tropical storm early on September 18 approximately 600 mi (965 km) east of Barbados. The cyclone moved west-northwestward and gradually intensified, reaching hurricane status around 06:00 UTC on the following day. By early on September 20, the storm is estimated to have strengthened into a Category 2 hurricane on the modern-day Saffir–Simpson scale. Further intensification occurred, with the system becoming a Category 3 hurricane around 18:00 UTC as it passed just north of Martinique. The cyclone peaked with maximum sustained winds of 120 mph (195 km/h) early on September 21 while entering the eastern Caribbean Sea.

As it approached Hispaniola, the storm weakened slightly and fell to Category 2 intensity before making landfall in the present-day Dominican Republic near the Azua–Barahona provinces border with winds of 105 mph (165 km/h) at 12:00 UTC on September 22. The cyclone quickly weakened to a Category 1 hurricane before emerging into the Gulf of Gonâve near Port-au-Prince, Haiti, several hours later. Around 06:00 UTC on September 23, the system re-intensified into a Category 2 hurricane just prior to making landfall in Cuba near Santiago de Cuba with winds of 100 mph (155 km/h). The storm quickly weakened to a Category 1 hurricane again and then moved along or close to the south coast of Cuba throughout much of September 23 and early on September 24, before turning northwestward near Playa Girón in Matanzas Province shortly after 06:00 UTC. Late on September 24, the hurricane briefly weakened to a tropical storm, but soon re-strengthened into a hurricane early on September 25 after emerging into the Straits of Florida about halfway between Havana and Matanzas.

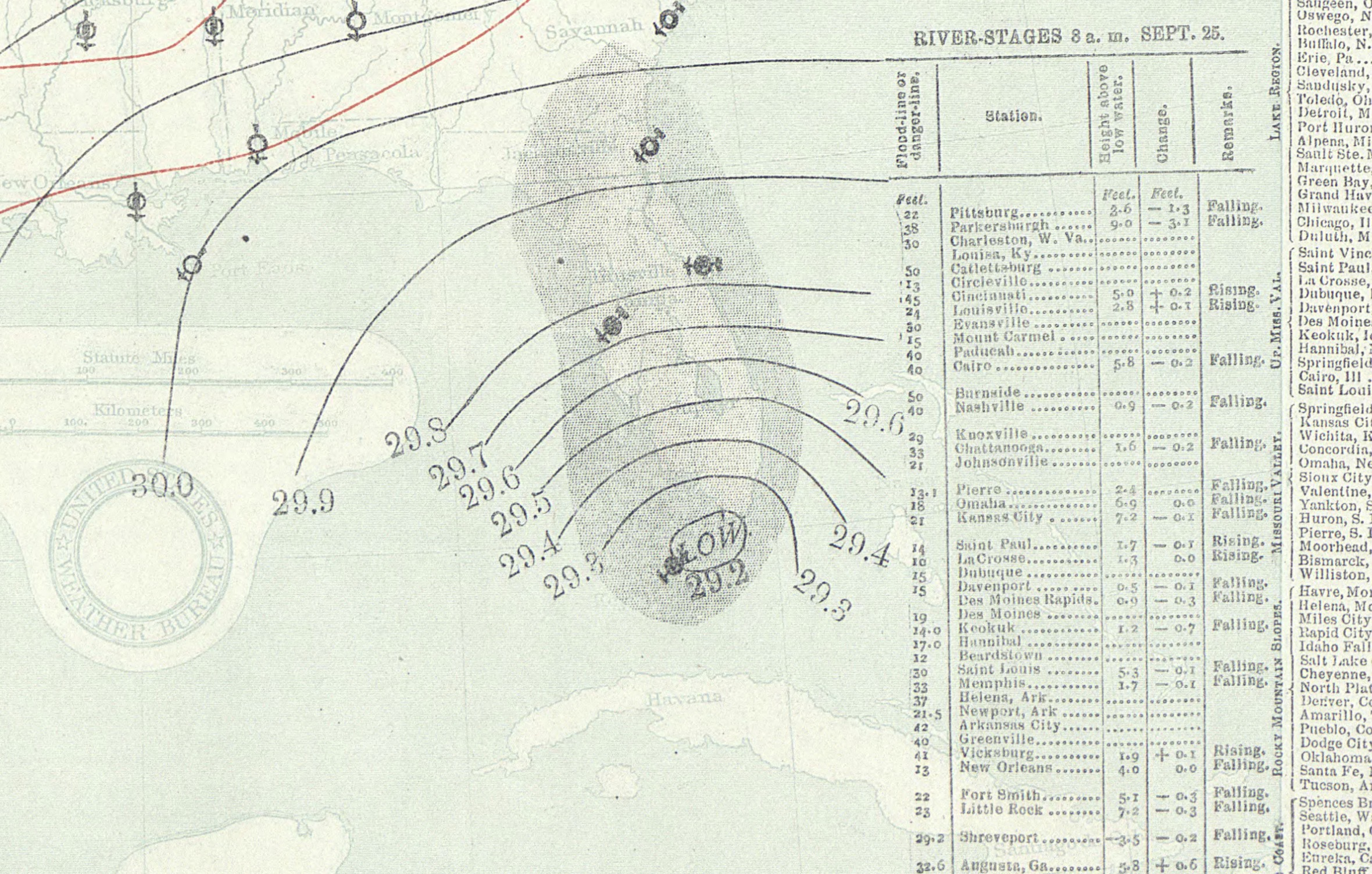
Surface weather analysis of the hurricane making landfall in Southwest Florida on September 25

After moving generally northward across the Straits of Florida, the cyclone made landfall in Key West, Florida, around 11:00 UTC on September 25 with winds of 80 mph (130 km/h). Reanalysis suggests that the hurricane intensified further, becoming a Category 2 hurricane again by 18:00 UTC, about one hour before striking near Punta Rassa, Florida, with winds of 105 mph (165 km/h). Upon landfall, the system had an atmospheric pressure of 975 mbar (28.8 inHg), the lowest known in relation to the storm. The hurricane curved north-northeastward and briefly weakened to a tropical storm near Orlando around 06:00 UTC on September 26, before re-strengthening into a hurricane just prior to emerging into the Atlantic near modern-day Palm Coast about six hours later. At about 07:00 UTC on the following day, the system made landfall near Port Royal, South Carolina, with winds of 90 mph (150 km/h). The hurricane then curved east-northward and weakened to a tropical storm over far southeastern North Carolina early on September 28. Briefly re-emerging into the Atlantic, the cyclone made another landfall near Atlantic Beach with winds of 70 mph (110 km/h). After again entering the Atlantic from northern Dare County, the storm re-intensified into a hurricane early on September 29. However, the cyclone weakened back to a tropical storm about 24 hours later while passing offshore New Jersey. The storm was last noted early on October 1 about 120 mi (195 km) east of Nantucket, Massachusetts.

== Impact ==
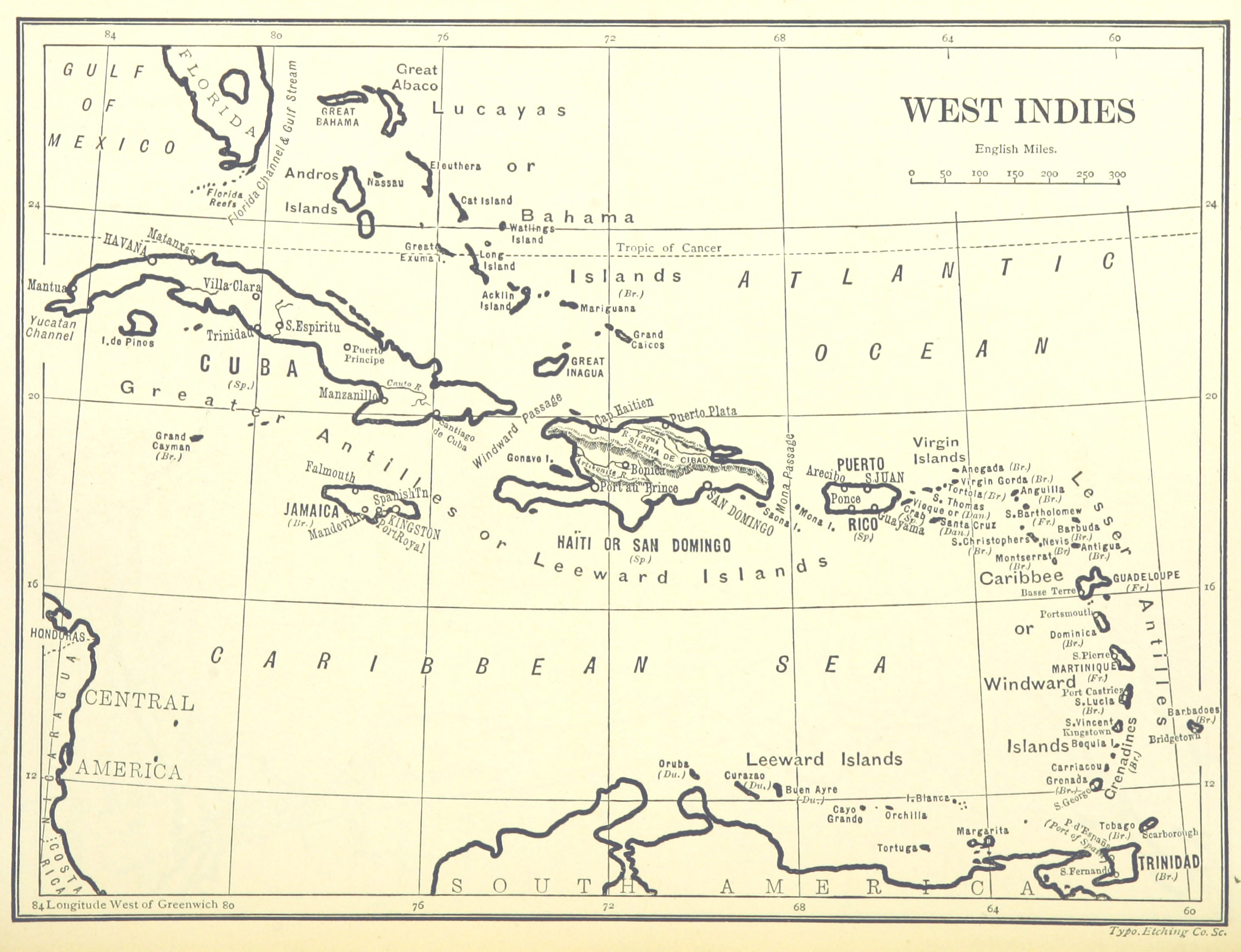
Map of the Caribbean in 1891

On Martinique, the storm beached and destroyed the schooners Apaze and Midinia. The storm capsized several small craft on Saint Kitts, which reportedly caused ten deaths, while another three fatalities occurred on Antigua after a sloop wrecked. "Cocoa and lime estates suffered" on Dominica, according to the St. Croix Avis. Additionally, the hurricane wrecked the schooner Lettie Linwood, partially demolished a jetty, and damaged roads. Strong winds on Guadeloupe toppled many trees and telegraph wires in Pointe-à-Pitre, severing communications with interior parts of the island. Wind gusts over 40 mph (64 km/h) were observed at the weather station in Mayagüez, Puerto Rico. Throughout Hispaniola, the hurricane destroyed more than five hundred homes and two churches; numerous other structures sustained damage, mainly having their roofs blown off.

The storm dropped heavy rainfall in portions of Cuba, especially in the central parts of the country, where an observation station recorded 6.6 in (167 mm) of precipitation on September 23 and an additional 9.5 inches (242 mm) of rainfall on the following day. Consequently, the Mayaneya, Sagua la Grande, Yabucito, and Yabu overflowed. In Sagua La Grande, approximately one-third of the town's residents evacuated, while those unable to escape climbed to the roofs of two-story structures. Floodwaters reached 5 ft (1.5 m) above ground at the railroad tracks, while up to 8 ft (2.4 m) of water was reported inside a hotel. Some sources indicated that floodwaters reached as high as 75 to 95 ft (23 to 29 m) above ground, though meteorologist José Fernández Partagás strongly doubted these reports, "it seems too high even if it were in feet instead of meters". Several other communities in central Cuba experienced flooding, including Cruces, Lajas, and Santo Domingo. Much of the region also reported extensive losses to sugarcane and heavy damage to gas works and electric plants. The cyclone left approximately 3,000 families homeless, with about 70 homes destroyed and 200 others severely damaged. Additionally, the hurricane demolished 47 homes in Santa Cruz del Sur. Approximately 200 fatalities occurred in Cuba, while damage totaled approximately $4 million.

On September 24, the Weather Bureau ordered storm signals in Florida for the Cedar Keys, Jupiter, Punta Gorda, and Tampa, before soon expanding the warned area to include Wilmington, North Carolina, to New Orleans, Louisiana. The Weather Bureau also predicted violent gales in Florida, Georgia, Alabama, and South Carolina. Additionally, shipping interests as far north as New York City received notice of the storm on September 24, particularly for vessels heading southward.

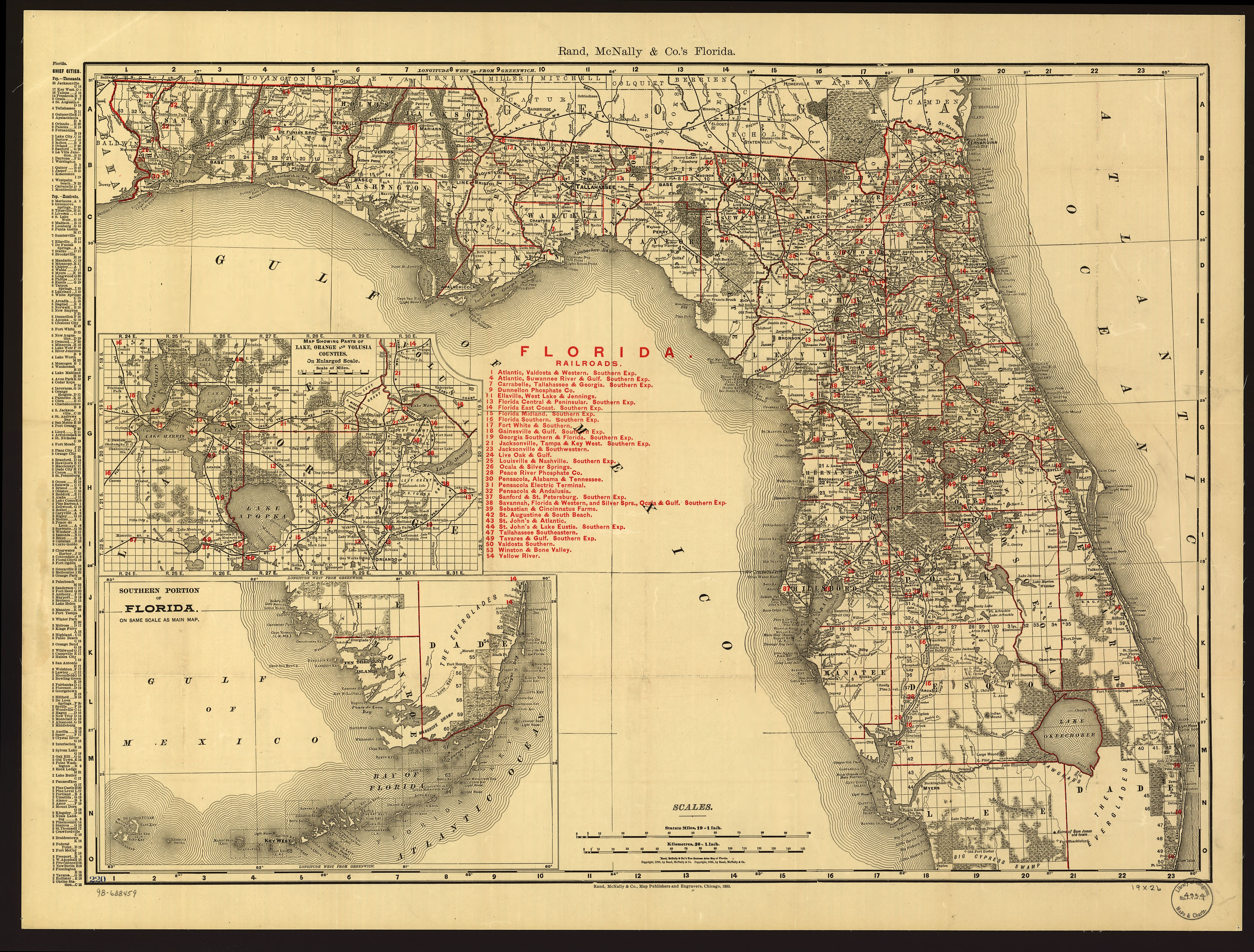
1900 indexed county and township pocket map of Florida

In Florida, the island of Key West observed 5-minute sustained winds of 87 mph (140 km/h) and gusts up to 104 mph (167 km/h), while the captain of the schooner Consiston, situated just west of Key West, estimated that winds reached as high as 120 mph (190 km/h). The island experienced its worst storm since 1876. Winds downed many trees and fences, though most buildings sustained little damage. Many cigar factories lost a significant amount of their products after water entered the buildings, while shipping also suffered extensive losses. Unconfirmed reports initially stated that the schooner Emily B. sank near Key West with the loss of the entire crew. However, The Tropical Sun later reported that both the ship and crew were safe. Farther east, the barque Brandon capsized at Crocker Reef, drowning 14 of the 17 men aboard, including the captain.

The storm dropped heavy rainfall across mainland Florida, including a 54-hour total of 13.78 in (350 mm) of precipitation in Tampa, a storm total of 11.11 in (282 mm) in Jacksonville, and a 48-hour total of 7.72 in (196 mm) in Titusville. Offshore, the ship Julia became stranded at Hillsboro Inlet, while two bodies, several wine caskets, and other merchandise washed ashore between the Lake Worth Lagoon and New River. The storm swept away a bridge along the Lake Worth Lagoon. At Jupiter, thousands of dead fish washed ashore. The town recorded sustained winds of 50 mph (80 km/h).

Several cigar factories were wrecked in Tampa. The storm also destroyed many smaller homes and buildings, as well as a church and hotel. Damage to buildings alone in Tampa reached approximately $50,000. Watercraft in the St. Johns River at Palatka suffered significant impact and 12 wharves between Palatka and Green Cove Springs disappeared. In St. Augustine, storm surge and abnormally high tides overtopped the seawalls and "made rivers of the streets", according to The Times-Union. Water entered many homes and the Ponce de Leon Hotel. In Jacksonville, strong winds and heavy rainfall deroofed the city's largest hotel, the Everett Hotel. The storm also destroyed an unfinished railroad station and two homes. Nearby, abnormally high tides caused extensive damage in Mayport and Pablo Beach, with all of the docks and wharves destroyed at the former. Throughout the state, a loss of about 20% of orange crops occurred. Overall, damage in Florida exceeded $1 million.

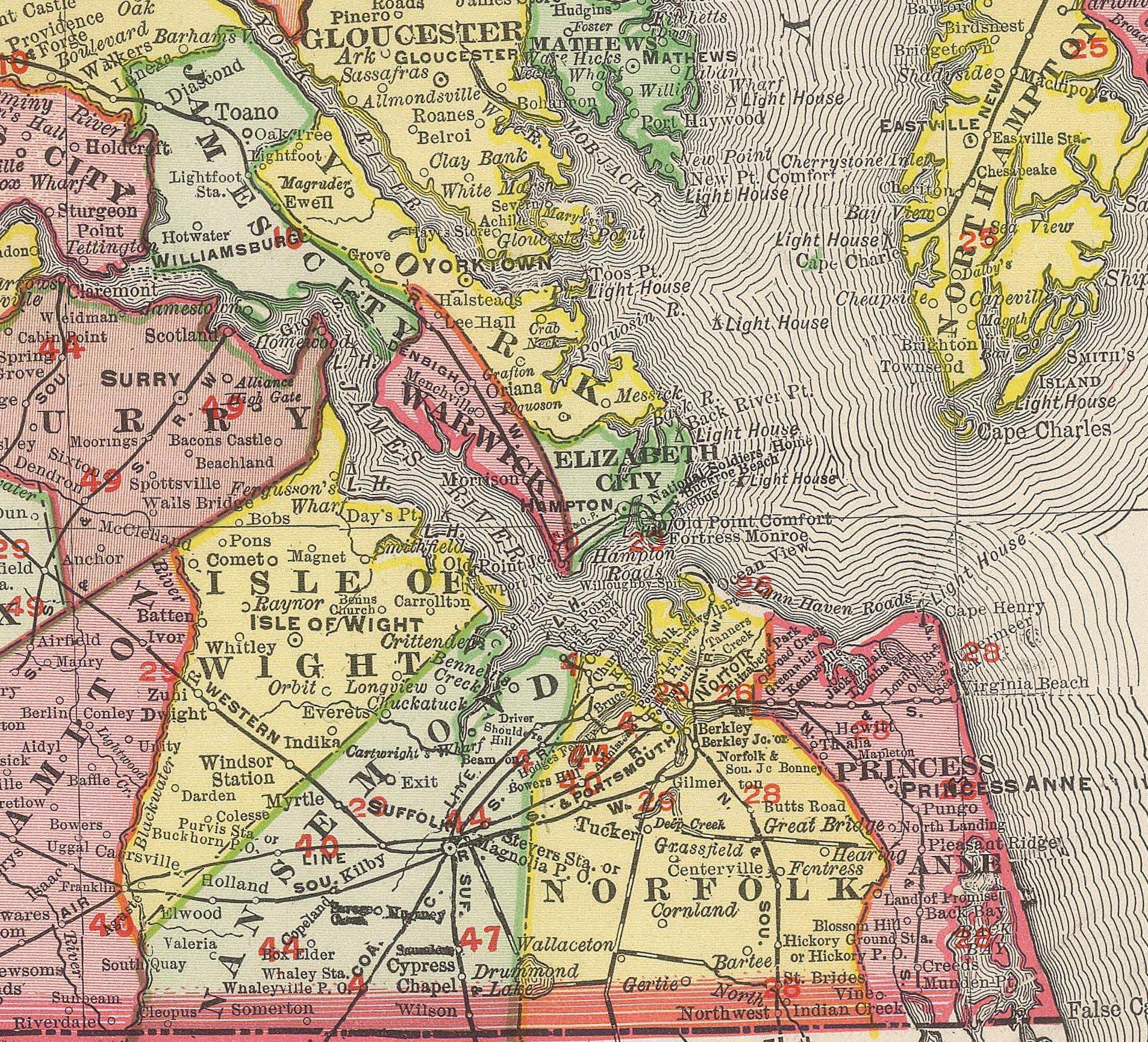
1903 map of coastal Virginia showing the former Princess Anne County

In Georgia, the Sea Islands "escaped with practically no damage.", according to the Savannah Morning News. Wind gusts reached 88 mph (142 km/h) on Tybee Island, destroying a windmill. On Isle of Hope, a few fruit trees and fences fell over. The hurricane downed some trees branches and limbs and toppled telegraph and telephone wires in Savannah. Coastal regions of South Carolina and other areas slightly farther inland experienced major damage to corn, cotton, and rice crops. Tides reached about 10 ft (3.0 m) above normal at Charleston. At Cape Romain, the schooner Benjamin F. Lee wrecked, with the ship and cargo having a combined value of about $18,000. Some parts of coastal North Carolina reported strong winds, including 5-minute sustained wind speeds of 54 mph (87 km/h) in Southport and 60 mph (97 km/h) in Kitty Hawk. In Virginia, Cape Henry observed 5-minute sustained winds of 80 mph (130 km/h), along with gusts up to 90 mph (150 km/h). These winds severed telegraph lines along the coast. Princess Anne County, now part of Virginia Beach, suffered some loss of corn and potato crops. Two tenement houses were destroyed. On Cobb Island, waves washed away about 200 ft (61 m) of sand and inundated the island with about 3 ft (0.91 m) of water, sweeping away outhouses, fences, some pigs, and all vegetation.

In New Jersey, the hurricane produced rough surf in the vicinity of Atlantic City, while the Asbury Park Press noted that "the meadows between this city [Atlantic City] and the mainland are like a great bay." Tides generated by the storm in New York swept away about 200 ft (61 m) of the outer bulkhead and severely damaged the inner bulkhead at Brighton Beach, causing a portion of the Brighton Beach Hotel to sag enough to induce fears of its collapse. The cyclone also washed out the marine railway from Brighton Beach to Manhattan Beach, including tearing up boardwalks and platforms leading to the former. Additionally, a pavilion bar and lunch room were carried away. Conservative estimates placed damage in New York at over $75,000. The storm wrecked a number of vessels as far north as New England. Strong winds along coastal Massachusetts led to a large loss of fruit from trees in Plymouth. A large elm tree fell in Lynn, causing serious injuries to a woman.

== See also ==
- List of Cuba hurricanes
- List of Florida hurricanes (pre-1900)
- List of New Jersey hurricanes
- List of New York hurricanes
- List of North Carolina hurricanes (pre-1900)
