= Crocker Reef =

Coral reef in the Florida Keys, US

- Location within Florida Location within the Caribbean

Location
- Location: Caribbean
- Coordinates: 24°54′30″N 080°31′30″W
- Country: United States

Geology
- Type: reef

Crocker Reef (or Crocker Ridges) is a coral reef located within the Florida Keys National Marine Sanctuary. It lies to the southeast of Plantation Key, and is near Davis Reef. Unlike many reefs in the Sanctuary, it is not within a Sanctuary Preservation Area (SPA).

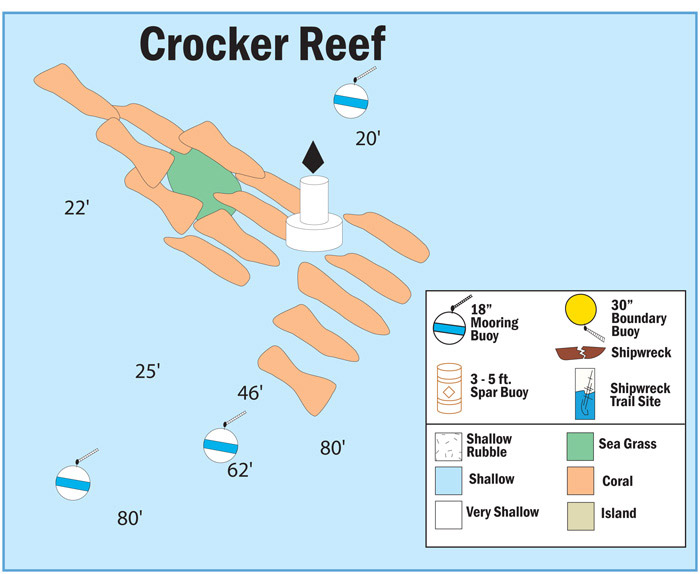
NOAA map of the reef
