= Paterson Daily Press =

Former newspaper in Paterson, New Jersey

The Paterson Daily Press was a newspaper in Paterson, New Jersey published from 1863 to 1907.
