= Joblin =

Joblin is a surname. Notable people with the surname include:

- Christine Joblin (fl. from 1989), French astrochemist
- Kate Joblin (born 1961 or 1962), New Zealand local politician

== See also ==
- Joblin crow parrot, another name for the Queen parrotfish
