= Christine Joblin =

French astrochemist

- Education: Ph.D. in astrophysics (1992)
- Alma mater: Paris Diderot University
- Awards: Chevalier de la Légion d'Honneur (2016); Ordre national du Mérite (2022)
- Scientific career
- Fields: Astrochemistry
- Institutions: Institut de Recherche en Astrophysique et Planétologie
- Thesis: Spectroscopie de molécules aromatiques. Test du modèle PAH en astrophysique (1992)

Christine Joblin is a French astrochemist who uses spectroscopy to study photodissociation and the polycyclic aromatic hydrocarbons in cosmic dust. Beyond her experimental and observational work, she also contributed to the first clear finding of buckminsterfullerene in a meteorite, a ureilite that exploded over the Nubian Desert in late 2008. She is a director of research for the French National Centre for Scientific Research (CNRS), affiliated with the Institut de Recherche en Astrophysique et Planétologie in Toulouse.

== Education and career ==
Joblin earned a master's degree in astrophysics in 1989 through study at Paris Diderot University, Paris-Sud University, and the École normale supérieure (Paris). She completed a Ph.D. in astrophysics in 1992 at Paris Diderot University, and has a 2005 habilitation at Toulouse III - Paul Sabatier University.

After postdoctoral research at NASA's Ames Research Center in California from 1992 to 1995, she has been a CNRS researcher in Toulouse since 1995, originally with the Centre d'Étude Spatiale des Rayonnements (CESR, the Center for the Study of Radiation in Space). She was promoted to director of research in 2007. In 2011 CESR and several other laboratories merged to form the Institut de Recherche en Astrophysique et Planétologie (IRAP, the Institute for Research in Astrophysics and Planetology), her current affiliation.

== Outreach ==
In an effort to bring her research to a wider audience, Joblin co-created an English-language comic book and webcomic, Estrella, with visual artist Lorenzo Palloni. Its plot features a young girl who (as in the 1966 film Fantastic Voyage) is shrunk to nanoscopic scale to learn about the creation of cosmic dust in dying stars. It was published in 2018 by ERCcOMICS, a program of the Publications Office of the European Union.

== Recognition ==
Joblin won the 2001 young scientist prize of the Société Française d'Astronomie et d'Astrophysique, and received the CNRS Silver Medal for 2015. She was the 2020 winner of the Huy Duong Bui grand prize of the French Academy of Sciences.

She was named a chevalier of the Legion of Honour in 2016, and was named to the Ordre national du Mérite in 2022.
