= Vauclair =

Vauclair may refer to:

- Bouconville-Vauclair, commune in Aisne department, Picardy, France
- Vauclair castle, castle in Poitou-Charentes
- Vauclair Abbey, Cistercian abbey

In people

- Julien Vauclair (born 1979), Swiss ice hockey player
- Sylvie Vauclair (born 1946), French astrophysicist
