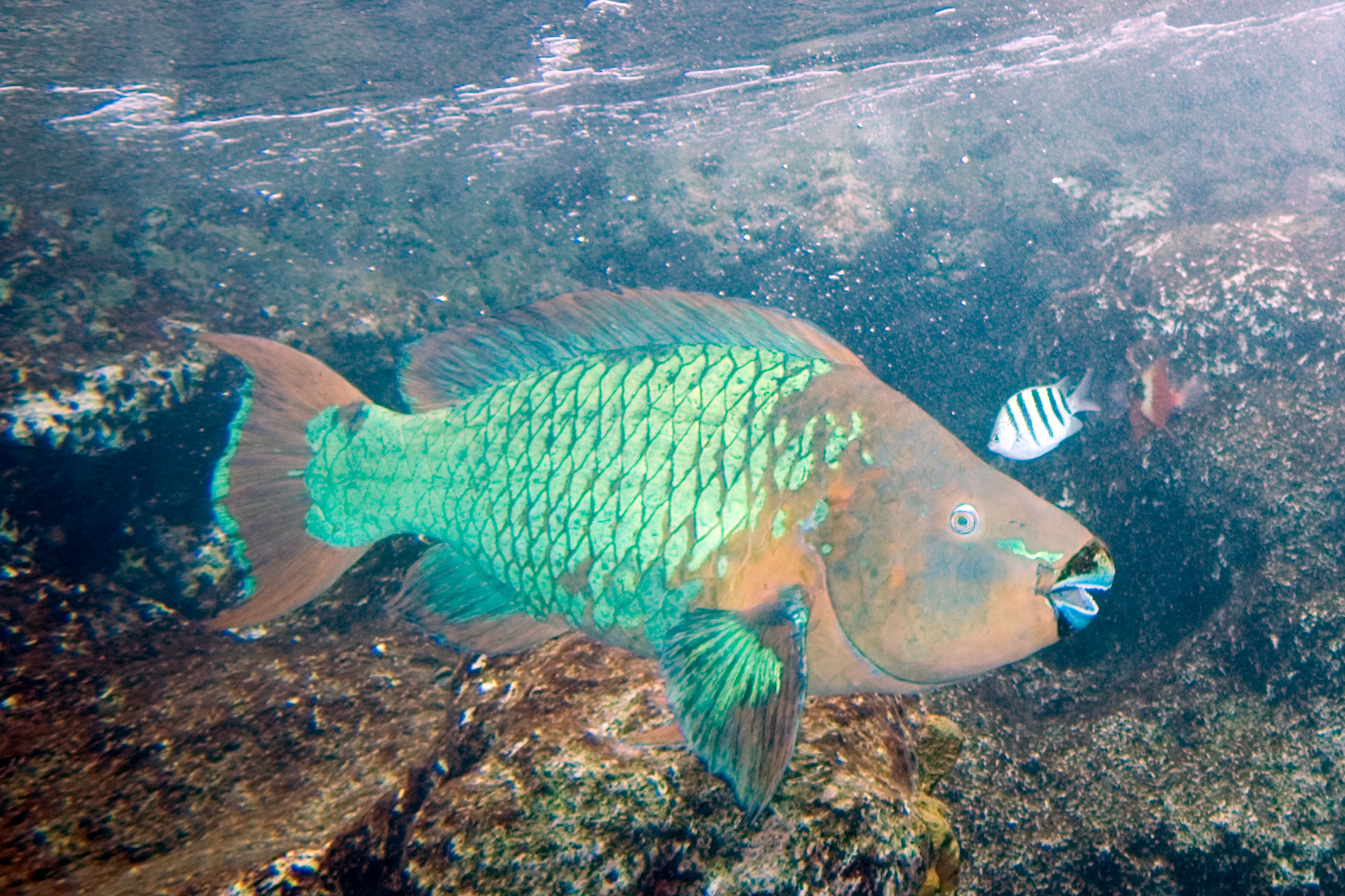

Conservation status
- Near Threatened (IUCN 3.1)

Scientific classification
- Kingdom: Animalia
- Phylum: Chordata
- Class: Actinopterygii
- Order: Labriformes
- Family: Labridae
- Genus: Scarus
- Species: S. guacamaia

Binomial name
- Scarus guacamaia Cuvier, 1829

Synonyms
- Scarus pleianus Poey, 1861; Scarus turchesius Valenciennes, 1840

= Rainbow parrotfish =

Species of fish

The rainbow parrotfish (Scarus guacamaia) is a species of fish in the family Scaridae.

== Description ==
S. guacamaia is the second largest species of parrotfish after the humphead parrotfish, and the largest parrotfish in the Atlantic, reaching 1.2 m (3.9 ft) in length, 20 kg in weight and a maximum age of 16 years. It has a greenish-brown overall colouration; the fins are dull orange with tongues of green. Its dental plates are blue-green. Sexes appear alike.

It is most closely related to two other large-bodied parrotfish species, S. coelestinus and S. trispinosus.

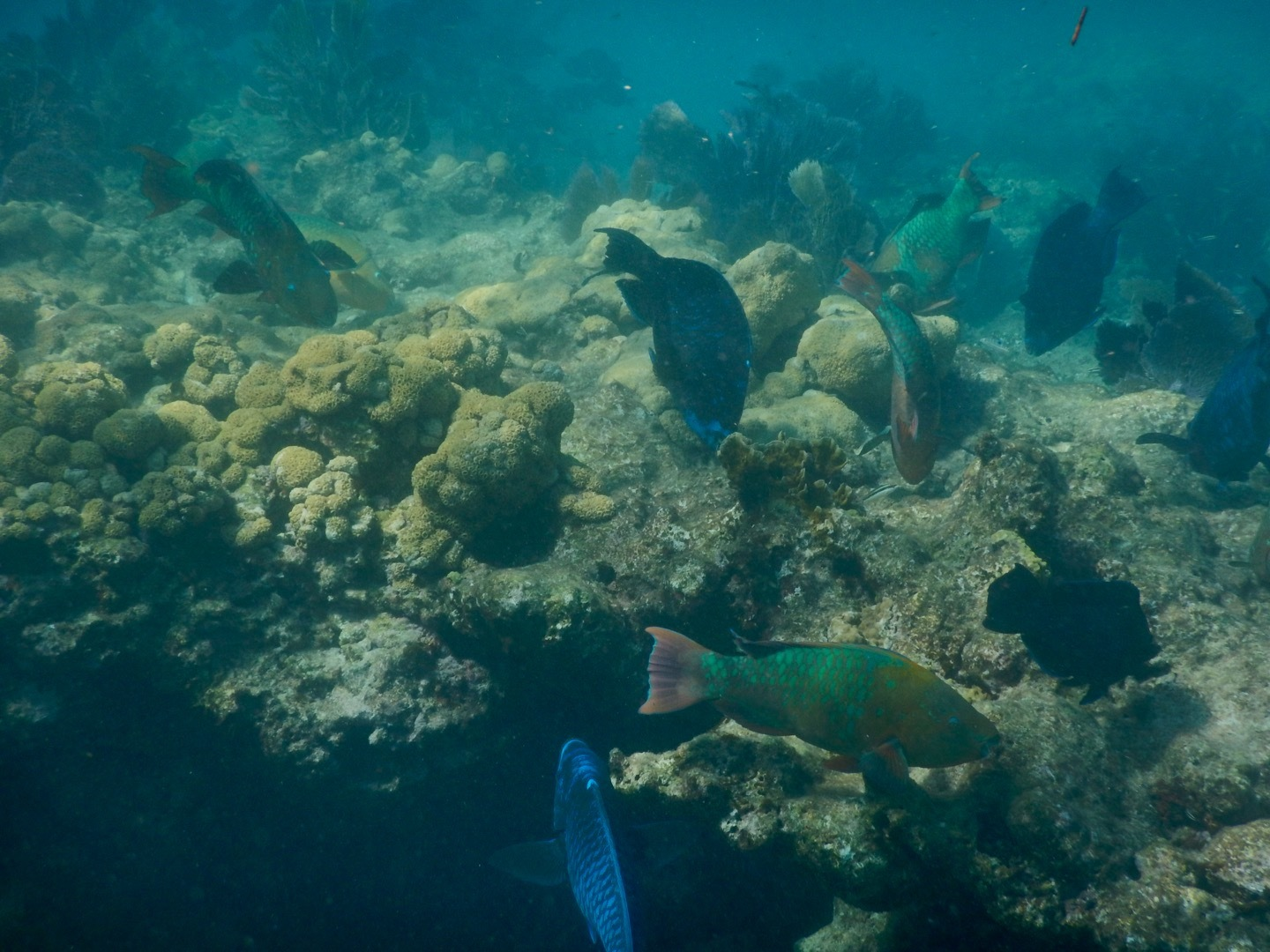
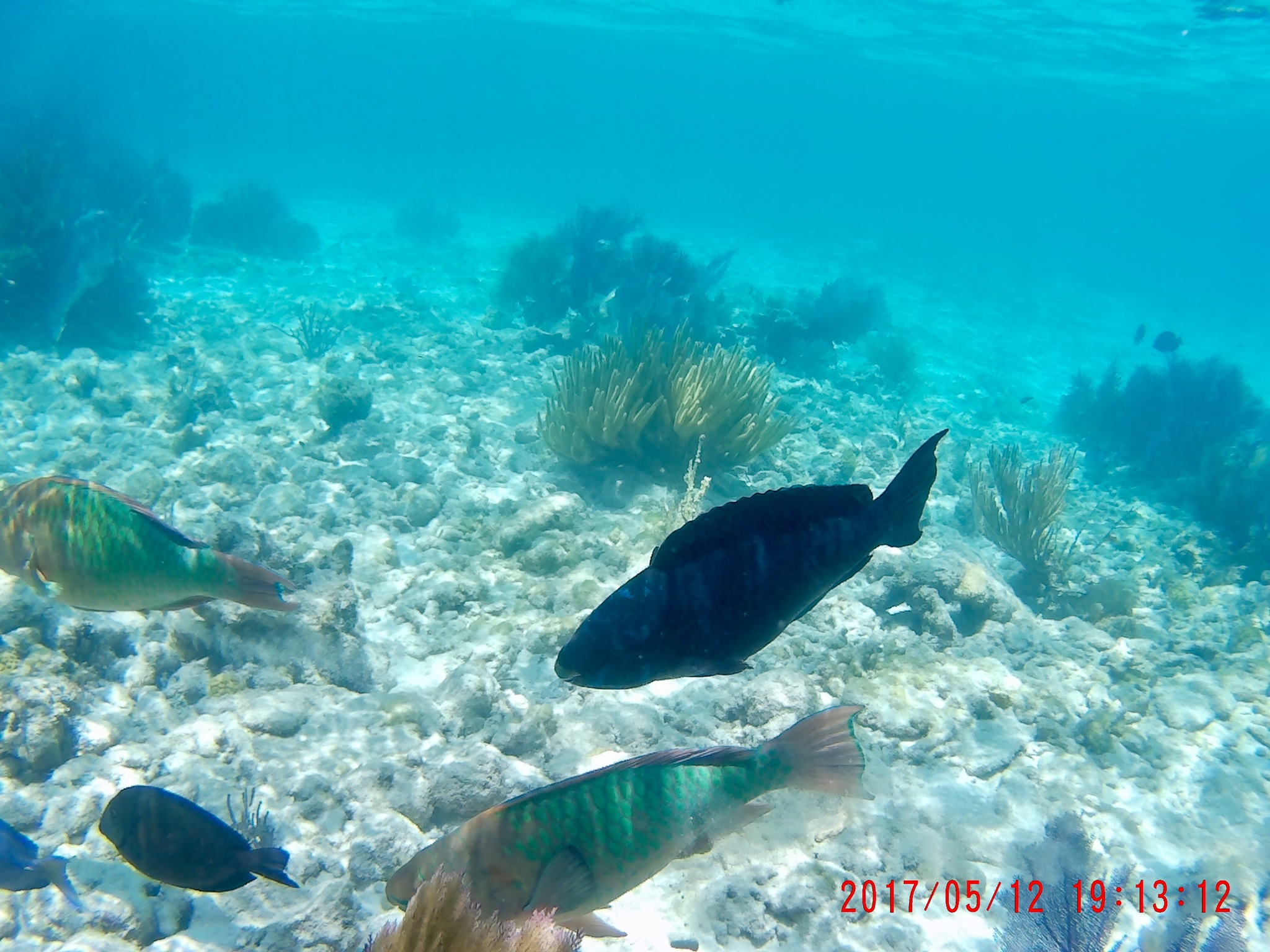
S. guacamaia with S. coelestinus in Florida, two extremely closely related species. Unlike most Scarus species, these two are not sexually dimorphic. Due to their similar appearance and sympatric distribution, they were often thought to be colour phases of the same species until the 1960s.

== Distribution and habitat ==
The rainbow parrotfish has a relatively wide distribution in the western Atlantic, and can be found from Bermuda through South Florida, the Bahamas and the Caribbean to Venezuela. It inhabits coral reefs, mangroves and sea grass beds in shallow waters, at depths of 3–25 m.

== Ecology ==
S. guacamaia is primarily a detritivore, feeding on detritus, bacterial colonies and meiofauna but also taking sponges. Young fish appear to recruit mostly to mangroves.

== Conservation ==
S. guacamaia was formerly classified as vulnerable due to overfishing and habitat loss, but because the presently available data do not allow an estimate of the population decline, it is now considered near threatened by the IUCN. It is relatively rare in most of its range, but more common in Bermuda. The rainbow parrotfish is widely harvested in subsistence fisheries in many parts of the Caribbean.

== Gallery ==
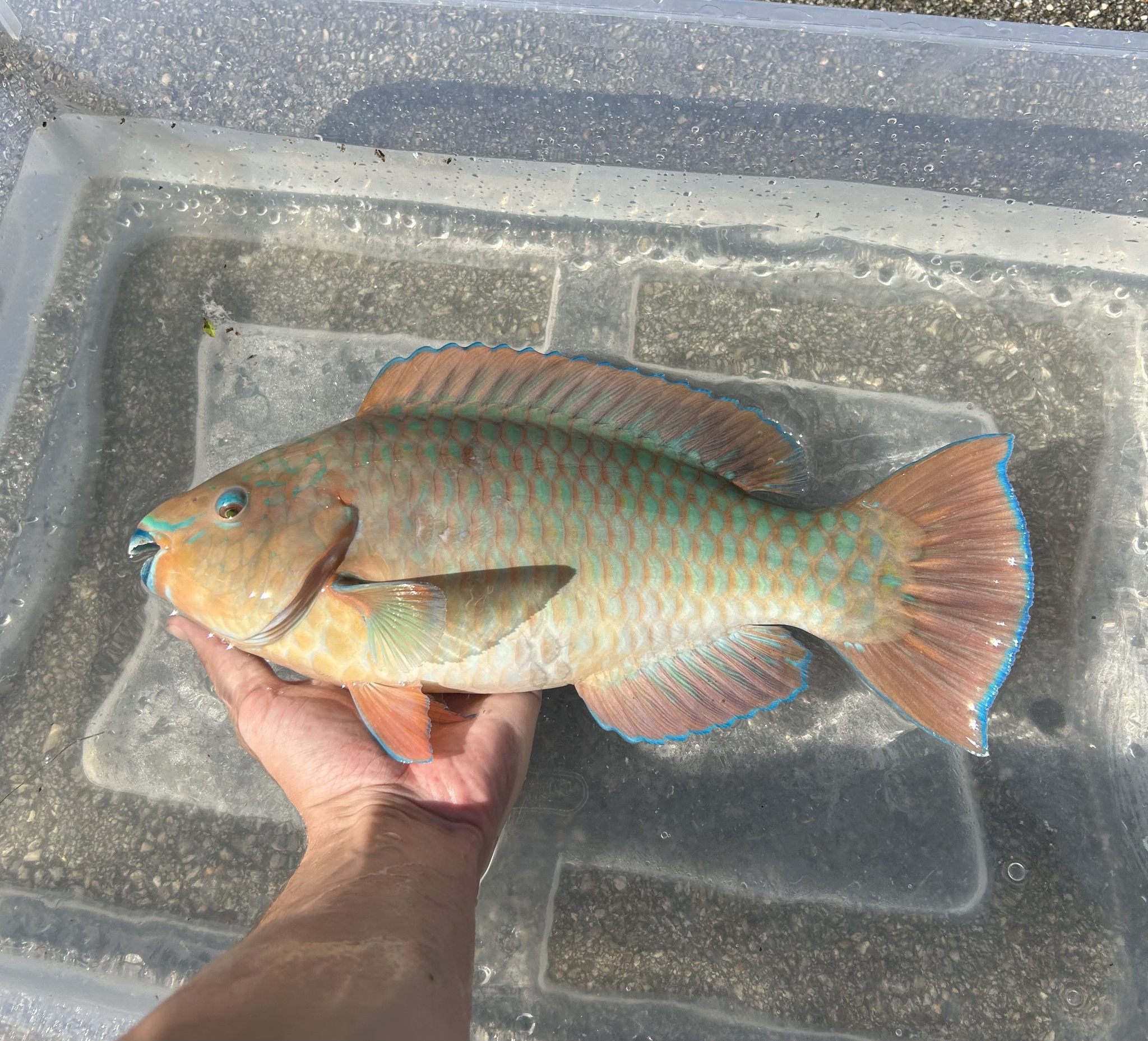
Small individual, in Florida

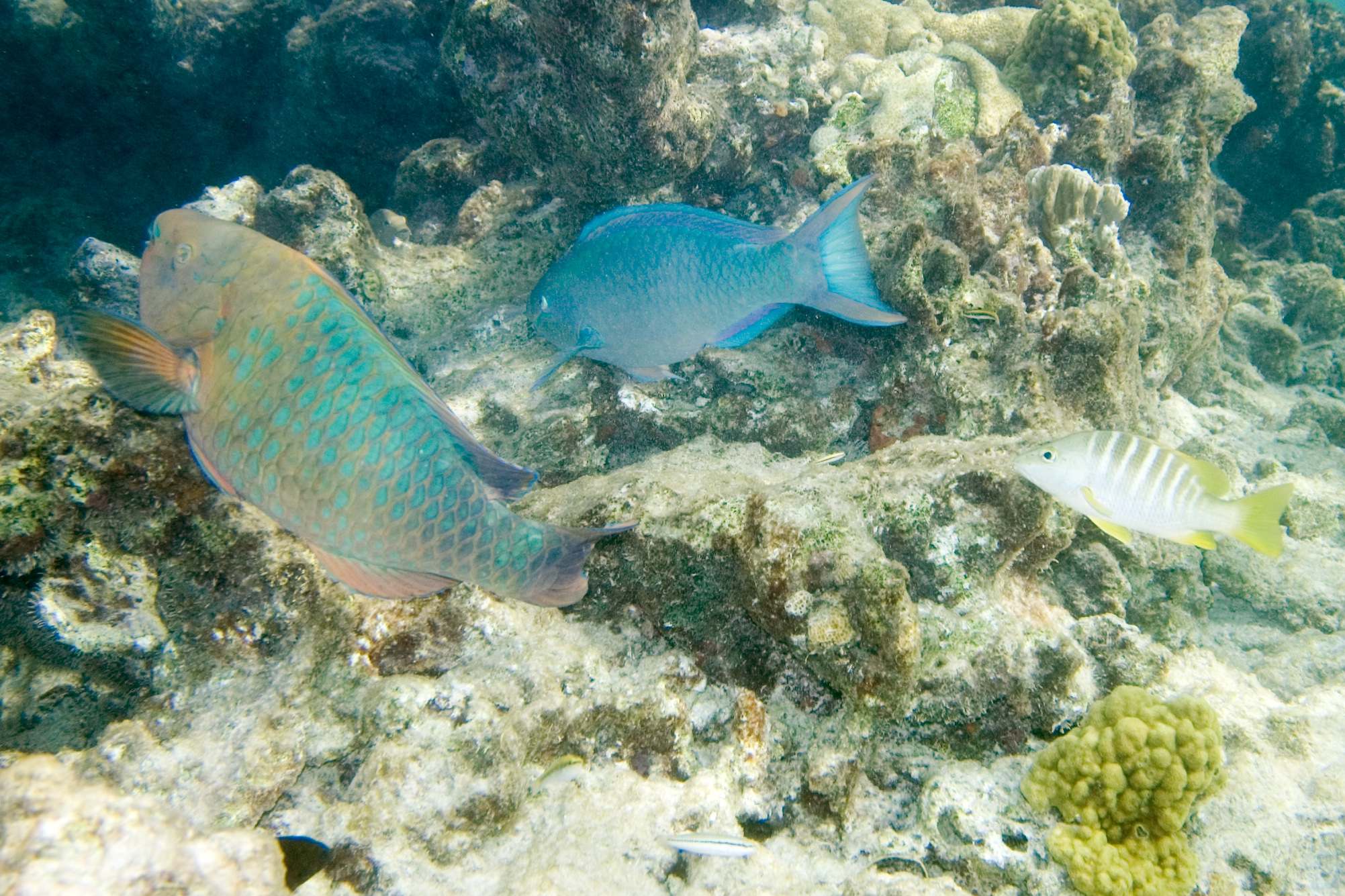
With a queen parrotfish (S. vetula), in Bonaire

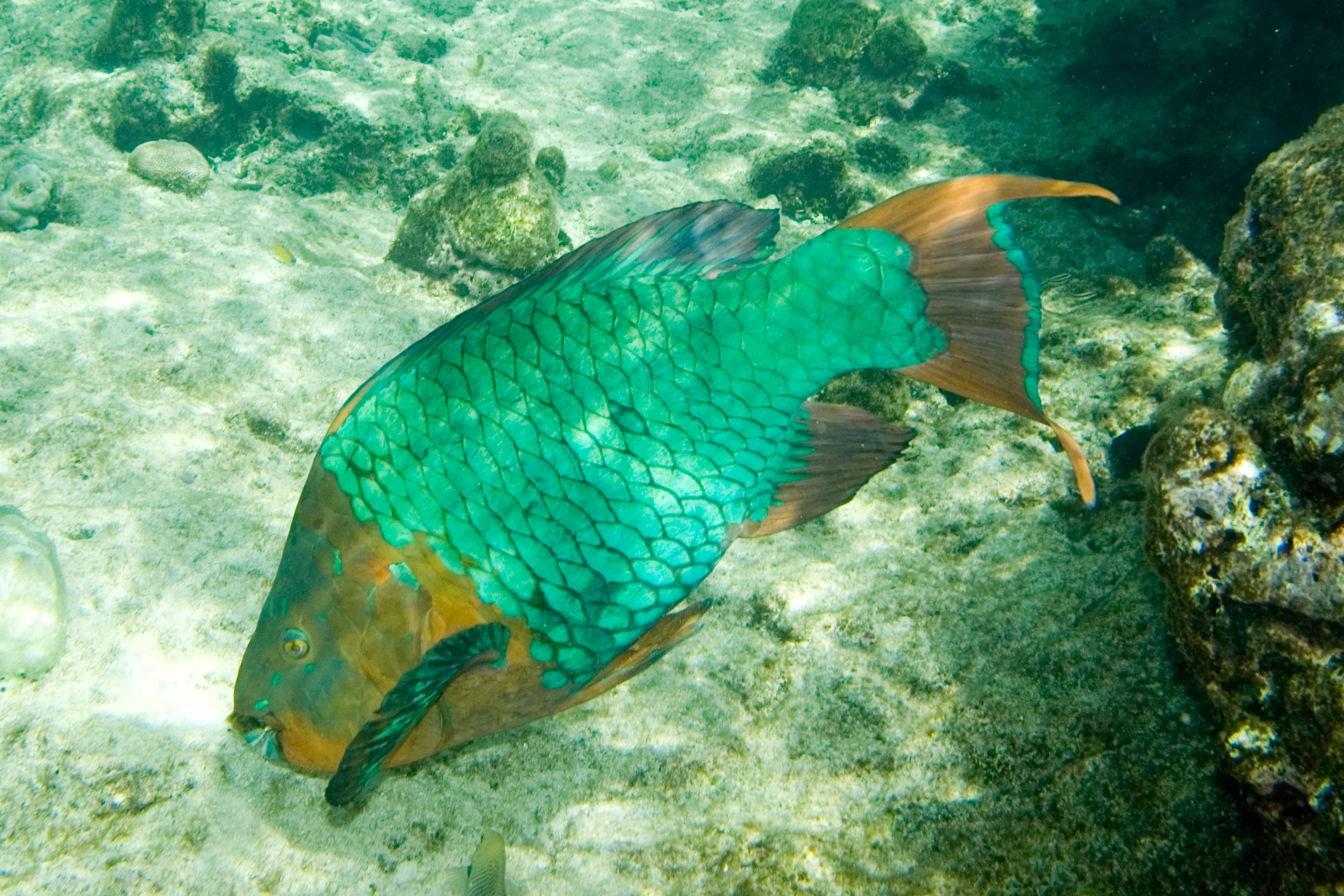
In Bonaire
