= Denis Burgarella =

French astrophysicist

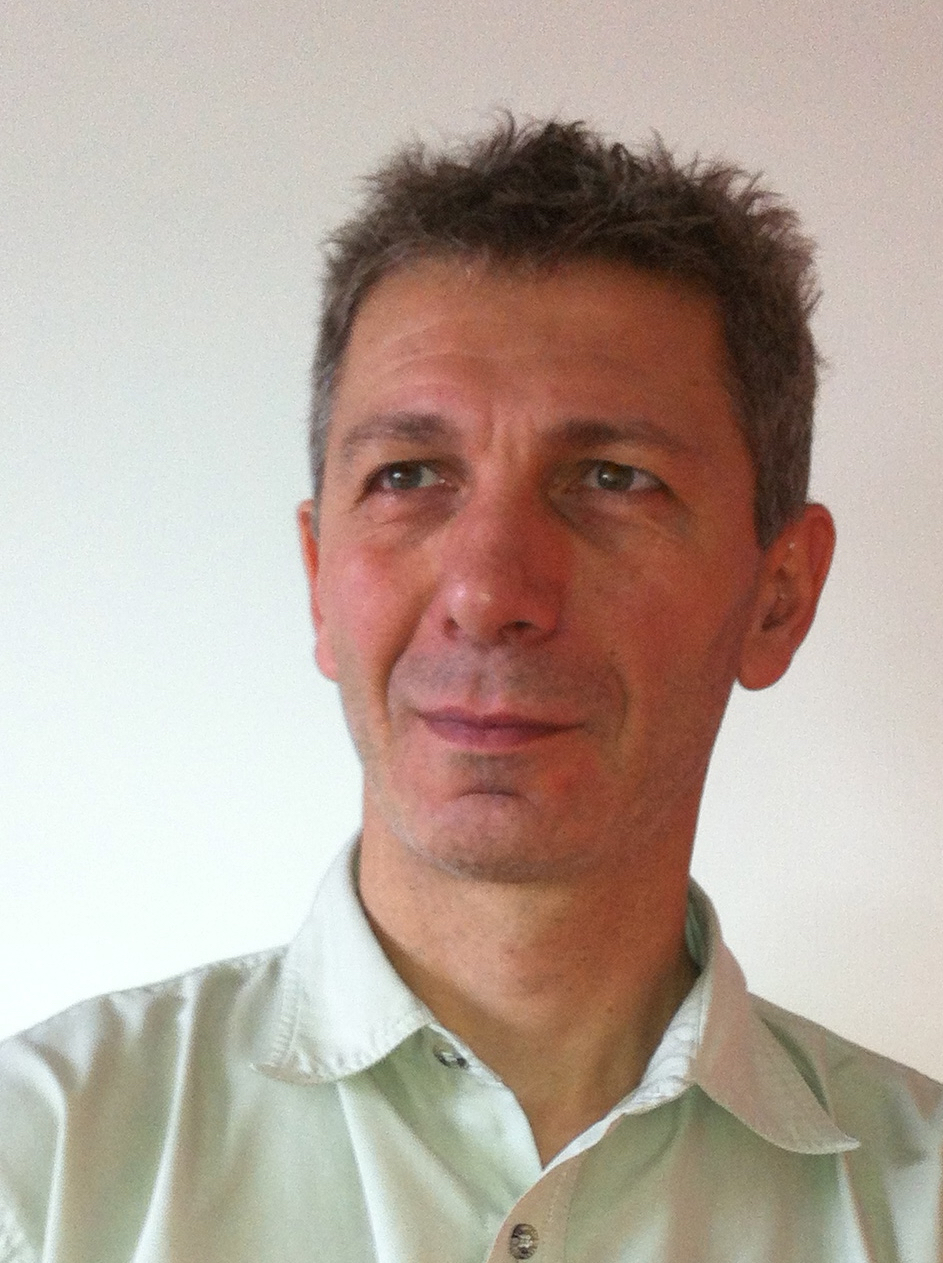
- Denis Burgarella
- Born: 8 May 1960 (age 66); Marseille, France
- Education: Aix-Marseille University; University of Nice
- Known for: Galaxy evolution; galaxy spectral energy distribution modelling; CIGALE
- Scientific career
- Fields: Astrophysics
- Workplaces: Aix-Marseille University, Laboratoire d'astrophysique de Marseille

Denis Burgarella (born 8 May 1960) is a French astrophysicist and astronomer at the Laboratoire d'astrophysique de Marseille (LAM), associated with Aix-Marseille University. His research focuses on galaxy formation and evolution, cosmic dust, star formation, and the modelling of galaxy spectral energy distributions.

== Education and career ==
Burgarella was born in Marseille on 8 May 1960. He studied physics at Aix-Marseille University and received a doctorate from the University of Nice in 1987.

He subsequently held a postdoctoral position at the Space Telescope Science Institute (STScI) in Baltimore under an ESA contract. During this period, his research included studies of globular clusters using observations from the Hubble Space Telescope.

In the early 1990s, Burgarella increasingly shifted his research toward the formation and evolution of galaxies. He has held a permanent astronomical research position at the Laboratoire d'Astrophysique de Marseille since 1992.

== Research ==
Burgarella's research concerns the formation and evolution of galaxies across cosmic time. His work uses multi-wavelength observations, including ultraviolet, optical and infrared data, to study stellar populations, star formation and dust in galaxies.

He has contributed to the development of CIGALE (Code Investigating GALaxy Emission), a software package used to model galaxy spectral energy distributions and derive physical properties from multi-wavelength observations. The modern Python implementation models emission from the far-ultraviolet to the radio and can be used to estimate quantities such as stellar mass, star-formation rate, dust attenuation and dust luminosity. Earlier work by Burgarella, Buat and Iglesias-Páramo provided part of the methodological basis for the later CIGALE framework.

Burgarella has also studied dust formation and evolution in high-redshift galaxies. In a 2020 paper with Ambra Nanni and collaborators, he investigated observational and theoretical constraints on the formation and early evolution of dust grains in galaxies at redshifts 5 < z < 10.

He remains involved in the development of CIGALE. A spectro-photometric version released in 2025 added simultaneous analysis of spectroscopic and photometric data and new line-emission models.

== Scientific organizations ==
Burgarella served as president of the Société Française d'Astronomie et d'Astrophysique from 2008 to 2010.

Within the International Astronomical Union (IAU), he served as president of the Inter-Division Commission on Galaxy Spectral Energy Distributions from 2015 to 2018, president of Division J, Galaxies and Cosmology, from 2018 to 2021, and president of Commission J3, Galaxies at the Epoch of Reionisation, from 2021 to 2024.

== Selected publications ==
- Burgarella, D.; Buat, V.; Iglesias-Páramo, J. (2005). "Star formation and dust attenuation properties in galaxies from a statistical ultraviolet-to-far-infrared analysis". Monthly Notices of the Royal Astronomical Society.
- Noll, S.; Burgarella, D.; Giovannoli, E.; Buat, V.; Marcillac, D.; Muñoz-Mateos, J.-C. (2009). "Analysis of galaxy spectral energy distributions from far-UV to far-IR with CIGALE: studying a SINGS test sample". Astronomy & Astrophysics.
- Boquien, M.; Burgarella, D.; Roehlly, Y.; et al. (2019). "CIGALE: a python Code Investigating GALaxy Emission". Astronomy & Astrophysics. 622: A103. doi:10.1051/0004-6361/201834156.
- Burgarella, D.; Nanni, A.; Hirashita, H.; et al. (2020). "Observational and theoretical constraints on the formation and early evolution of the first dust grains in galaxies at 5 < z < 10". Astronomy & Astrophysics. 637: A32. doi:10.1051/0004-6361/201937143.
