= Sylvie Vauclair =

French astrophysicist and teacher (born 1946)

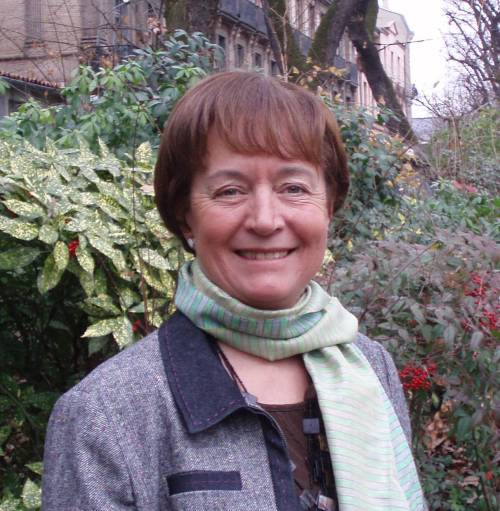
- Born: Sylvie Denise Juliette Gueudet; March 7, 1946 (age 79); Saint-Germain-en-Laye, France
- Occupations: Astrophysicist; professor
- Title: president, Société Française d'Astronomie et d'Astrophysique
- Awards: Officer, Ordre national du Mérite; Officer, Ordre des Palmes académiques; Knight, Legion of Honour
- Scientific career
- Institutions: Institut de Recherche en Astrophysique et Planétologie; Toulouse III - Paul Sabatier University; Paris Diderot University
- Thesis: Diffusion et abondance des éléments légers dans les étoiles (1975)
- Doctoral advisors: Hubert Reeves; Evry Schatzman
- Website: http://sylvievauclair.com/

Sylvie Vauclair (born on March 7, 1946, in Saint-Germain-en-Laye) is a French astrophysicist (at the Institut de Recherche en Astrophysique et Planétologie), and professor emeritus (at the Toulouse III - Paul Sabatier University), where she taught for more than 30 years. She also taught for a decade at the Paris Diderot University. She has served as president of the Société Française d'Astronomie et d'Astrophysique.

== Biography ==
After two theses under the direction of Hubert Reeves and then Evry Schatzman, her scientific work first focused on the formation and evolution of the chemical elements that make up matter in the universe: sun, stars, primordial universe. She particularly studied the importance of the selective diffusion of atoms in stellar conditions and its consequences for their structure and evolution. She has shown the repercussions of these processes on the evolution of matter in the Universe since the Big Bang.

She has made important contributions to helioseismology and asteroseismology by studying the influence of the detailed internal chemical composition on the observed frequencies. In particular, she studied the vibrations of several central stars of planetary systems to determine their precise parameters. In 2004, she participated in the discovery of the smallest known planet around the star Mu Arae. She is responsible for the discovery that the star Iota Horologii in the middle of the Hyades star cluster, observed in the Southern Hemisphere.

An international symposium was held in her honor in 2013, on the topic of interactions between microscopic (atomic) and macroscopic (hydrodynamic) phenomena occurring in stars. This is a subject to which she has contributed a lot during her career, with the aim of better understanding the structure and evolution of stars.

Vauclair is also a musician. She is interested in the relationship between philosophy, art and science and participates in many transdisciplinary events and in social debates.

== Awards and honours ==
- 1995: Member, Académie de l'air et de l'espace
- 1999: Cercle d'Oc Prize
- 2000: Member, Academia Europaea
- 2002: Scientific book prize, Orsay
- 2002: Senior member, Institut Universitaire de France
- 2008: Prize, Academy of Occitania
- 2009: Grand prize, friends of the Cité de l'espace

=== Distinctions ===
- 1994: Knight, Ordre des Palmes académiques
- 2007: Officer, Ordre des Palmes académiques
- 2009: Knight, Legion of Honour
- 2015: Officer, Ordre national du Mérite

== Selected works ==
- La nouvelle symphonie des étoiles, l'humanité face au cosmos, Odile Jacob, 2021 ISBN 9782738149886
- De l'origine de l'Univers à l'origine de la vie, Odile Jacob, 2017 ISBN 2738136206
- Dialogues avec l'Univers, Odile Jacob, 2015 ISBN 9782738132833
- La nouvelle musique des sphères, Odile Jacob, 2013 ISBN 9782738130365
- La Terre, l'espace et au-delà, Albin Michel, 2009 ISBN 2226187111
- La naissance des éléments : du Big-Bang à la Terre, Odile Jacob, 2006 ISBN 2738118615
- La chanson du Soleil , Albin Michel, coll. « Sciences d'aujourd'hui », 2002 ISBN 2226133313
- La symphonie des étoiles , Albin Michel, coll. « Sciences d'aujourd'hui », 1997 ISBN 222609525X
- L'observatoire du Pic du Midi de Bigorre, Loubatières, 1992 ISBN 2862661694
- L'astrophysique nucléaire, PUF, coll. « Que sais-je? », 1972 ISBN 9782130533009

=== Textbooks ===
- Éléments de physique statistique, hasard, organisation, évolution, Inter-Éditions, 1993 ISBN 2729604855
- An Introduction to Nuclear Astrophysics, Reidel, 1979 ISBN 9027710120

== See also ==
- Meanings of minor-planet names: 352001–353000: 352333 Sylvievauclair (asteroid)
