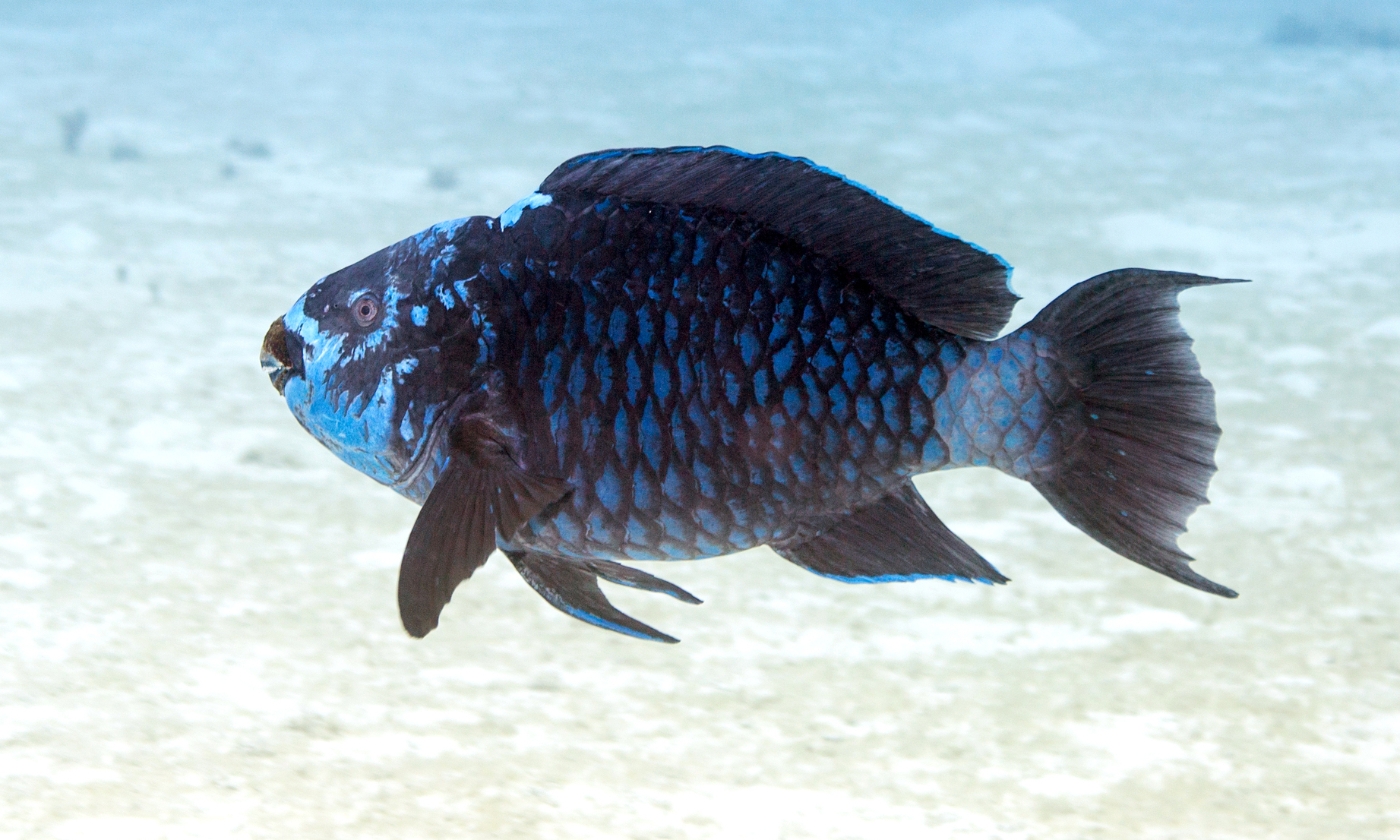
- In the Bahamas

Conservation status
- Data Deficient (IUCN 3.1)

Scientific classification
- Kingdom: Animalia
- Phylum: Chordata
- Class: Actinopterygii
- Order: Labriformes
- Family: Labridae
- Genus: Scarus
- Species: S. coelestinus

Binomial name
- Scarus coelestinus Valenciennes, 1840

Synonyms
- Scarus rostratus Poey, 1860; Pseudoscarus simplex Poey, 1865; Pseudoscarus plumbeus Bean, 1912

= Midnight parrotfish =

Species of fish

The midnight parrotfish (Scarus coelestinus) is a species of parrotfish that inhabits coral reefs mainly in the Caribbean, Bahamas, and Florida.

The typical size is between 30 and 60 cm, but it can grow to almost 1 m. It has been observed as far north as Maryland and as far south as Brazil. Usually found between 3 and 80 m deep, it swims over reefs and sandy areas, where it feeds on algae by scraping it with its teeth fused into a beak.

== Description ==
The midnight parrotfish has a deep blue body with light blue patches along its sides and head. The exact location of light blue patches differs between each fish, but all midnight parrotfish have a light blue patch on the underside of the beak.

Unlike most other parrotfish species, the midnight parrotfish retains its coloration through its juvenile and adult stages of life. Both male and female midnight parrotfish exhibit this coloration.

Parrotfishes gain their name from the hard beak that they use to scrape food from hard substrates.

The midnight parrotfish is most closely related to two other large-bodied parrotfish species, S. guacamaia and S. trispinosus.

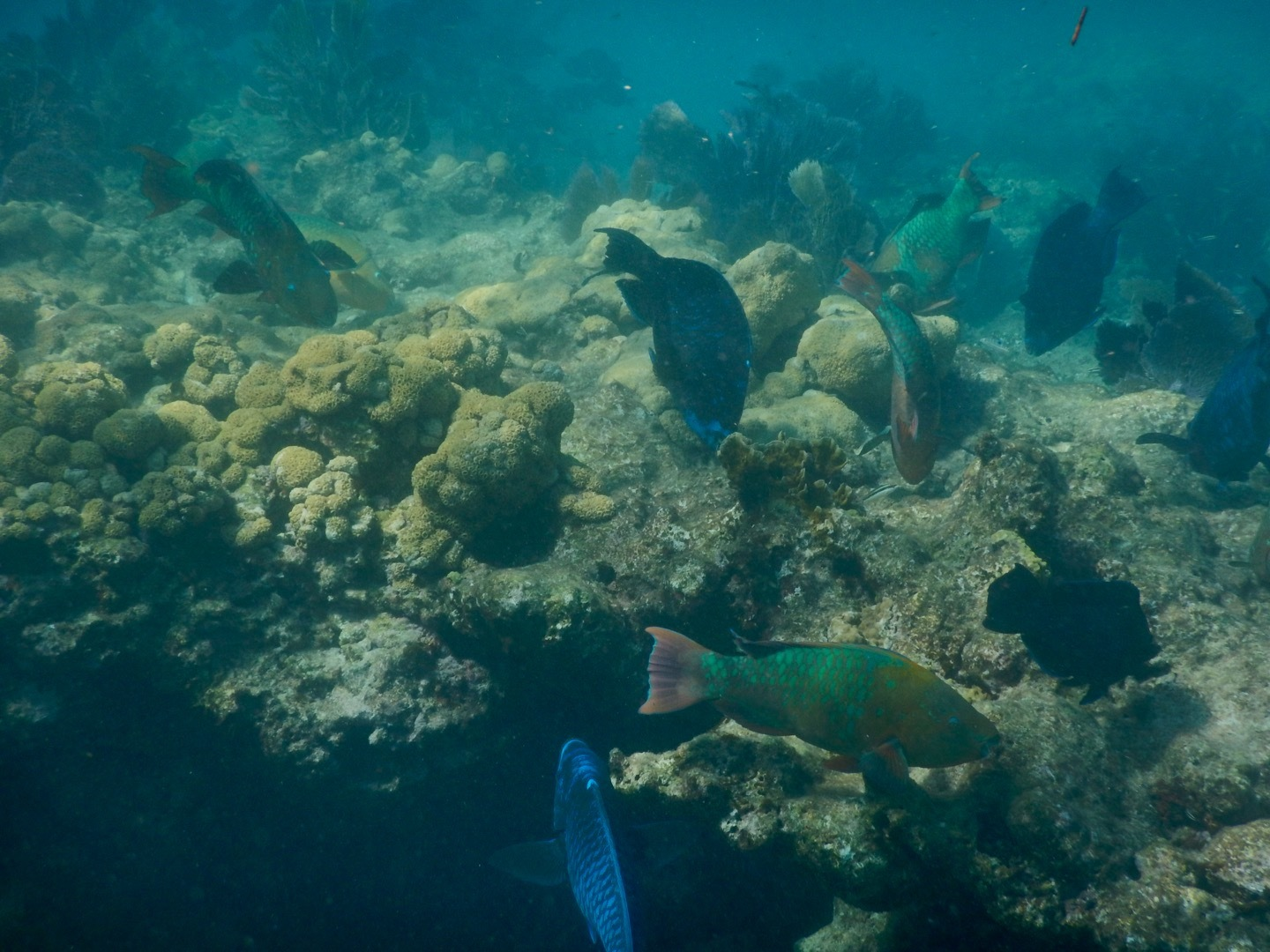
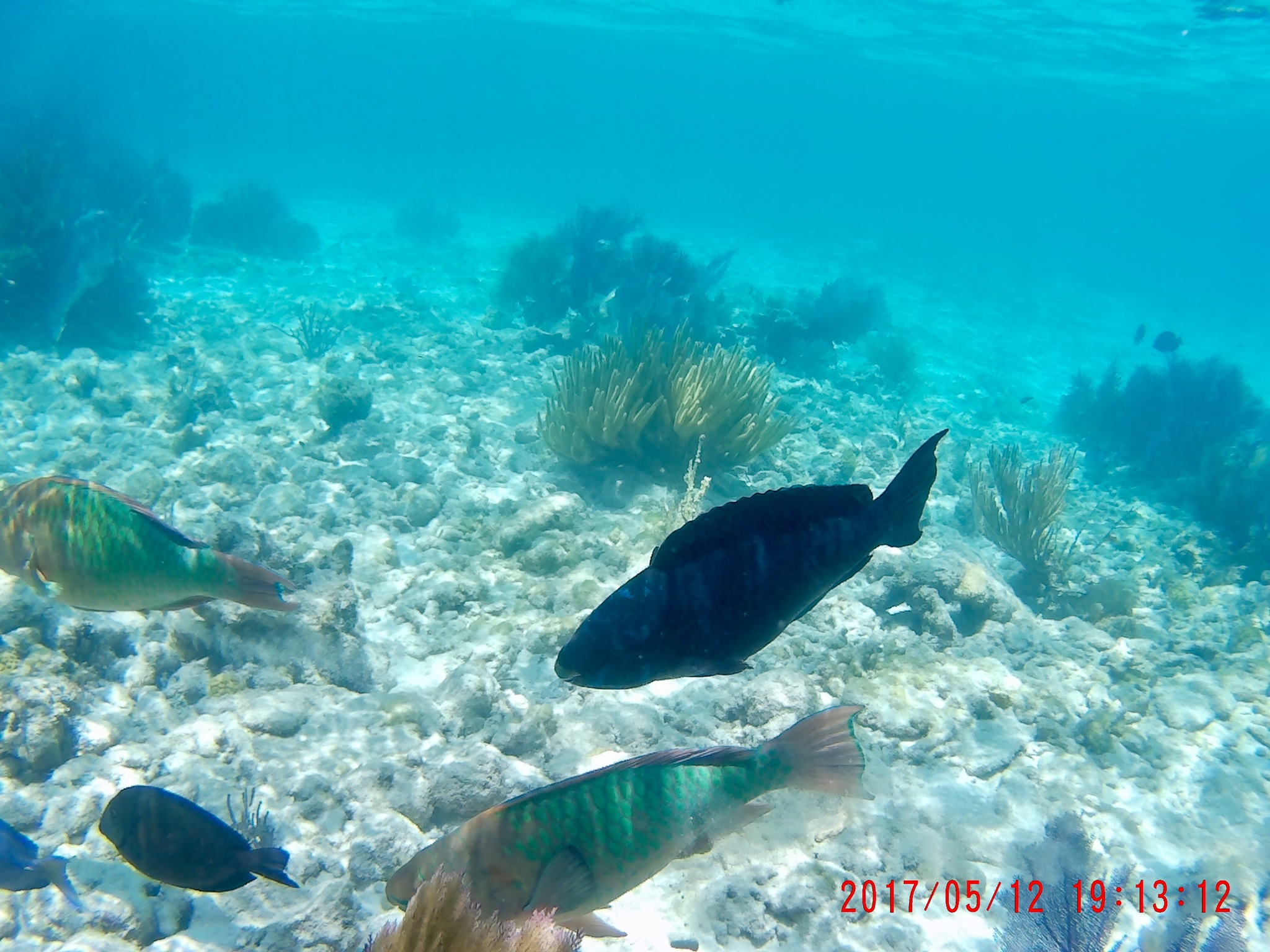
S. coelestinus with S. guacamaia in Florida, two extremely closely related species. Unlike most Scarus species, these two are not sexually dimorphic. Due to their similar appearance and sympatric distribution, they were often thought to be colour phases of the same species until the 1960s.

== Habitat ==
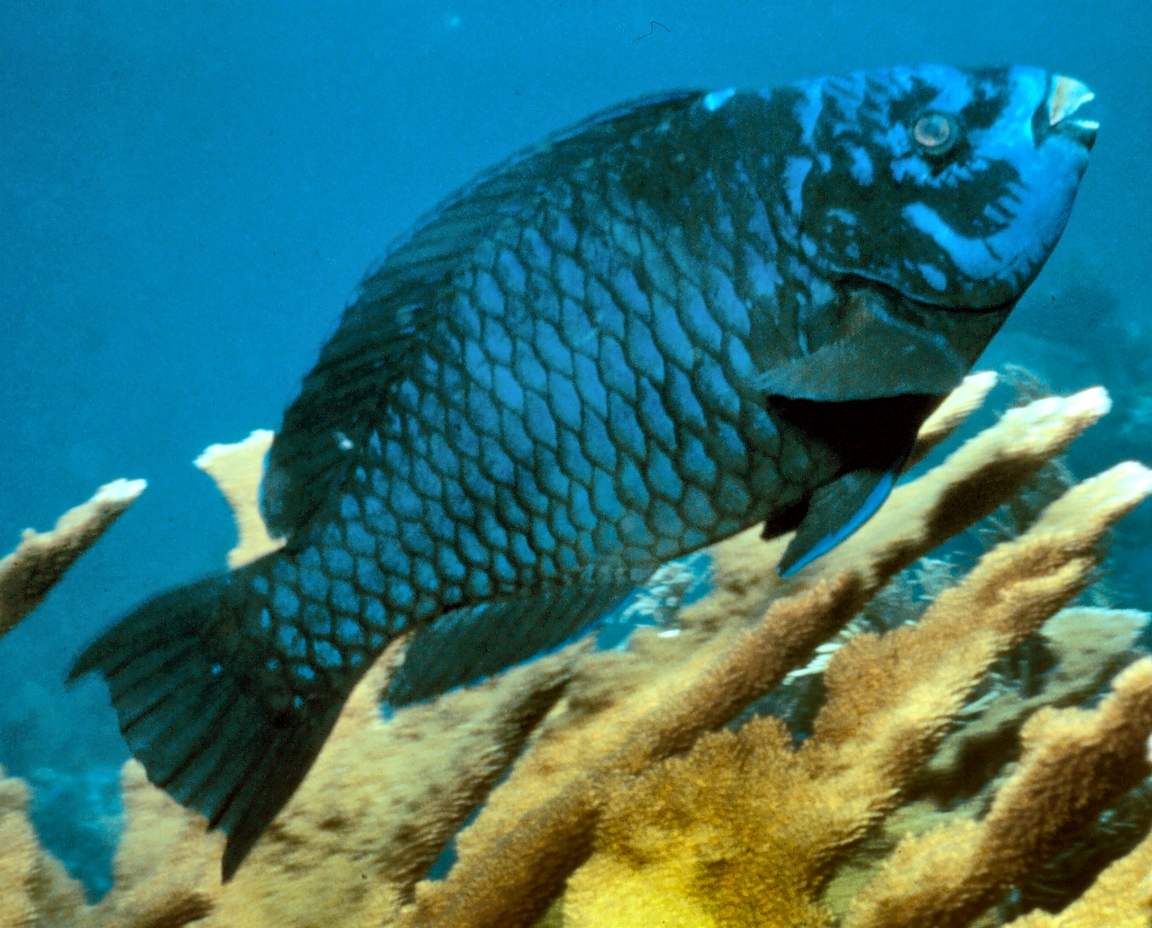
In Florida

The midnight parrotfish inhabits coral reefs mainly in the Caribbean, southern Florida, and the southern Gulf of Mexico, but has been found as far north as Maryland and as far south as Brazil.

Midnight parrotfish were found to be the only species of 32 Caribbean reef fishes to not have a significant zonation among patch or crest reefs. While less abundant than other parrotfish species such as the queen parrotfish (Scarus vetula), striped parrotfish (Scarus iseri), stoplight parrotfish (Sparisoma viride), and redband parrotfish (Sparisoma aurofrenatum), the midnight parrotfish is an important part of the trophic web. Like other parrotfish, the midnight parrotfish controls algal populations through feeding, and encourages coral growth through its grazing.

Midnight parrotfish have been found at depths between 5 and 75 meters.

== Feeding ==
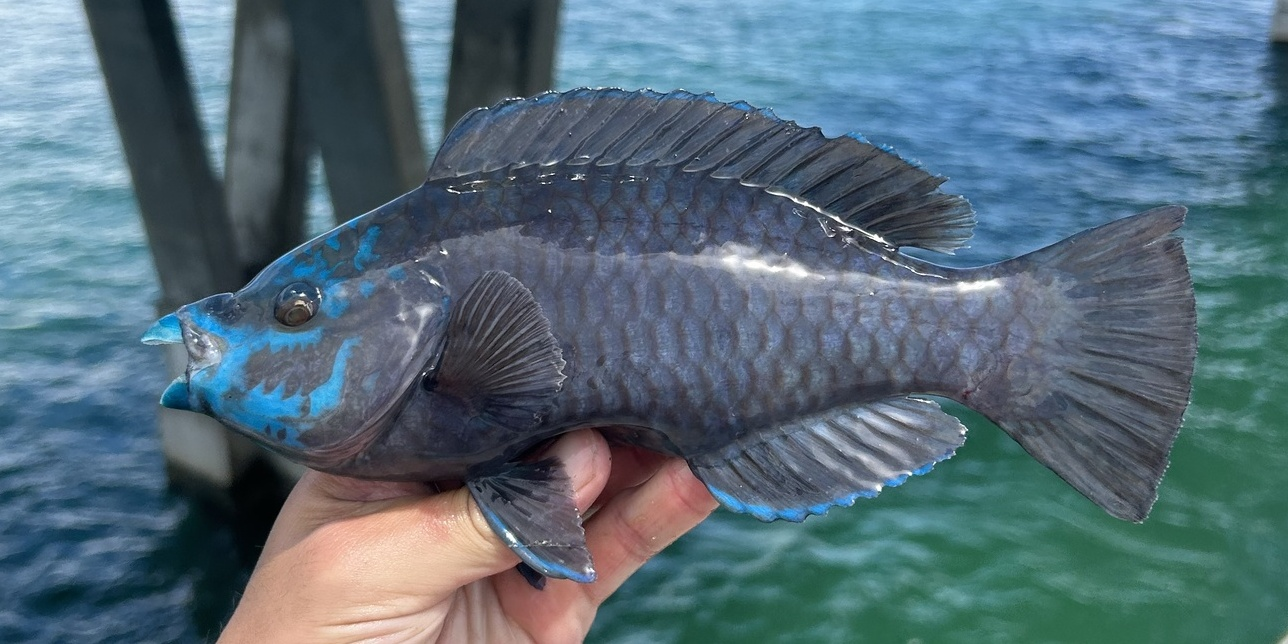
Small specimen showing fully extended fins, in Florida

The midnight parrotfish, along with other parrotfishes, is primarily a herbivore. Their main source of food is algae, which they scrape from coral and other hard substrates using their beak. Through this process, the parrotfish also consumes carbonate sediments and assists in moving sediment around the reef. The midnight parrotfish can take up to 16,000 bites a day as an adult, and 28,000 a day as a juvenile. In addition to herbivory, midnight parrotfish have also been observed consuming sergeant major damselfish eggs. Unlike other species of parrotfish that live in mangrove forests, the midnight parrotfish has not been shown to consume sponges.

== Behaviour ==
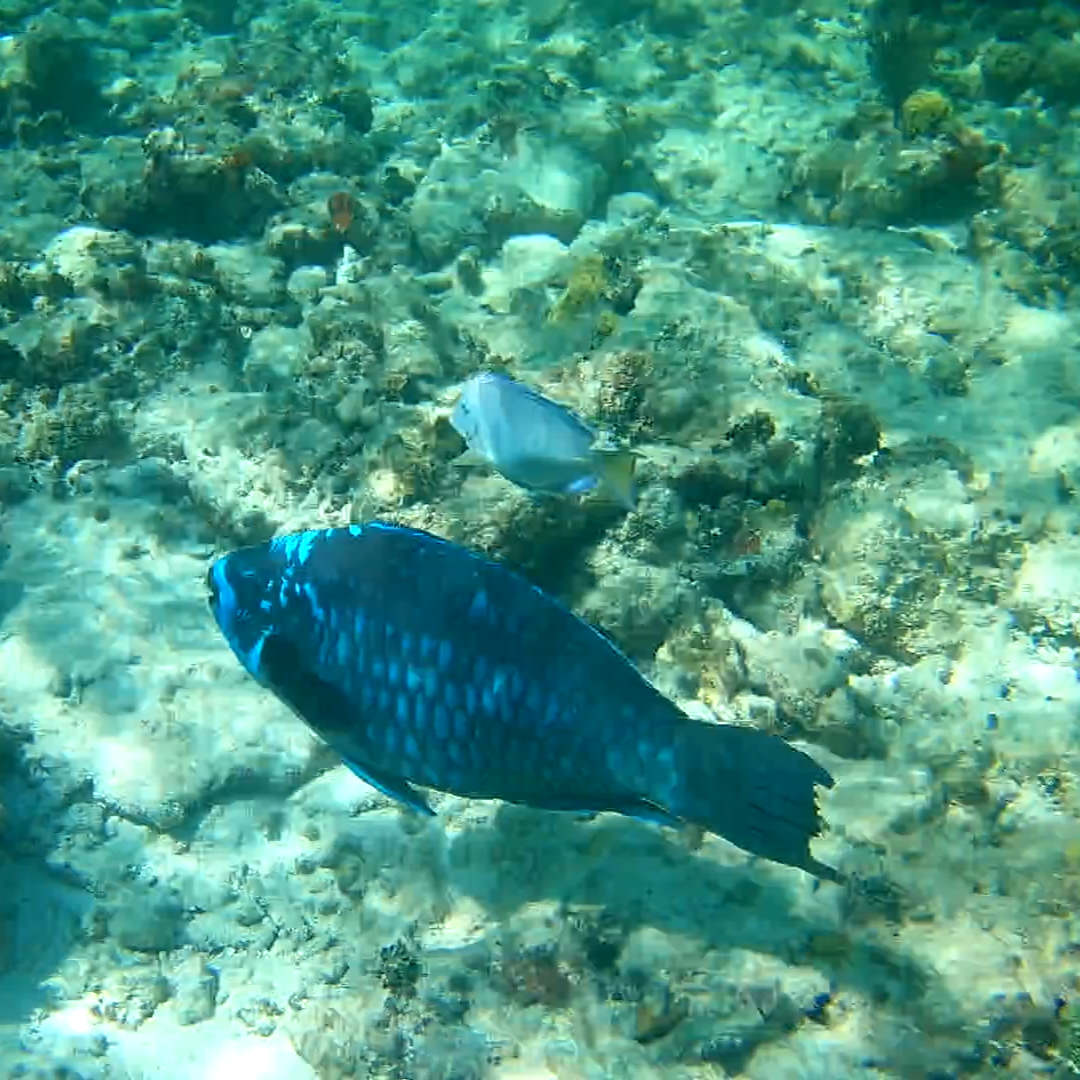
With a blue tang, in Florida

As is the case with other large-bodied parrotfish species, midnight parrotfish are relatively rare throughout their range. However, in areas where they are not fished for, they can be locally abundant; in such areas, feeding midnight parrotfish may form schools of over 30 individuals in order to raid food from the algae "farms" and egg nests of territorial damselfish (e.g., sergeant majors and Stegastes), overwhelming the damselfish's defences with their sheer numbers. Bite scars found on sergeant major damselfish nests indicate this behaviour is common.

Midnight parrotfish are often found schooling with large numbers of blue tang for extended period of time when feeding. These mixed schools feed together on algae, and are typically composed of 50 to 400 blue tang with 1-7 midnight parrotfish, although mixed schools where over a third of the individuals are midnight parrotfish have also been recorded. There are several hypothesized advantages to this mixed schooling behaviour. It may camouflage midnight parrotfish against the blue tang school, as both species are similar in colouration, protecting the former from predators. Blue tang are also armed with sharp tail spines, which in this context may further deter predators from the parrotfish. Mixed schooling may also increase the parrotfish's access to food sources, as large groups of blue tang are able to access algae from damselfish territories that are otherwise too heavily defended by the damselfish for the parrotfish to feed from.

== Conservation and protection ==
Midnight parrotfish are cited as 'Least Concern' on the IUCN Red List. This is due to the high concentrations of midnight parrotfish in the Gulf of Mexico and Caribbean. Midnight parrotfish are protected species in United States waters, as well as a number of marine protected areas in the Caribbean. However, Cuban spear-fishers often target the midnight parrotfish along with other parrotfish species, which has led to a slight decline in population.
