= Hubert Reeves =

French-Canadian astrophysicist (1932–2023)

Hubert Reeves CC GOQ
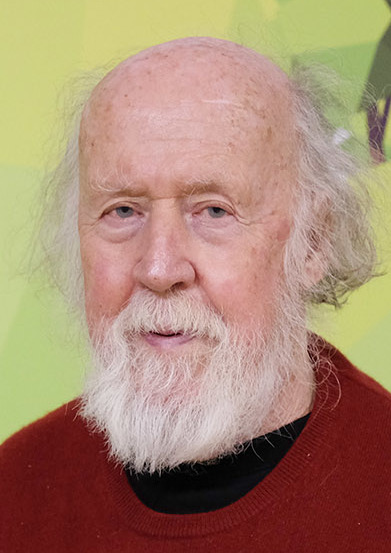
- Reeves in 2015
- Born: July 13, 1932; Montreal, Quebec, Canada
- Died: October 13, 2023 (aged 91); Paris, France
- Citizenship: Canadian; French
- Education: Collège Jean-de-Brébeuf; Université de Montréal; McGill University; Cornell University
- Known for: Works on stellar nucleo-synthesis Popularisation of science
- Spouse(s): Francine Brunel-Reeves (first wife); Camille Scoffier-Reeves (second wife)
- Children: 4
- Awards: See Honours and Recognition
- Scientific career
- Fields: Astrophysics
- Workplaces: CNRS
- Thesis: Thermonuclear Reaction Involving Medium Light Nuclei (1960)
- Doctoral advisor: Edwin Salpeter
- Doctoral students: Jean Audouze; Sylvie Vauclair
- Website: www.hubertreeves.info

Hubert Reeves CC GOQ (July 13, 1932 – October 13, 2023) was a French-Canadian astrophysicist and popularizer of science.

== Early life and education ==
Reeves was born in Montreal on July 13, 1932, and as a child lived in Léry. Reeves attended Collège Jean-de-Brébeuf, a prestigious French-language college in Montreal. He obtained a BSc degree in physics from the Université de Montréal in 1953, an MSc degree from McGill University in 1956 with a thesis entitled "Formation of Positronium in Hydrogen and Helium" and a PhD degree at Cornell University in 1960.

== Career ==
From 1960 to 1964, he taught physics at the Université de Montréal and worked as an adviser to NASA. He became a Director of Research at the French National Centre for Scientific Research (CNRS) in 1965.

== Personal life and death ==
Reeves often spoke on television, promoting science. He was married to Francine Brunel-Reeves and they had four children together. He resided in Paris, France, where he died on October 13, 2023, at the age of 91.

== Honours and recognition ==
- In 1976, he was made Knight of the Ordre national du Mérite (France).
- In 1986, he was made Knight of the Légion d'Honneur (France). He was promoted to Officer in 1994 and to Commander in 2003.
- In 1991, he was made an Officer of the Order of Canada and was promoted to Companion in 2003.
- In 1994, he was made Officer of the National Order of Quebec. He was promoted to Grand Officer in 2017.
- Asteroid 9631 Hubertreeves is named after Reeves: see Meanings of asteroid names (9501-10000).
- In 2001, he received the Albert Einstein Medal for research on the density of the universe.
- In 2011, the Prix Hubert-Reeves was created.
- In 2019, he received the Prix Jules Janssen, the highest award of the Société astronomique de France.

== Selected publications ==
- Reeves, Hubert (1998). Origins: Speculations on the Cosmos, Earth and Mankind (1st English-language ed.). London: Arcade Publishing. pp. 192pp. ISBN 1-55970-408-X.
- Reeves, Hubert (July 1971). Nuclear Reactions in Stellar Surfaces and Their Relations with Stellar Evolution. London: Gordon and Breach. pp. 88pp. ISBN 0-677-02960-8.
- Reeves, Hubert (1968). Stellar evolution and nucleosynthesis. New York: Gordon and Breach. ISBN 0-677-30150-2.
- Reeves, Hubert (1981). Atoms of Silence: An Exploration of Cosmic Evolution. Paris: Seuil. p. 282. ISBN 2-02-010170-X.
- Reeves, Hubert (1986). L'heure de s'enivrer : l'univers a-t-il un sens?. Seuil. ISBN 2-02-014400-X.
- Reeves, Hubert (1994). Dernières nouvelles du cosmos. Seuil. ISBN 2-02-022831-9.
- Reeves, Hubert; Lenoir, Frédéric (2003). Mal de Terre. Paris: Points. p. 272. ISBN 2-02-079064-5.
- Reeves, Hubert (2005). Chroniques du ciel et de la vie. Éditions du Seuil. ISBN 2-02-080030-6.
- Reeves, Hubert (2007). Chroniques des atomes et des galaxies. Éd. du Seuil. ISBN 978-2-7578-2297-5.
- Reeves, Hubert; Boutinot, Nelly; Casanave, Daniel; Champion, Claire (2017). Hubert Reeves nous explique la biodiversité. Bruxelles: Le Lombard. ISBN 9782803670796.
- Reeves, Hubert; Boutinot, Nelly; Casanave, Daniel; Champion, Claire (2018). Hubert Reeves nous explique la forêt. Bruxelles: Le Lombard. ISBN 9782803672325.
- Reeves, Hubert; Vandermeulen, David; Casanave, Daniel (2019). Hubert Reeves nous explique les océans. Bruxelles: Le Lombard. ISBN 9782803673100.
- Reeves, Hubert, Michel Cassé, Étienne Klein, Marc Lachièze-Rey, Roland Lehoucq, Jean-Pierre Luminet, Nathalie Palanque-Delabrouille, Nicolas Prantzos, and Sylvie Vauclair. (2019). Petite histoire de la matière et de l'univers.
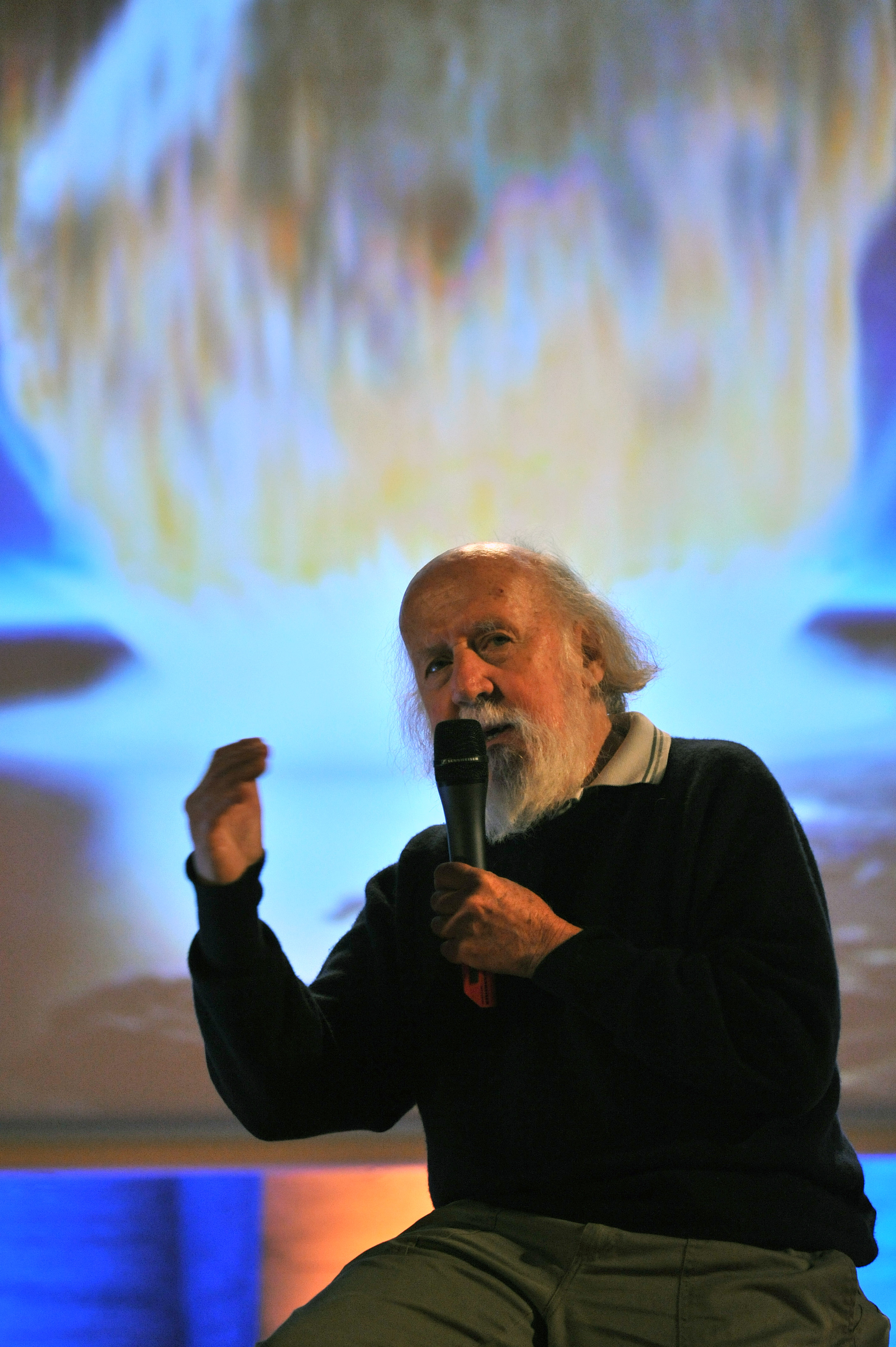
Conference on the decline of biodiversity, UNESCO Headquarters, Paris in 2009

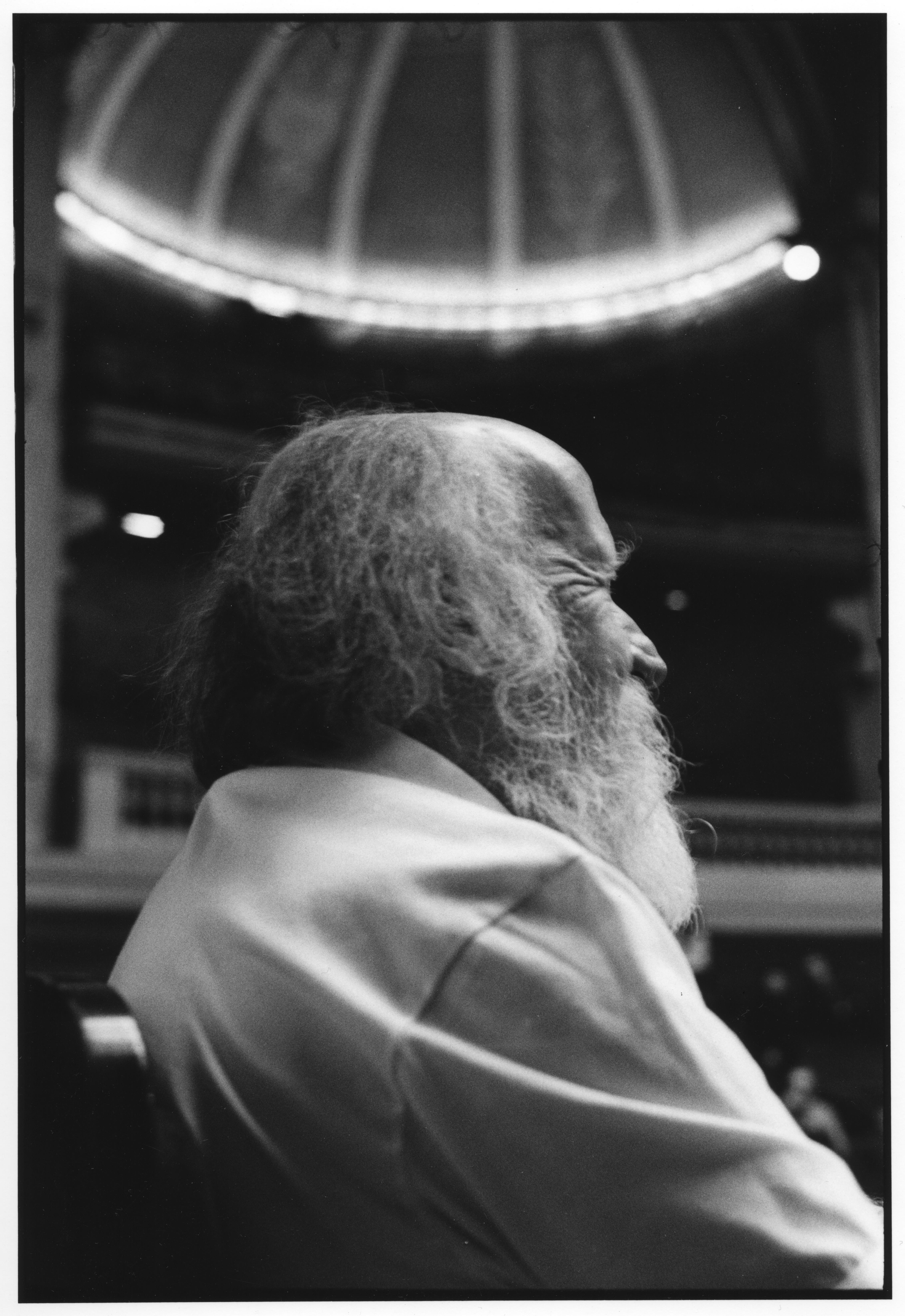
Hubert Reeves in La Sorbonne (Paris, France) photographed in 2001 by Olivier Meyer
