= Prix Hubert-Reeves =

The Prix Hubert-Reeves is a literary prize created in 2011 by the Association of Science Communicators of Quebec (in French Association des communicateurs scientifiques du Québec - ACS) honoring astrophysicist and French Canadian science communicator Hubert Reeves. This award recognizes Canadian author(s) of a popular science book written in French and published in Canada. The subject of the book may relate to pure or applied sciences, human sciences or technology. It may also relate to history or science ethics or aspect regarding social issues. Presented at the Annual Meeting of the ACS in Montreal, the Hubert Reeves award recognizes the literary quality and accuracy of the contents of the book, in addition to assessing the "potential influence on the enrichment of science culture in Canada".
