= Francine Brunel-Reeves =

Québécois singer, caller and researcher (1933–2018)

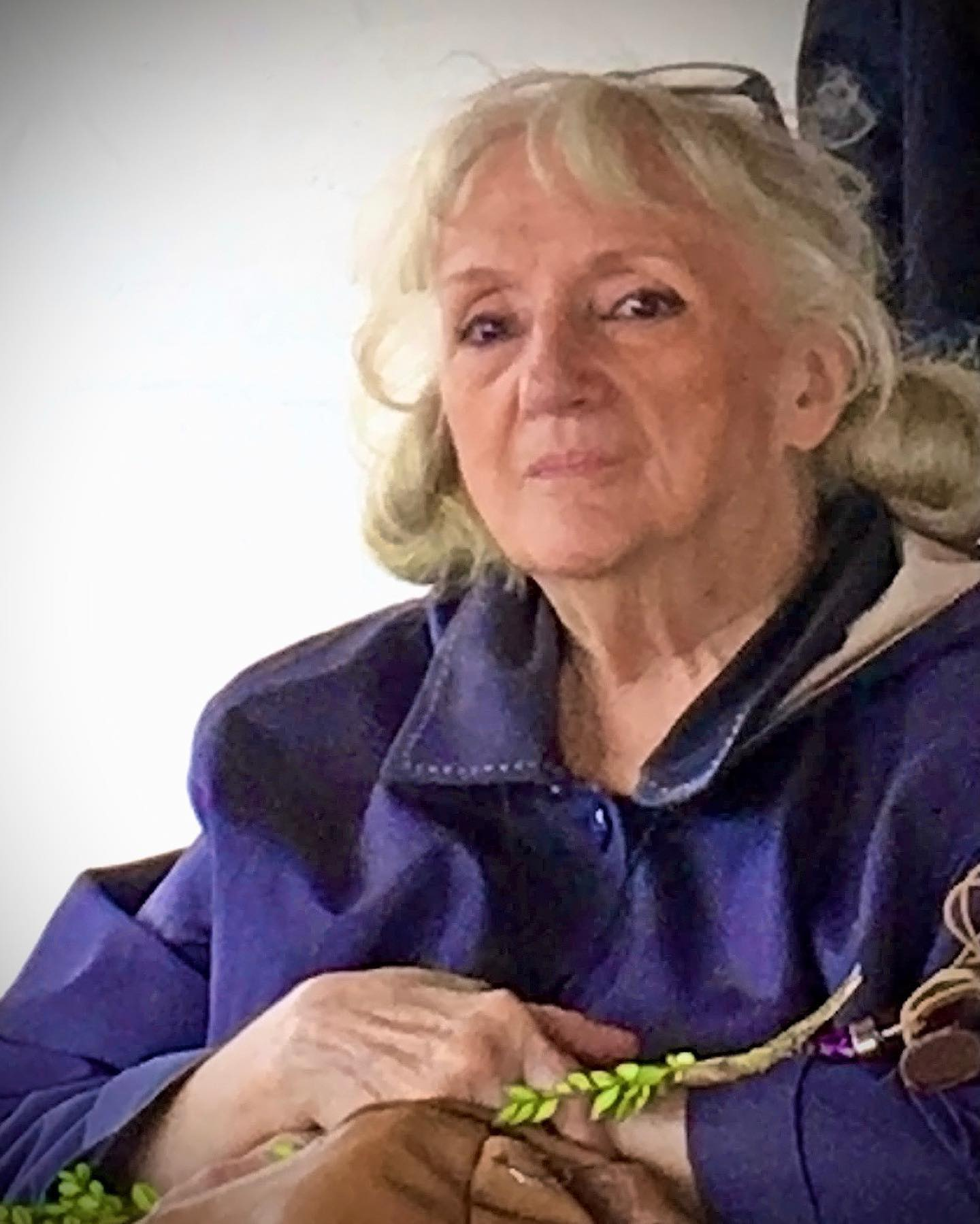
- Born: 29 October 1933; Montréal, Québec, Canada
- Died: 3 February 2018 (aged 84); Montréal, Québec, Canada
- Burial place: Cimetière Notre-Dame-des-Neiges
- Education: Collège Jésus-Marie; Université de Montréal; Sorbonne University
- Spouse: Hubert Reeves

Francine Brunel-Reeves (29 October 1933 – 3 February 2018) was a Québécois singer, caller, guitarist, dancer, ethnomusicologist and independent researcher of traditional music and dance in Quebec. She was known as the grandmother of French-Canadian traditional music.

== Biography ==
Brunel-Reeves was born on 29 October 1933 in Montréal, Québec, Canada, into a wealthy family. Her father was the biologist and botanist Jules Brunel [fr]. She was educated at a boarding school run by the Sisters of Saint Anne in Lachine, Québec; then attended a business course at the Collège Jésus-Marie in Montreal; then studied philosophy, history and law at the Université de Montréal.

Brunel-Reeves was a member of the Folklorists of Quebec dance troupe, under the direction of Simonne Voyer [fr].

Brunel-Reeves married the French-Canadian astrophysicist Hubert Reeves and they had four children together ( scientist and musician Benoît Reeves [fr]; architect Nicolas Reeves [fr]; Gilles Reeves and Evelyne Reeves) before they divorced. The couple moved to Europe for their careers, and she performed at the American Center in Paris, France, singing the songs of French-Canadian artists, such as Félix Leclerc, Gilles Vigneault and Claude Léveillée. She "became the first Quebecer to make traditional music known in France."

From 1984 and 1988, Brunel-Reeves studied ethnography at the Sorbonne University in Paris, France.

After returning to Canada, Brunel-Reeves performed at Québec balls as a "caller" and settled permanently in Quebec in 1991. She was a member of the Quebec Council for Living Heritage (CQPV) and the Society for the Promotion of Traditional Quebec Dance (SPDTQ).

Brunel-Reeves was the subject of the documentary As Long as There Remains a Voice (French: Tant qu'il reste une voix) made by Jean-Nicolas Orhon, which won the 2009 Mnémo Prize.

Brunel-Reeves died on 3 February 2018 in Montréal, aged 84. She was buried at Cimetière Notre-Dame-des-Neiges in Montréal.
