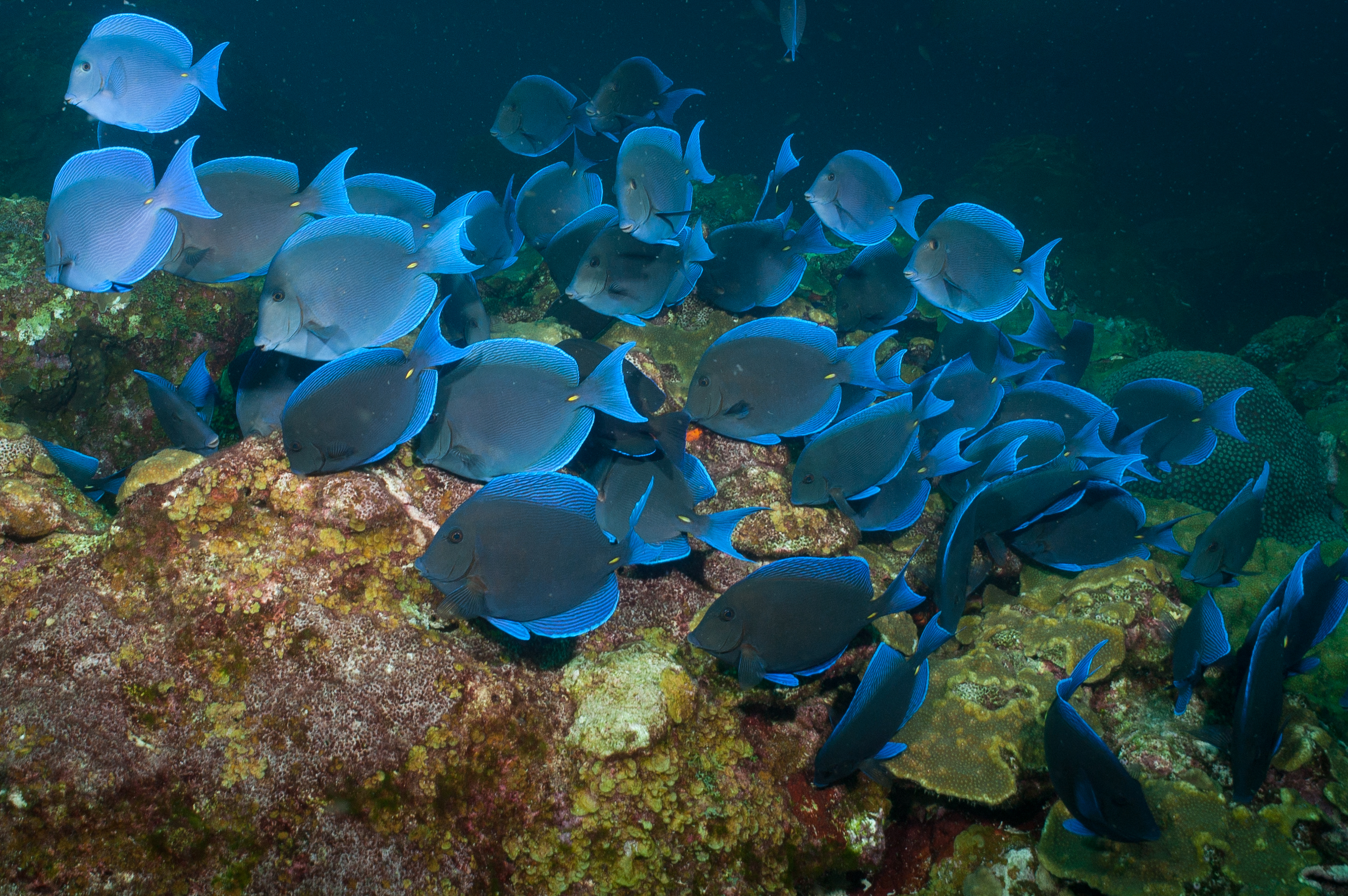
- In the Gulf of Mexico

Conservation status
- Least Concern (IUCN 3.1)

Scientific classification
- Kingdom: Animalia
- Phylum: Chordata
- Class: Actinopterygii
- Order: Acanthuriformes
- Family: Acanthuridae
- Genus: Acanthurus
- Species: A. coeruleus

Binomial name
- Acanthurus coeruleus Bloch & J. G. Schneider, 1801
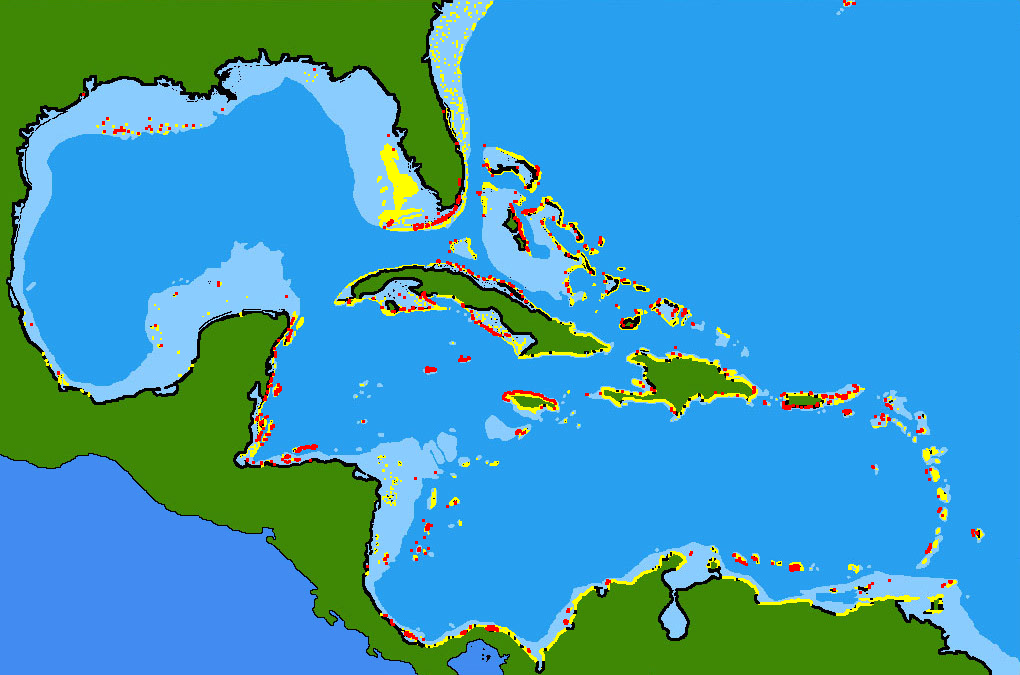

Synonyms
- List: Teuthis coeruleus (Bloch & Schneider, 1801); Acanthurus broussonnetii Desmarest, 1823; Acanthurus violaceus Castelnau, 1855; Acanthurus brevis Poey, 1860; Acronurus caeruleatus Poey, 1875; Teuthis helioides Barbour, 1905; Hepatus pawnee Breder, 1927

= Acanthurus coeruleus =

Species of fish

Acanthurus coeruleus is a species of marine ray-finned fish belonging to the family Acanthuridae, the surgeonfishes, unicornfishes and tangs, found in the Atlantic Ocean. It can grow up to 39 centimetres (15 in) long. Common names include Atlantic blue tang, blue barber, blue doctor, blue doctorfish, blue tang, blue tang surgeonfish, yellow barber, and yellow doctorfish.

== Distribution ==
Acanthurus coeruleus is present in the western Atlantic Ocean from New York to Florida, Mexico and Brazil, and Ascension Island in the Mid-Atlantic. Also found in the Mediterranean Sea since 2011.

== Description ==
Although the body of the reef fish can vary in shade from light to dark blue, the dorsal, anal and caudal fins are golden blue. As juveniles, the edges on their dorsal and anal fins and the rings around their eyes are purple-blue, blue or blue-green. Their colors change during growth from a yellow juvenile, yellow tailed blue subadult and the blue adult phase.

Acanthurus coeruleus exhibits biofluorescence, that is, when illuminated by blue or ultraviolet light, it re-emits it as green, and appears differently than under white light illumination (see image to the right). Biofluorescence may assist in intraspecific communication and camouflage.

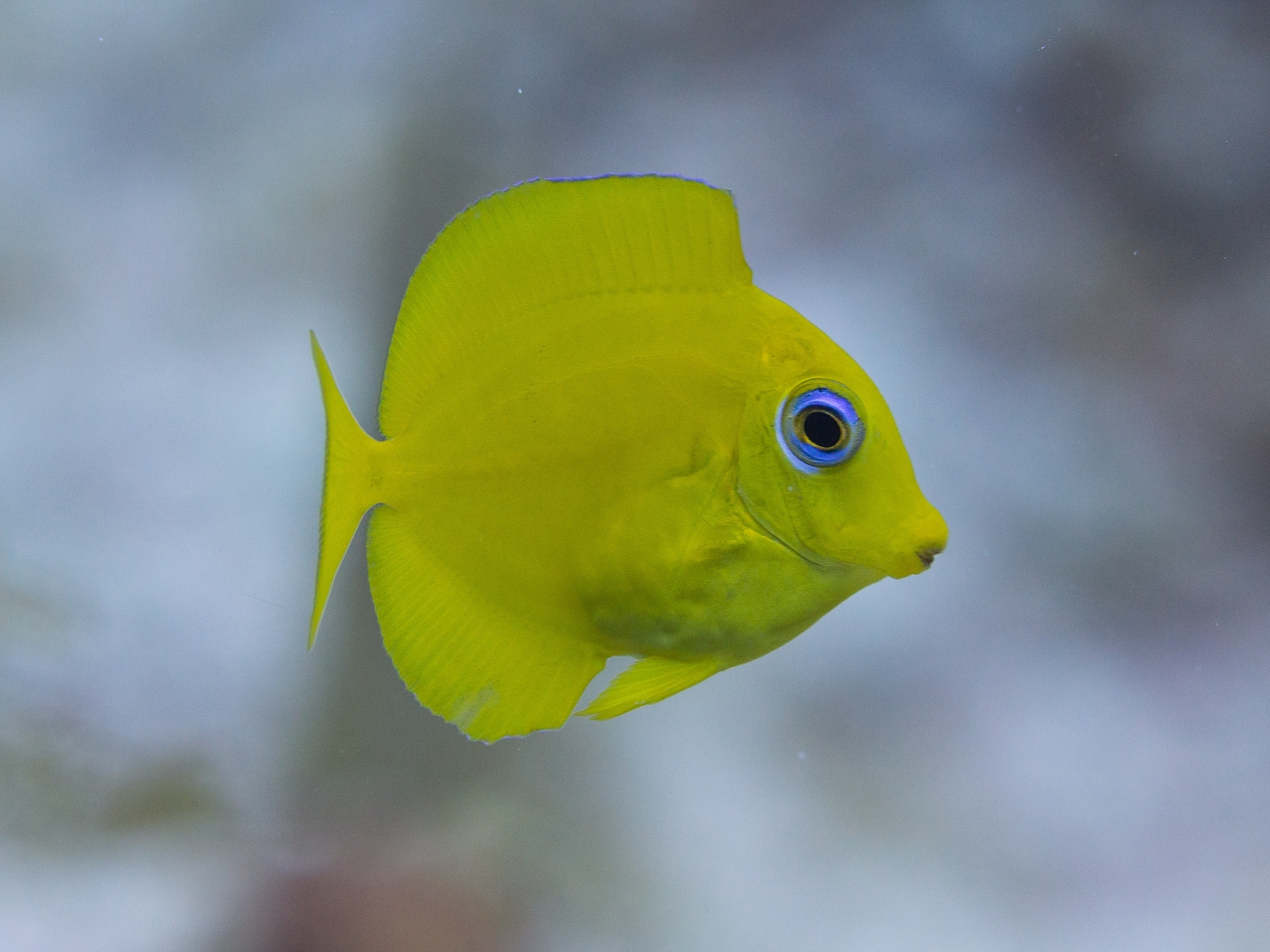
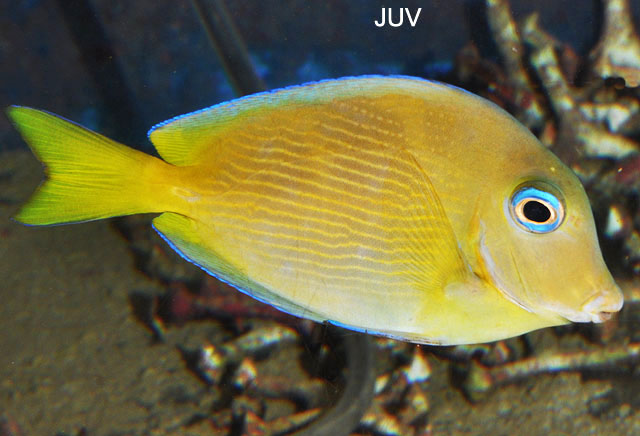
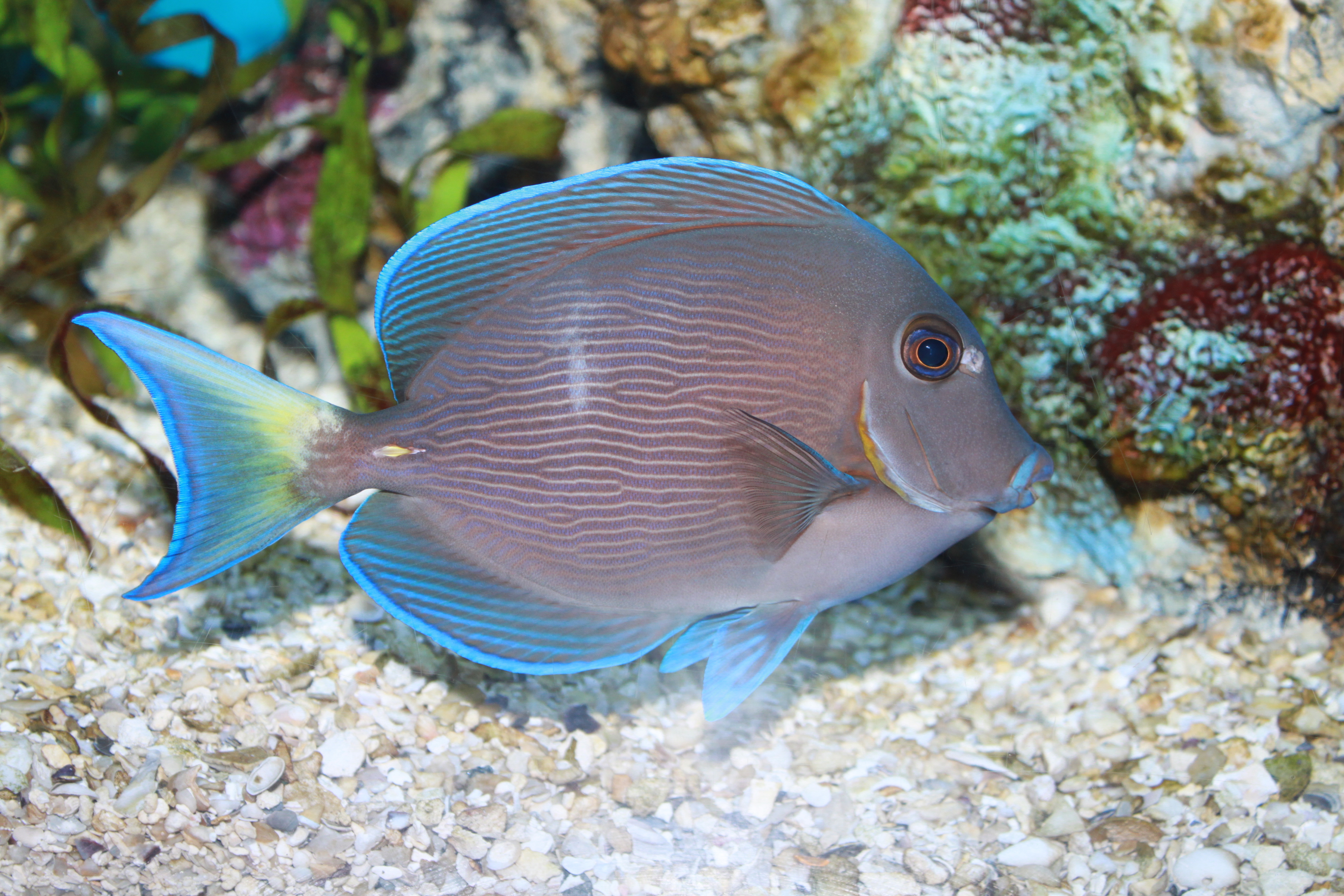
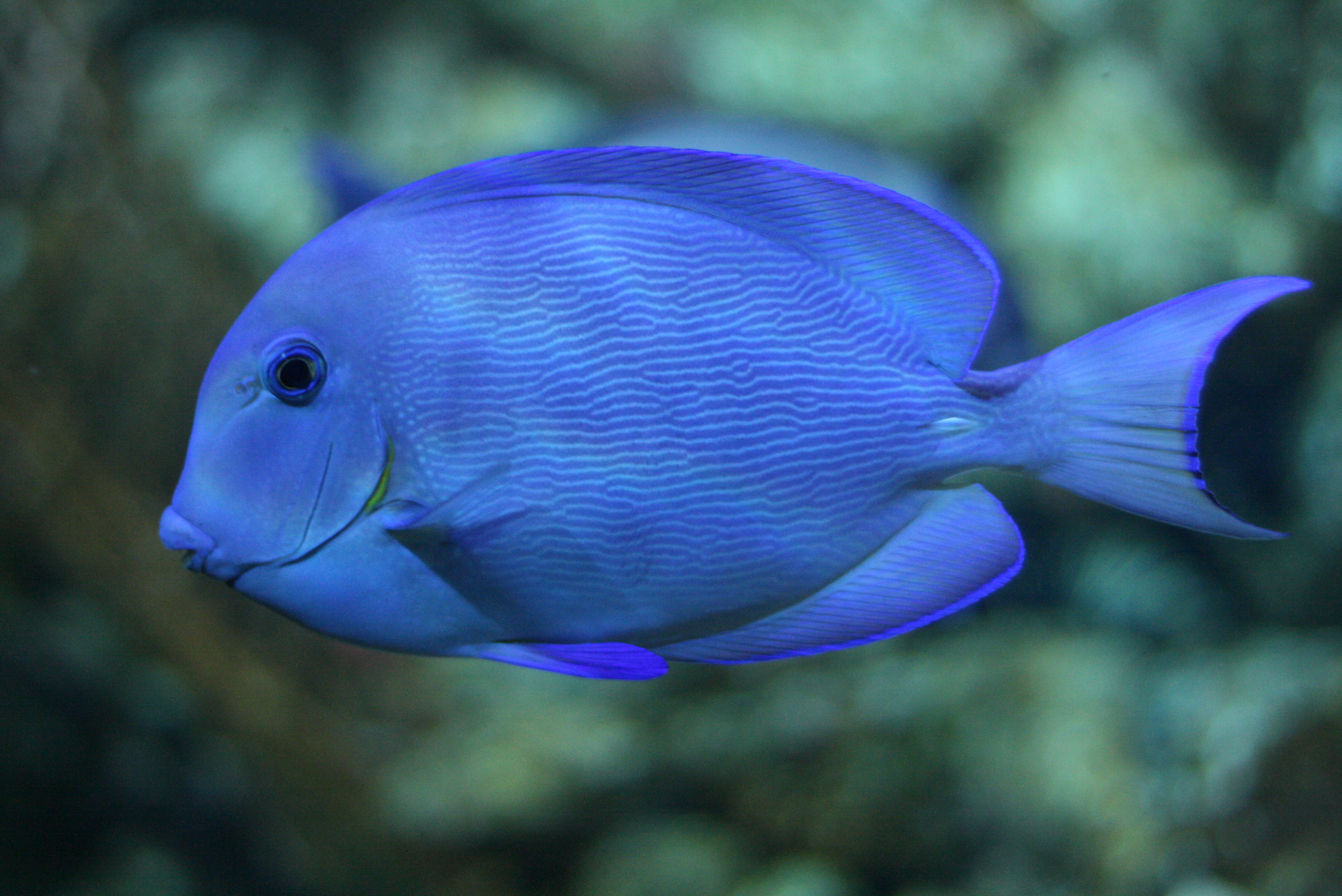
Growth series: from youngest juvenile to adult

== Ecology ==
=== Feeding ===
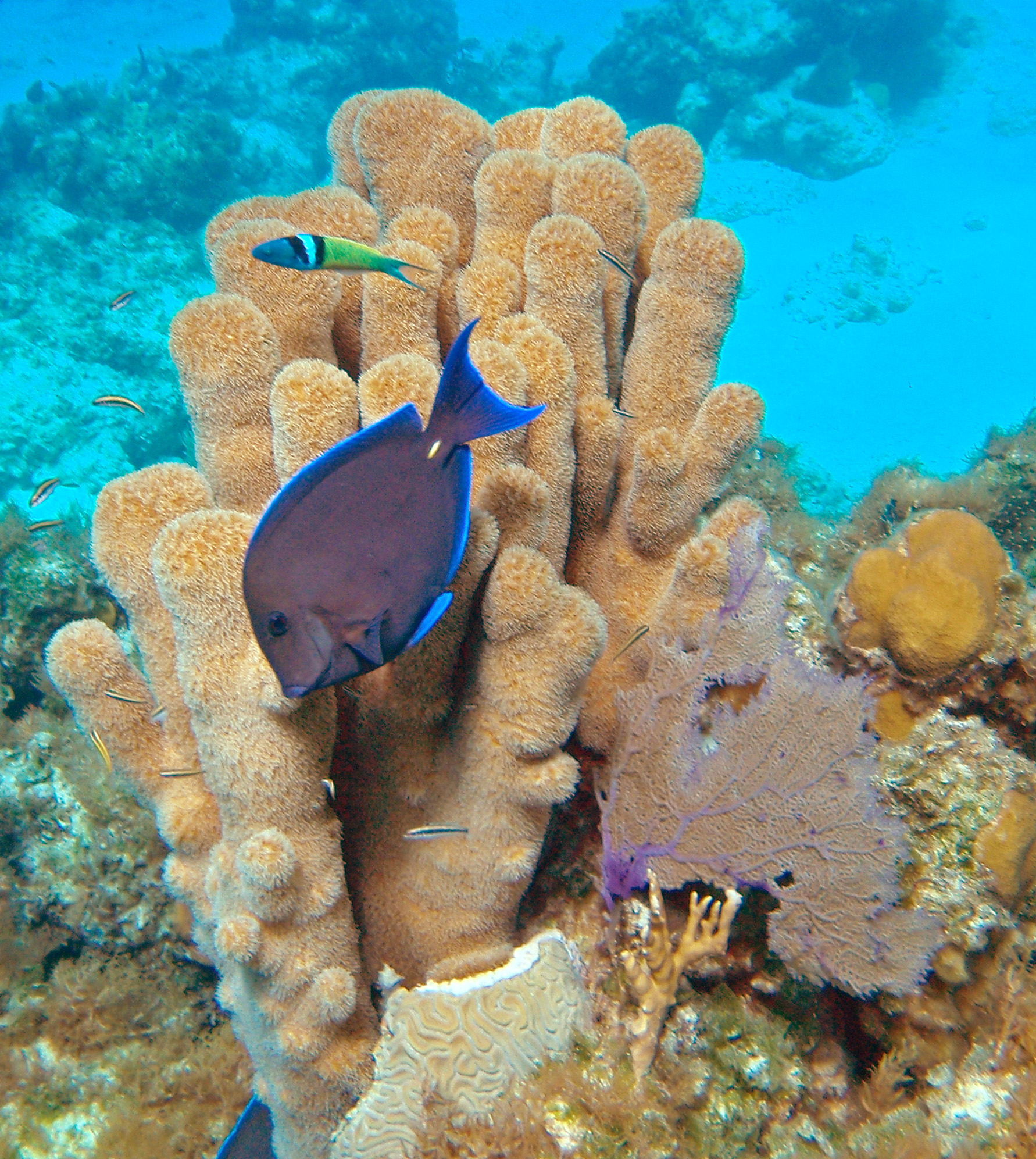
In the Bahamas

Atlantic blue tangs inhabit coral reefs as well as nearby grassy and rocky coastal areas where algae are abundant. They are herbivorous, feeding primarily on filamentous algae, detritus and plankton. They eat the algae from the reefs in which they reside, as well as off the bodies of surrounding fish. By eating the algae off of other fish, the blue tang serve as cleaners for them. With the decline in the Diadema antillarum (sea urchin) population, the blue tang population increased since the algal resources that the two animals usually competed for were more abundant.

Juvenile blue tangs feed frequently and at high rates. This heavy feeding requirement is due to their poor utilization of food resources. The blue tang's stomach and intestinal lining are proficient at absorbing crushed cellular content, but are not very effective at processing cellulose. This digestive system inefficiency leads blue tangs to spend more time and resources on foraging on a very abundant and fast-growing food source in close proximity. This close proximity to an abundant food source allows for continuous foraging.

==== Food competition ====
Food distribution, density, and accessibility can determine population density and territory size in blue tangs. Territories with low biogenic structure are larger than those of higher biogenic structure. Since the algal food resources are less dense in low-biogenic structured areas, these territories would have to be larger in order to include the necessary amount of food. This is in accordance with the Ideal free distribution model. This model states that competitors should adjust their distribution in accordance with habitat quality such that each individual will gain the same amount of resources.

According to this model, there should be a lower density of blue tangs on low-biogenic structured territories compared to higher-biogenic structured territories where there is a higher abundance of food. In both territories, each individual will receive similar amounts of resources due to competition. There is no significant difference in feeding rates of blue tangs on each type of territory, meaning that those in larger, uncolonized, and low density territories can match the resources of those in smaller high density territories.

=== Cleaning behavior ===
Atlantic blue tangs engage in cleaning behaviors with other fish as both cleaners and clients. In these interactions, cleaners remove parasites and other materials from the surface of the client. Clients benefit by having ectoparasites and damaged tissue removed from the outside of their body. Removal of unwanted organisms and tissue can lead to improved health maintenance.

==== Cleaner interactions ====
Atlantic blue tangs act as cleaners by grazing algae as well as eating molted skin and parasites off of the client's flesh once the client comes to the cleaning station. The most common client in these interactions is the green turtle, in which the blue tang inspects the green turtle by nipping its head, limbs, tail, and carapace.

==== Client interactions ====
When acting as clients, blue tangs normally approach cleaning stations inhabited by cleaner gobies. Cleaners must be careful because the spine on both sides of the caudal peduncle are sharp and can inflict painful wounds.

When in the client role, blue tangs will pose as they enter the cleaning station. Posing occurs before the cleaners inspect the incoming client fish. Fish who pose while in cleaning stations have a higher chance of getting cleaned. Blue tangs almost exclusively pose through head stands.

==== Wound healing ====
Clients who are cleaned by blue tang benefit after suffering an injury. Blue tangs incur many minor injuries, but infection as a result of injuries rarely leads to death. Recovery rates from both minor and major injuries are very high in blue tangs. Injured blue tangs are found to spend more time in cleaning stations compared to those further along in the healing process. This indicates that cleaning plays an important role in the wound healing process. Cleaners pick at the wound and eat the dead tissue in the peripheral area.

=== Social modes ===
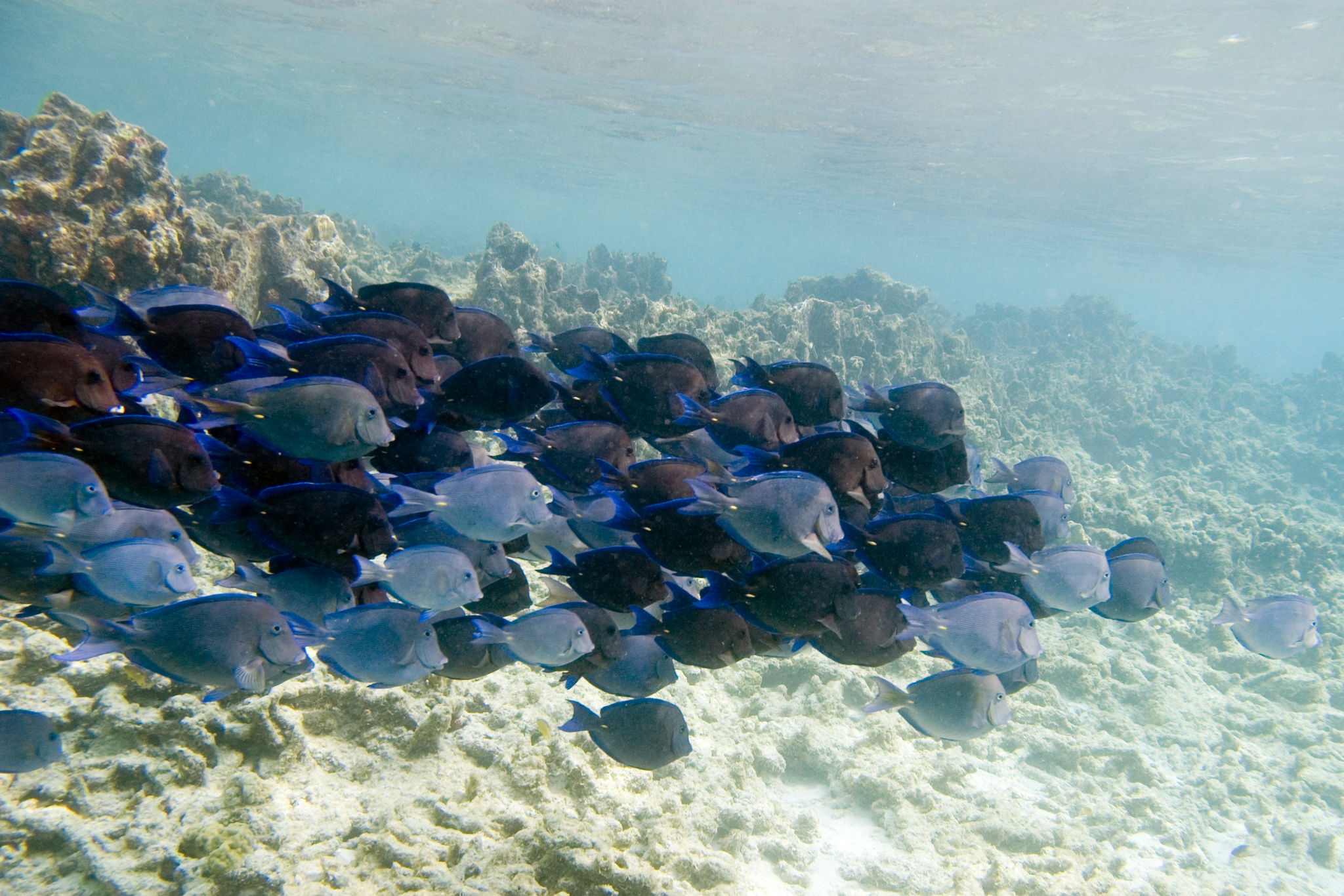
Schooling, in Bonaire

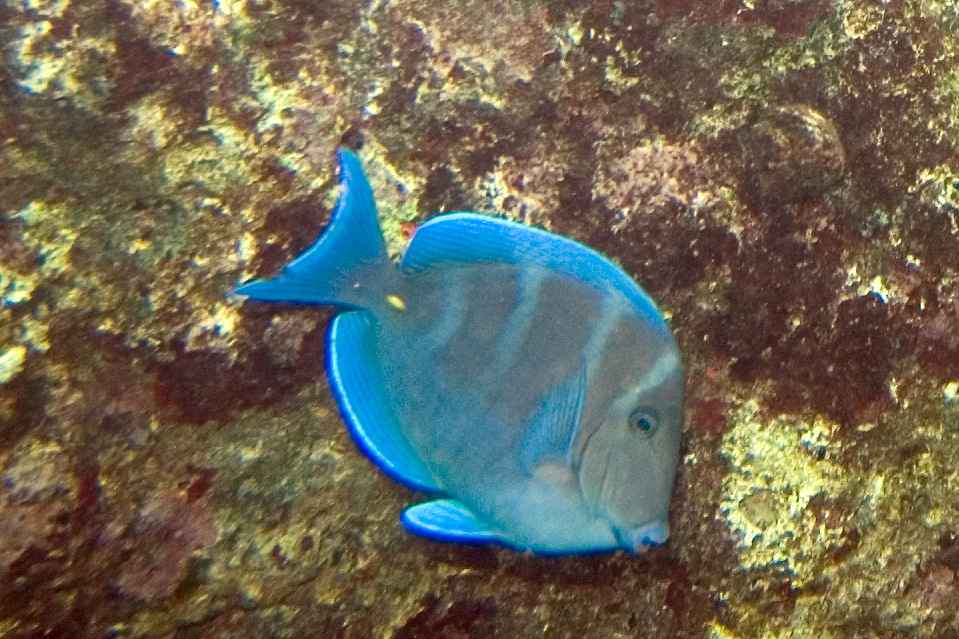
Showing vertical bars

Blue tangs experience three different social modes: territorial, schooling, and wandering. Blue tangs in non-territorial modes form schools and wander, while territorial blue tangs do not. Territoriality reduces competition for food resources because one individual claims both a territory and its resources. Additionally, schooling allows fish to better overcome food defense by others, and wandering allows for individual movement to feeding areas, cleaning stations, and other resources. Social behaviors are affected by outside conditions such as damselfish density, conspecific population density, and life history stage.

Those in the territorial mode are aggressive and actively chase intruding blue tangs. They swim slower and feed more frequently than non-territorial blue tangs. Schooling fish form compact groups with other blue tangs in addition to other species. Territorial blue tangs are found most often in the reef flat zone (sandy-bottomed with rocks or coral) and are rarely found in the spur zone (low coral ridges) or groove zone (sandy bottom channels). Territoriality prevalence decreases with increasing damselfish population, and the time of day also does not affect territoriality prevalence.

Fish in schooling mode swim fast, eat at intermediate rates, and are not aggressive, even though they are often chased by damselfish. Schooling is most prevalent in areas with high damselfish densities such as the groove zone, spur zone, and crest zone (shallow reef area), while schools are most prevalent near midday. Blue tangs are often seen schooling with midnight parrotfish.

Wandering blue tangs are often chased by other fish, and also visit cleaning stations more often than those in the other modes. Wandering is found most often in the reef back zone (enclosed region with irregular patches of algae, rock and sand) and during the morning. With an increase in conspecific population density, blue tang individuals become more territorial. Small, juvenile blue tangs are territorial, but the incidence of territoriality in the larger classes decreases. However, in these fish, schooling and wandering increases.

==== Juvenile behavior ====
Juvenile blue tangs exhibit different behavior than both conspecific and congeneric adults. Juveniles are prevalent in the reef crest zone, spur zone, and on the fringe of the reef flat zone, but are rare inside of the reef flat zone. Juveniles remain solitary on their home ranges, and home range territory size increases with body size. These territories overlap with those of Stegastes damselfish. Juvenile blue tangs are aggressive in territory defense. They try to avoid Stegastes, and are rarely chased by these damselfish.

== Relationship with humans ==
While not under human threat, the Atlantic blue tang is caught for commercial fishing, but maintains little importance to Caribbean industry. It is also used, though rarely, as bait. It is also common in the aquarium trade.

The fish is of low commercial value, giving off a pungent stench. Ciguatera poisoning may occur if the flesh is consumed. The adult fish's caudal spine is sharp, and is only out when the fish experiences excitement of some form. These fins can cut very deep into human skin and have been known to result in infections, mainly characterized by swelling and discoloration. Pain from such infections can last for long periods of time, sometimes for hours. Some species of the genus Acanthurus are even thought to possess poison glands on their caudal spines.

== Gallery ==
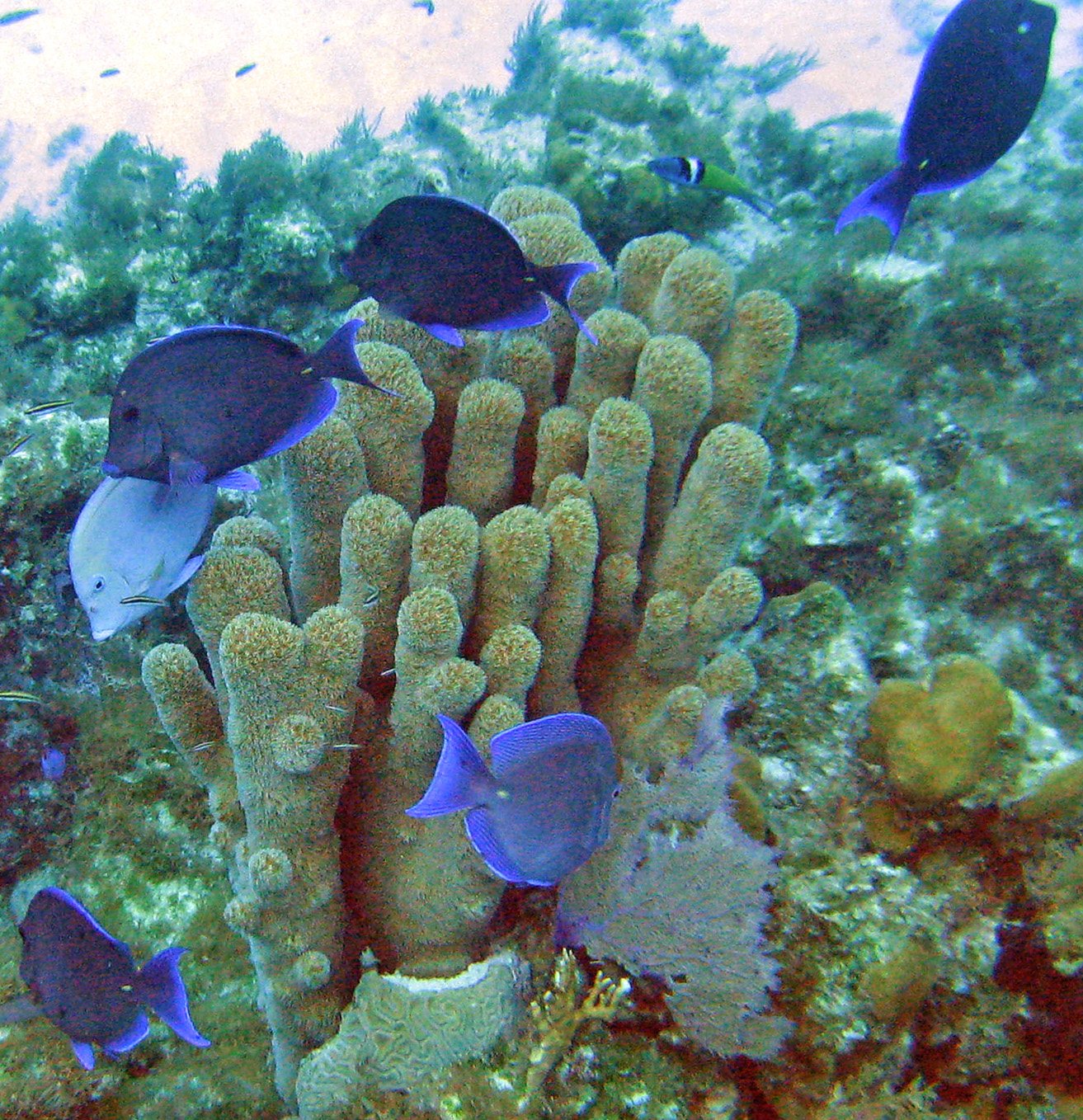
At San Salvador Island, Bahamas, with Dendrogyra cylindrus coral.

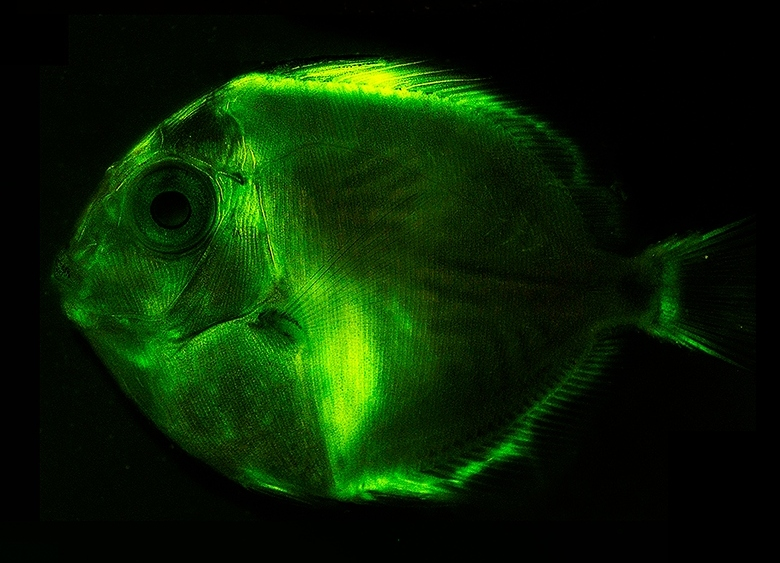
Juvenile showing biofluorescence
