= Institut de Recherche en Astrophysique et Planétologie =

French laboratory of space astrophysics

The Institut de Recherche en Astrophysique et Planétologie (IRAP), formerly the Centre d'Etude Spatiale des Rayonnements (CESR), is a French laboratory of space astrophysics. It is located in Toulouse. The center's main areas of investigation are: space plasmas, planetology, the high energy universe, and the cold universe.

The center is jointly operated by CNRS and Toulouse's Paul Sabatier University, and was opened on 1 January 2011.

== Projects ==
The ChemCam instrument on the Curiosity rover (Mars Science Laboratory) was developed by CESR in conjunction with the Los Alamos National Laboratory. It landed on the planet Mars in August 2012.

The SuperCam instrument on the Perseverance rover (Mars 2020) was developed by IRAP in conjunction with the Los Alamos National Laboratory. It landed on the planet Mars in February 2021.

== See also ==
- Observatoire Midi-Pyrénées – Astronomy organisation in Toulouse, France
