= Queen parrotfish =

- Terminal phase
- Initial phase

Conservation status
- Least Concern (IUCN 3.1)

Scientific classification
- Kingdom: Animalia
- Phylum: Chordata
- Class: Actinopterygii
- Division: Teleostei
- Order: Labriformes
- Family: Labridae
- Subfamily: Scarinae
- Tribe: Scarini
- Genus: Scarus
- Species: S. vetula

Binomial name
- Scarus vetula Bloch & Schneider, 1801

Colorful species of herbivorous fish in Atlantic Ocean and Caribbean Sea

The queen parrotfish (Scarus vetula), is a species of parrotfish or marine ray-finned fish that belongs to the family Labridae, part of the subfamily Scarinae. It is found on reefs in the tropical West Atlantic Ocean and the Caribbean Sea. Other common names include blownose, blue chub, blue parrotfish, blueman, joblin crow parrot, moontail, okra peji and slimy head. The initial phase is female, displaying a reddish-brown color, and quite different in appearance from the bluish-green color of the final phase male. This is a common species throughout its range and the International Union for Conservation of Nature has rated its conservation status as "least concern".

== Description ==
Adult queen parrotfishes are heavy-bodied fish with fusiform (spindle-shaped) bodies and beak-like mouths, growing to a length of about 60 cm (24 in). This species is a protogynous hemaphrodite, with the capacity to change sex, while simultaneously displaying sexual dichromatism. A total of 3 life phases have been identified, each with distintict coloration that indicates the maturity stage, including: juvenile (JU: <15 cm FL), initial (IP 15 to 35 cm FL) and terminal phases (TP: 28 to 50 cm FL). All initial phase individuals are female, being reddish-brown or grayish-brown with a paler head and a white lateral stripe low on each flank, and that remains the color scheme for them even when they grow larger. At an average length of 25 cm (10 in), females change sex to become males. The larger males move on to a new color phase, becoming pale bluish-green, with blue spots near the mouth, yellowish streaks between the mouth and eye, and pale blue bars on the pectoral fins.

== Diet, ecology and reproduction ==
Terminal phase

Initial phase

The queen parrotfish is native to the tropical West Atlantic Ocean, the Caribbean Sea and the southern Gulf of Mexico. It is found on both rocky and coral reefs at depths down to about 25 m (80 ft). The queen parrotfish feeds primarily on the algal turf it can scrape off surfaces, and coral from coral reefs, but may also eat sponges and other encrusting organisms as it feeds. As part of the Scarus genera, all species display the same feeding mode, as opposed to the Sparisoma genera, which employs 3 distinct feeding modes. In the process, it swallows a lot of mineral particles which are deposited on the seabed as fine sand. Depending on the species and size, different rates of sediment deposition are achieved throughout the reef. It is a diurnal fish, and rests on the seabed or hides in a crevice at night, immersed in a layer of mucus that it exudes and which may help to disguise it from predators. This mucus acts a cocoon, composed of a complex disulphate bonded network or glycoproteins. This protection then serves crucial as queen parrotfish can be preyed on by a variety of predators, such as sharks, groupers and eels. Parrotfishes serve multiple functions in a reef based on their feeding modes, including: scraping, excavating and browsing. These functions are based on differences in jaw morphology that permit different amounts of substrate to be removed. For example, the stoplight parrotfish (Sparisoma viride) is an "excavator" and degrades the surface of coral colonies, but Scarus vetula is a "scraper", causing erosion of carbonate materials from corals but to a lesser extent than S. viride. It has been shown that S. vetula has a higher bite rate than S. viride, which implies that forging behavior is different not only from a morphology perspective, but from a functional perspective. Both species have robust jaws with crenelated margins and strong jaw muscles, and large individuals of S. vetula can do considerable damage to corals as they scrape off their food.

They are protogynous hermaphrodites, where the initial phase is female and the terminal phase is male. They are often found in small groups of four or five, consisting of one final-phase male and several initial-phase females. During courtship, the male constantly circles a female until they join and both simultaneously release spawn into the sea. After fertilization, the eggs hatch and the developing larvae form part of the plankton.

== Conservation status ==
The queen parrotfish is a common species, and the International Union for Conservation of Nature has rated its conservation status as "least concern". Nonetheless, the species still encounters a number of threats due to anthropogenic disturbances. In general, the major challenges that parrotfish conservation faces is overfishing and habitat degradation. To combat this increasing problem, marine protected areas (MPA) are utilized as a strategy to not only aid in the recovery of fish populations but protect the habitats in which they are targeted. However, it appears that depending solely on the use of MPAs may not result as effective, since the system in which the species is found is not closed and external variables, perhaps even distant to the protected area, may pose a significant interaction. In some cases, the success of MPAs were hindered due to poor management and failure to ensure the maintenance and recovery of parrotfish populations. A method used to evaluate the effectiveness of an MPA is to directly compare visual census data from predatory fish and key herbivorous species (such as parrotfishes), where biomass and abundance are utilized to observe the structure and composition of fish communities.
