= Société Française d'Astronomie et d'Astrophysique =

The Société Française d'Astronomie et d'Astrophysique (SF2A) is a French society of professional astronomers. It was officially created on November 15, 1978, with Raymond Michard as the first president. The main goal of the society is the promotion of astronomy in France, associating to it the specialists of the field. The society also represent France in the International Astronomical Union. Its current membership is about 400, under the presidency of Nadège Lagarde.

Each year the SF2A awards a scientific prize to a junior researcher, who must be younger than 36 and who must hold a permanent research position; and a prize for the best doctoral thesis in astronomy (defended in France, during the previous year). The SF2A also edits a directory listing all the French astronomers. An annual meeting is organized that supports the communication of recent research results by young astronomers, the debate of more political issues related to astronomy, and the gathering of the various members of the French astronomical community.
