= Stony coral tissue loss disease =

Disease affecting corals

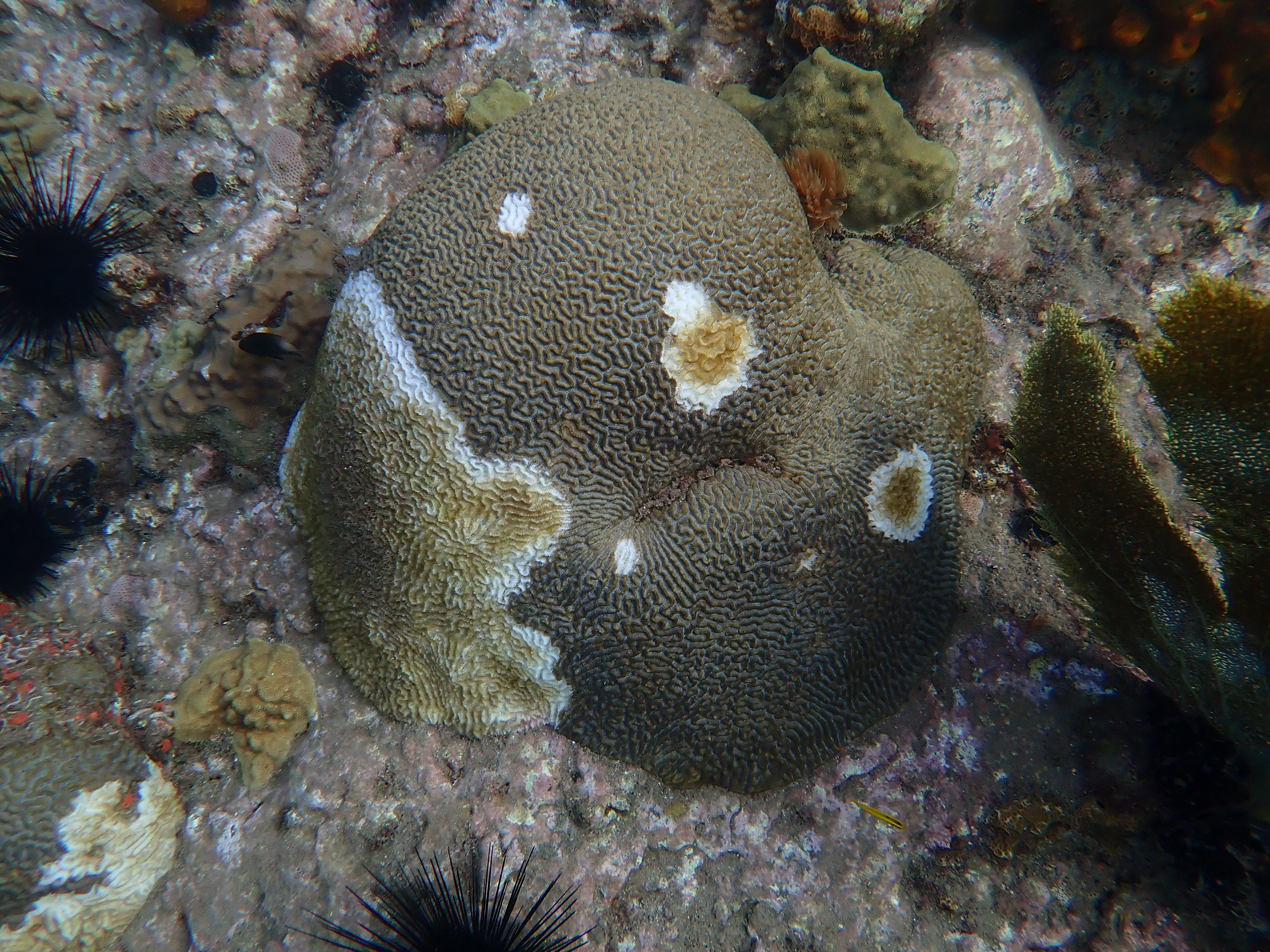
Brain coral affected by SCTLD

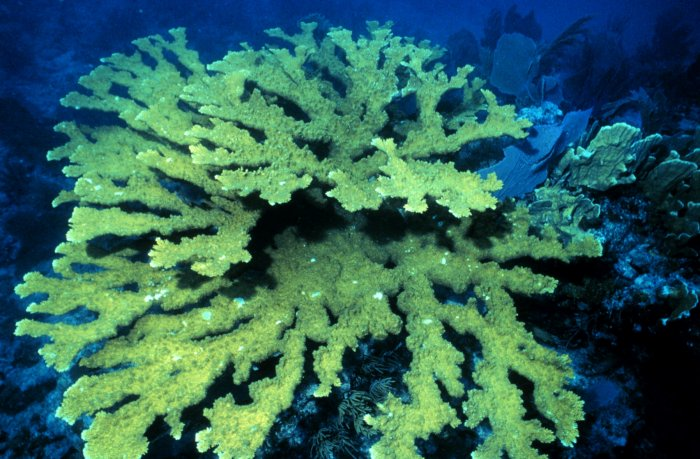
Elkhorn coral seems to be immune to SCTLD.

Stony coral tissue loss disease (SCTLD) is a disease of corals that first appeared off the southeast coast of Florida in 2014. It originally was described as white plague disease. By 2019 it had spread along the Florida Keys and had appeared elsewhere in the Caribbean Sea. The disease destroys the soft tissue of at least 22 species of reef-building corals, killing them within weeks or months of becoming infected. The causal agent is unknown but is suspected to be either a bacterium or a virus with a bacterium playing a secondary role. The degree of susceptibility of a coral, the symptoms, and the rate of progression of the disease vary between species. Due to its rapid spread, high mortality rate, and lack of subsidence, it has been regarded as the deadliest coral disease ever recorded, with wide-ranging implications for the biodiversity of Caribbean coral reefs.

== History ==
The disease was first detected in late 2014 when a few corals off Virginia Key, in Miami-Dade County, Florida, were affected. By the following year, the disease had spread and extended from Pompano Beach to Biscayne National Park. In 2016 it reached Palm Beach County, Florida, and the upper Florida Keys, and the next year the lower Florida Keys. By August 2018, the disease had spread over 150 mi^{2} (388 km^{2}) of sea, and almost half the species of coral growing in the Florida Reef Tract had been affected. By January 2019 it had been reported from Jamaica, the Mexican Caribbean, Saint Maarten, and Saint Thomas, U.S. Virgin Islands. It has since spread along the Lesser Antilles, and as of 2023, it has been reported as far south as Curacao.

A 2021 study suggested that the spread of the disease is likely facilitated by ballast water from ships, due to several cases of the disease crossing currents in the opposite direction that they would flow.

Data from the United States Virgin Islands shows that populations of susceptible corals and crustose coralline algae have been reduced by this disease, being replaced by fire coral, cyanobacteria, and macroalgae. A structural equation model spanning the Caribbean evinced versatility in reef fish, showing they associated with rugosity without regard for whether the coral was alive or dead. However, some declines due to stony coral tissue loss disease were still projected by the model, especially due to coral die-offs and loss of rugosity.

== Signs ==
The signs of this disease are somewhat variable, and it may be difficult to distinguish from other coral diseases. SCTLD manifests as rapidly expanding lesions on the coral. Sometimes the infection exhibits a series of blotches that radiate outwards and coalesce. Small corals may be killed within weeks while larger individuals may survive for months or even a year or two.

== Research ==
This is a particularly deadly coral disease with mortality rates varying between 66% and 100%. Although the cause of the disease has not yet been established, evidence suggests that a bacterial pathogen is being transmitted either by contact or by means of water movement. Not all corals are susceptible to the disease, with staghorn coral (Acropora cervicornis) and elkhorn coral (Acropora palmata), both of which are critically endangered, appearing to be immune.

A 2021 study by the Florida Fish and Wildlife Conservation Commission and U.S. Geological Survey involving electron microscopy of infected corals suggests that SCTLD may not be caused a bacterial agent as previously thought, but rather a virus that lethally affects the zooxanthellae of corals and leads to host cell death. In diseased corals, no pathologies were noted in the coral host cells aside from lysis, whereas zooxanthellae displayed chloroplast pathologies and potential single-stranded RNA viruses similar to those found in plant viruses. This may explain why amoxicillin paste, the only known effective treatment method, suppresses the growth of new lesions but does not prevent new lesions from forming. Given that amoxicillin is intended for bacteria, its apparent suppression of SCTLD lesions may be an unintended side-effect that affects the virus rather than actual suppression of a bacterial agent. Other studies instead suggest that the bacterium plays a secondary role in attacking weakened corals. Three strains of harmful bacteria are associated with the disease.

A 2023 study developed a potential probiotic treatment for SCTLD, obtained from Pseudoalteromonas bacteria isolated from SCTLD-resistant Montastraea corals. This may provide a more effective and efficient treatment compared to amoxicillin, which requires direct application, does not prevent reinfection, and may promote antibiotic resistance in the causal agent.

== Susceptibility ==
The first species on a reef to be infected are usually the meandroid corals such as pillar coral (Dendrogyra cylindrus), elliptical star coral (Dichocoenia stokes), smooth flower coral (Eusmilia fastigiata), and maze corals (Meandrina spp.). Other susceptible species include boulder brain coral (Colpophyllia natans), grooved brain coral (Diploria labyrinthiformis), maze coral (Meandrina meandrites), symmetrical brain coral (Pseudodiploria strigosa) and knobby brain coral (Pseudodiploria clivosa). The genetically distinct Florida population of pillar coral has been essentially extirpated in the wild, and now primarily survives only in captivity.

Limited lab experiments suggest that Indo-Pacific coral species may also be susceptible to this disease as many of them are of the same groups present in the Caribbean, which could have severe consequences if the disease happened to reach the Indo-Pacific via the Panama Canal. In contrast, other studies suggest that if SCTLD is of viral origins, the zooxanthellae clades inhabiting the Caribbean may be uniquely susceptible to it, in contrast to the Indo-Pacific, which is dominated by a different clade of zooxanthellae and has not seen major coral diseases.

== Conservation ==
Due to the wide-ranging effects of the disease, many of the susceptible coral species have had fragments harvested from the wild, which have then been taken into captivity across the United States for the purpose of conservation, captive breeding and selective breeding, until either conditions improve or the captive corals develop resilience to the disease.
