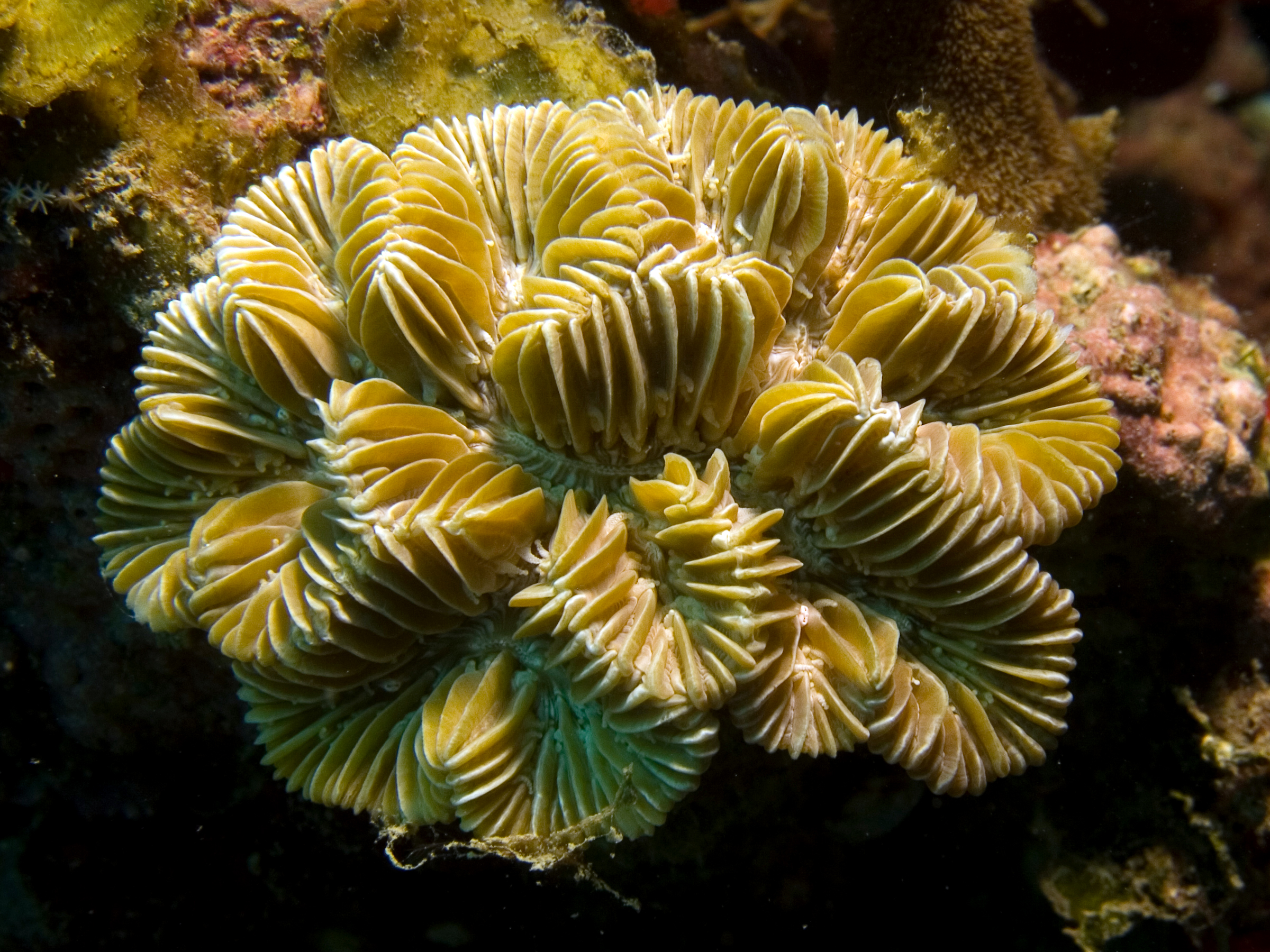

Conservation status
- Critically Endangered (IUCN 3.1)

- Apparently Secure (NatureServe)

Scientific classification
- Kingdom: Animalia
- Phylum: Cnidaria
- Subphylum: Anthozoa
- Class: Hexacorallia
- Order: Scleractinia
- Family: Meandrinidae
- Genus: Meandrina
- Species: M. meandrites

Binomial name
- Meandrina meandrites (Linnaeus, 1758)

Synonyms
- Goreaugyra memoralis Wells, 1973; Madrepora meandrites Linnaeus, 1758

= Meandrina meandrites =

Species of coral

Meandrina meandrites, commonly known as maze coral, is a species of colonial stony coral in the family Meandrinidae. It is found primarily on outer coral reef slopes in the Caribbean Sea and the Gulf of Mexico.

== Description ==
Meandrina meandrites forms massive hemispherical heads or develops into substantial flat plates and can grow to nearly 1 metre (3 ft 3 in) in diameter. Some small colonies are cone-shaped and are not attached to the substrate. These resemble young colonies of rose coral (Manicina areolata) and may be found in sandy or muddy areas some way off from reefs. The corallites, the calcareous cups secreted by the polyps, are 1 to 2 cm (0.4 to 0.8 in) wide. The raised walls between the corallites are formed from fine but widely separated transverse ridges called septa and meander over the surface of the coral. There is a slight indentation running along the crest of the walls where the septa from adjoining corallites meet. The polyps are large but are only protruded at night when they cover and obscure the skeleton of the coral.

== Distribution and habitat ==
Meandrina meandrites is found in Bermuda, Florida, the Caribbean Sea, the Gulf of Mexico and the Bahamas. It mainly occurs on the seaward sides of reefs but also occurs on the back slopes. Its favoured depth range is 8 to 30 metres (26 to 98 ft) but it occurs at any depth less than 80 metres (260 ft). It tolerates locations with high levels of sedimentation and turbidity. It is generally the coral most frequently seen in the deeper parts of its range.

== Status ==
On the IUCN Red List of Threatened Species, Meandrina meandrites was listed as being of Least Concern for most of the Red List's existence. However, the most recent assessment (2021) pushed this species to the category of Critically Endangered, under criteria A3c, based largely on predicted decline. The species is subject to coral diseases such as white plague and black band disease and has been decimated across its range by Stony Coral Tissue Loss Disease as it is considered a highly susceptible species with respect to this disease. Prior to the appearance of this disease, the species was considered fairly secure due to its ability to recover from bleaching events. Another factor that helped to maintain populations was the high level of recruitment of juvenile corals which is in contrast to the recruitment failures of the pineapple coral (Dichocoenia stokesi). The chief threats it faces, as do other Caribbean reef corals, are: SCTLD, raised sea temperatures, ocean acidification and reef destruction. It is present in a number of marine parks which gives it some level of protection.
