= Marker 32 =

Coral reef in the Florida Keys, US

- Location within Florida Location within the Caribbean

Location
- Location: Caribbean
- Coordinates: 24°28′30″N 081°44′40″W
- Country: United States

Geology
- Type: reef

Marker 32 is a coral reef located within the Florida Keys National Marine Sanctuary. It lies to the south of Key West, and is between Western Sambo reef and 9-Foot Stake reef. Unlike many reefs in the Sanctuary, it is not within a Sanctuary Preservation Area (SPA).

The reef is close to navigational marker 32.

== Gallery ==
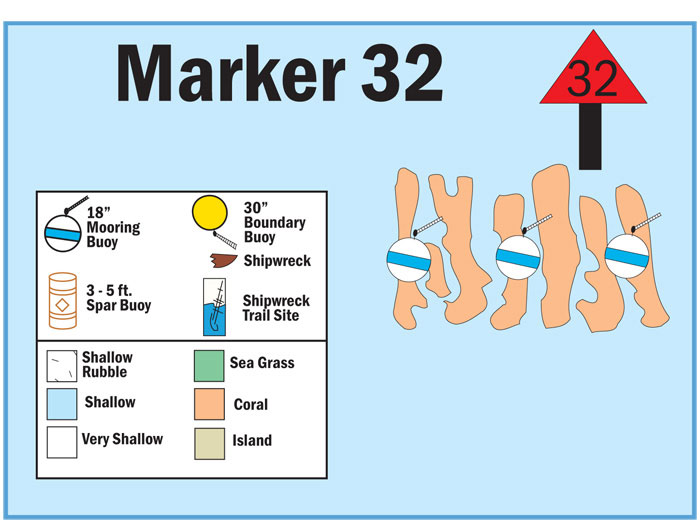
NOAA map of the reef

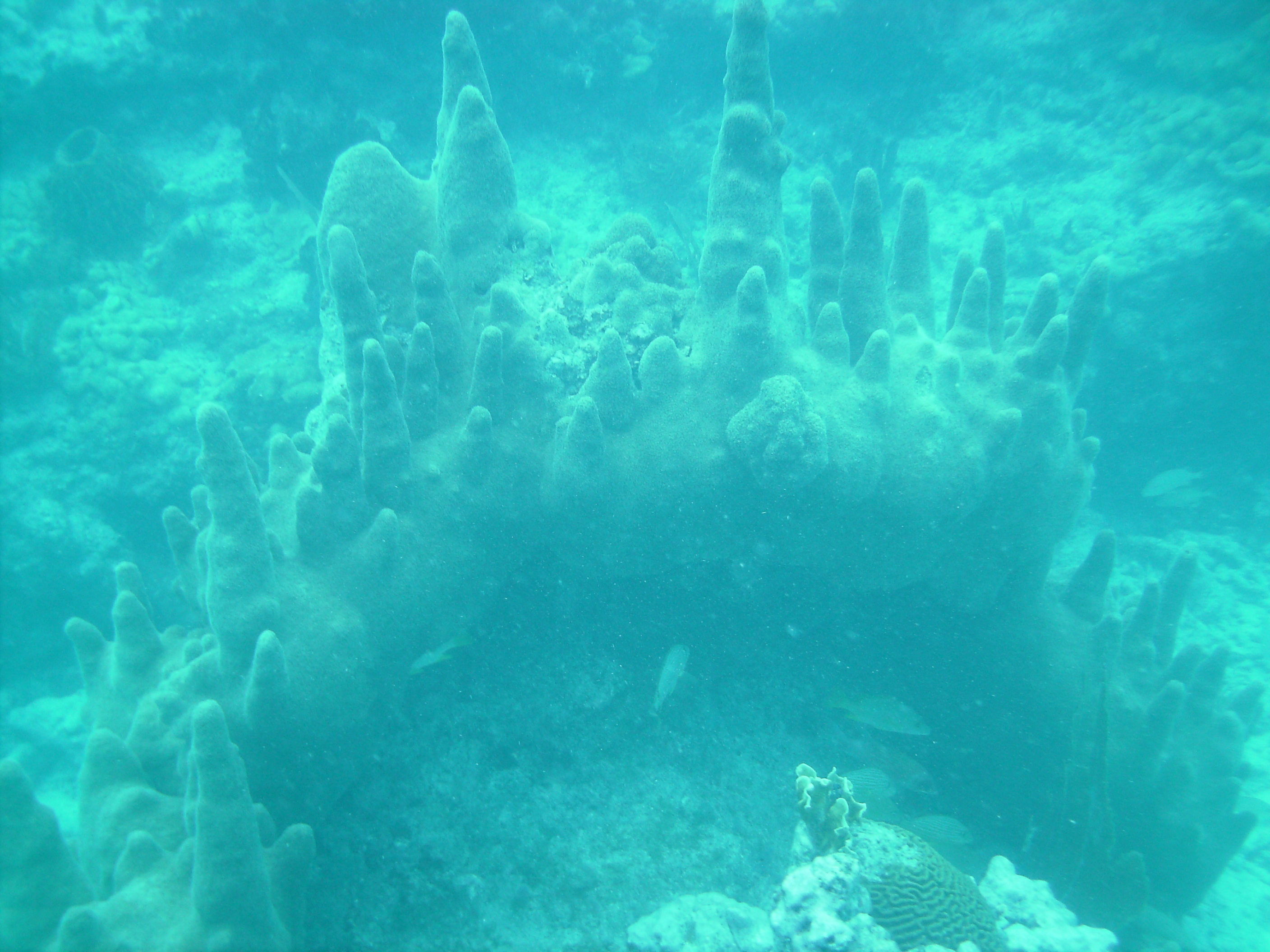
A large colony of pillar coral (Dendrogyra cylindrus) at Marker 32 reef, June 2010

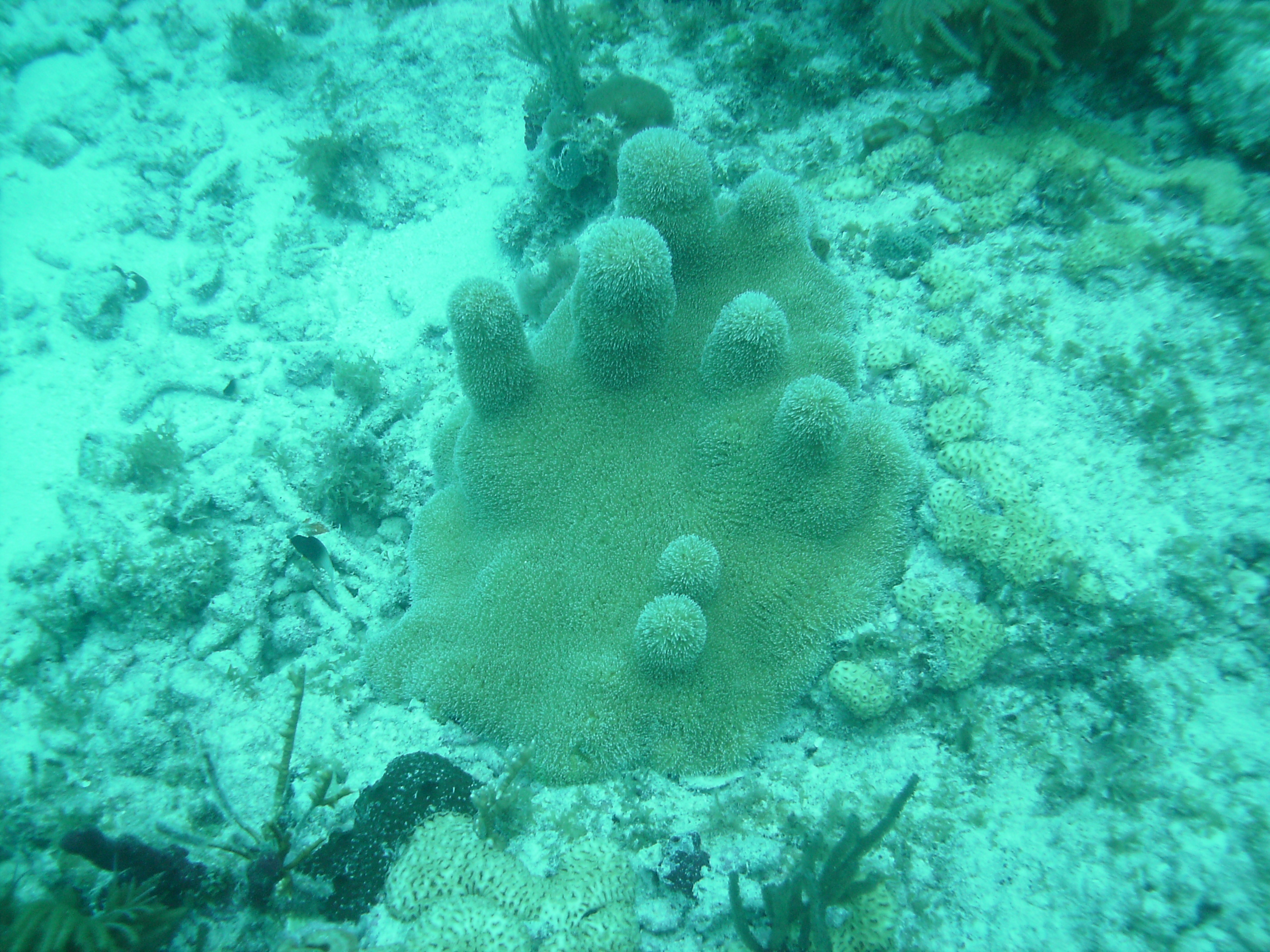
A small colony of pillar coral at Marker 32 reef, June 2010

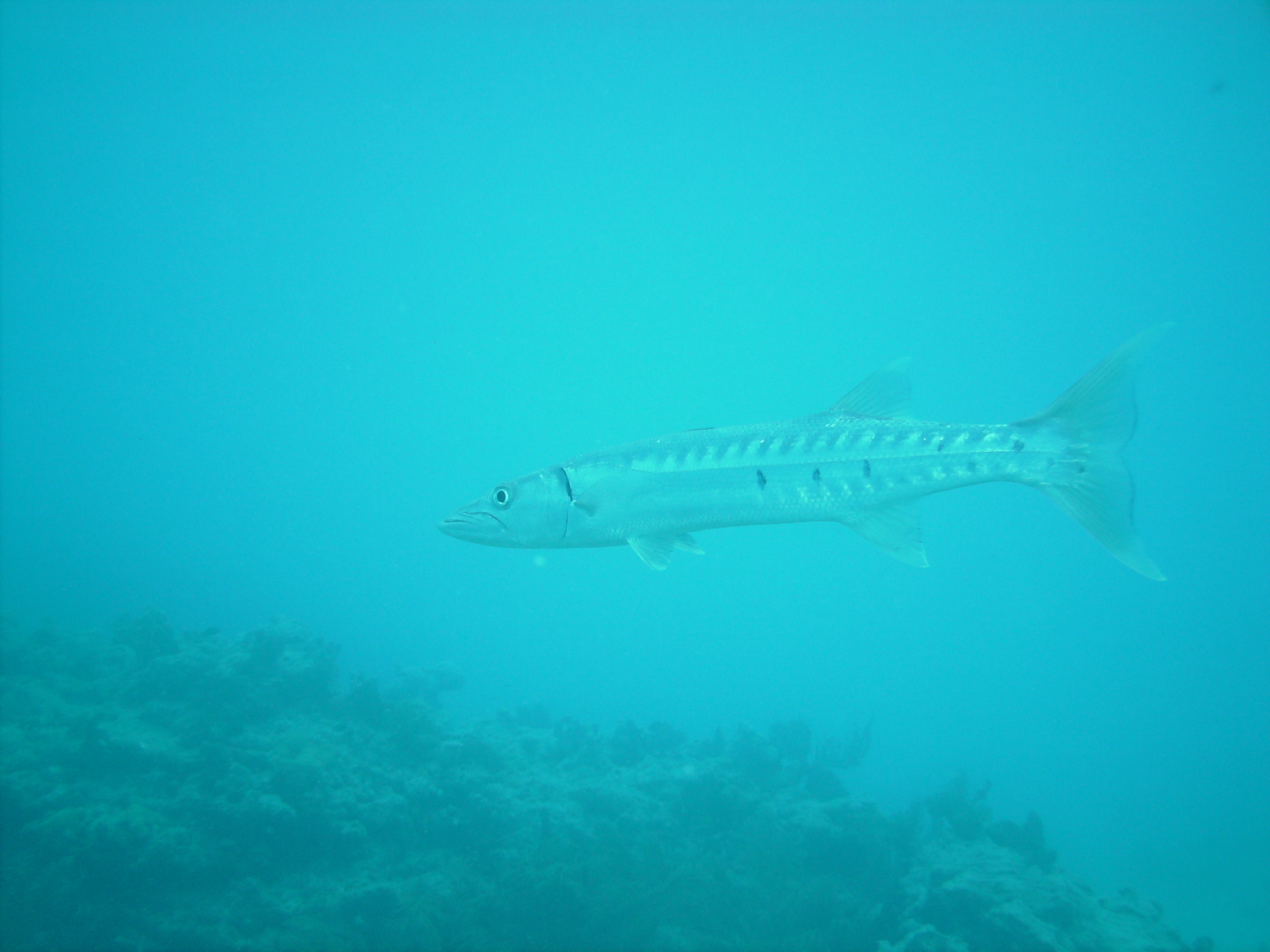
Large barracuda at Marker 32 reef, June 2010

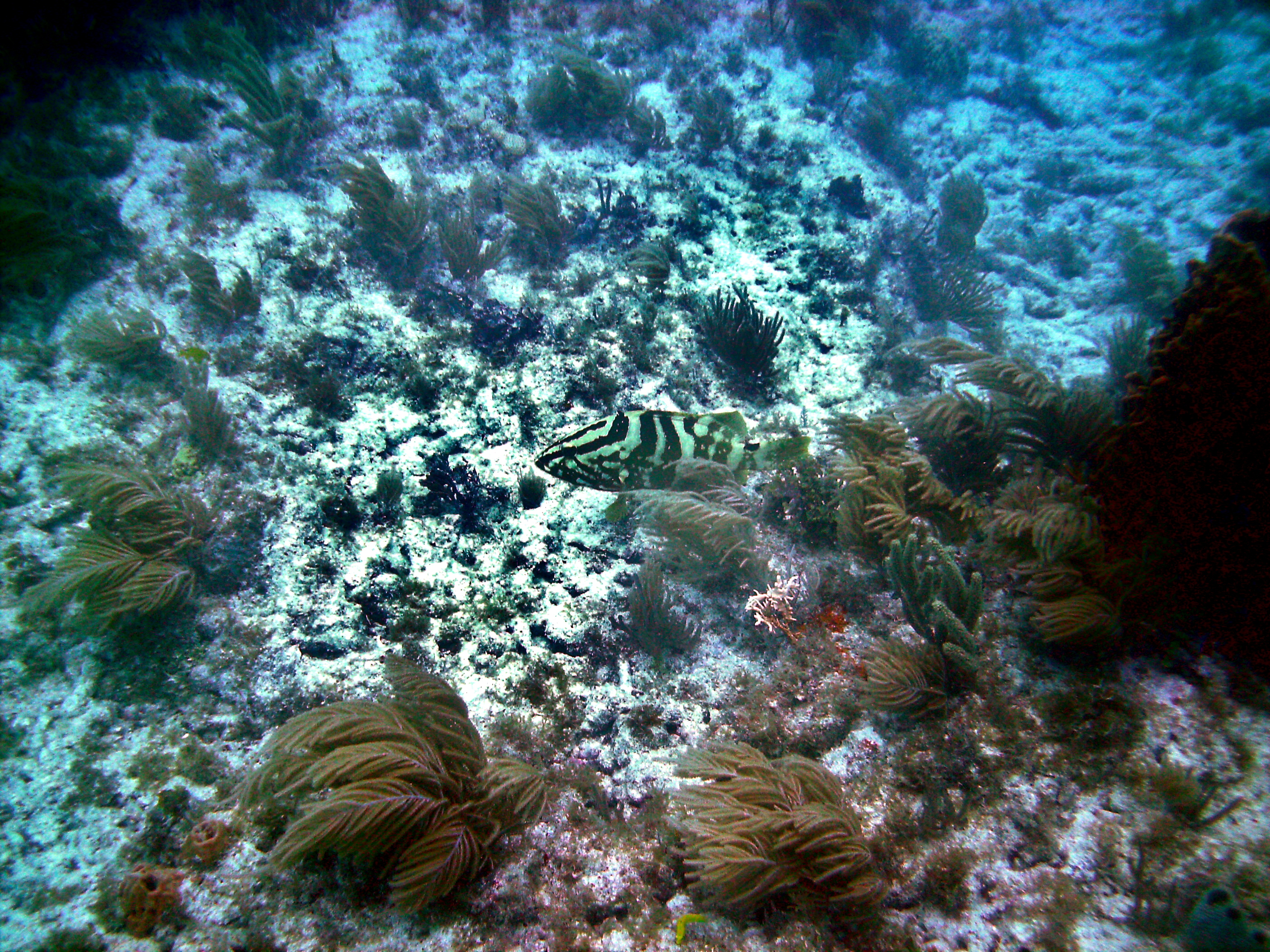
Endangered Nassau grouper (Epinephelus striatus) at Marker 32 reef, June 2010
