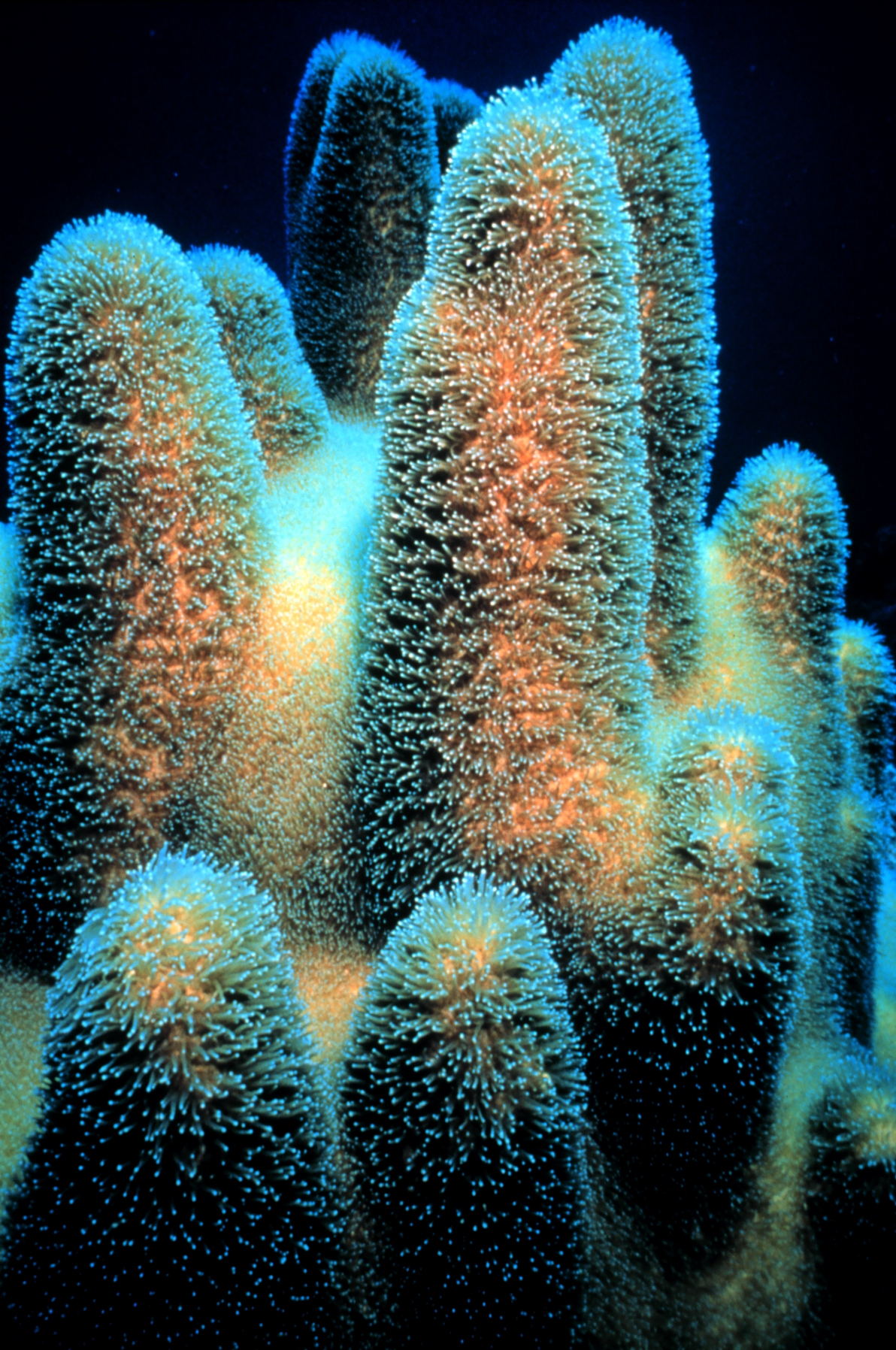

Conservation status
- Critically Endangered (IUCN 3.1)

- Endangered (ESA)

Scientific classification
- Kingdom: Animalia
- Phylum: Cnidaria
- Subphylum: Anthozoa
- Class: Hexacorallia
- Order: Scleractinia
- Family: Meandrinidae
- Genus: Dendrogyra; Ehrenberg, 1834
- Species: D. cylindrus

Binomial name
- Dendrogyra cylindrus Ehrenberg, 1834

Synonyms
- List (Genus): Maeandra (Dendrogyra) Ehrenberg, 1834; (Species): Dendrogyra cylindricus Ehrenberg, 1834 [lapsus]; Maeandra (Dendrogyra) cylindrus Ehrenberg, 1834

= Pillar coral =

Species of coral

Pillar coral (Dendrogyra cylindrus) is a hard coral (order Scleractinia) found in the western Atlantic Ocean and the Caribbean Sea. It is the only species in the monotypic genus Dendrogyra. It is a digitate coral -that is, it resembles fingers (Latin digites) or a cluster of cigars, growing up from the sea floor without any secondary branching. It is large and can grow on both flat and sloping surfaces at depths down to 20 m (65 ft). It is one of the few types of hard coral in which the polyps can commonly be seen feeding during the day.

== Description ==
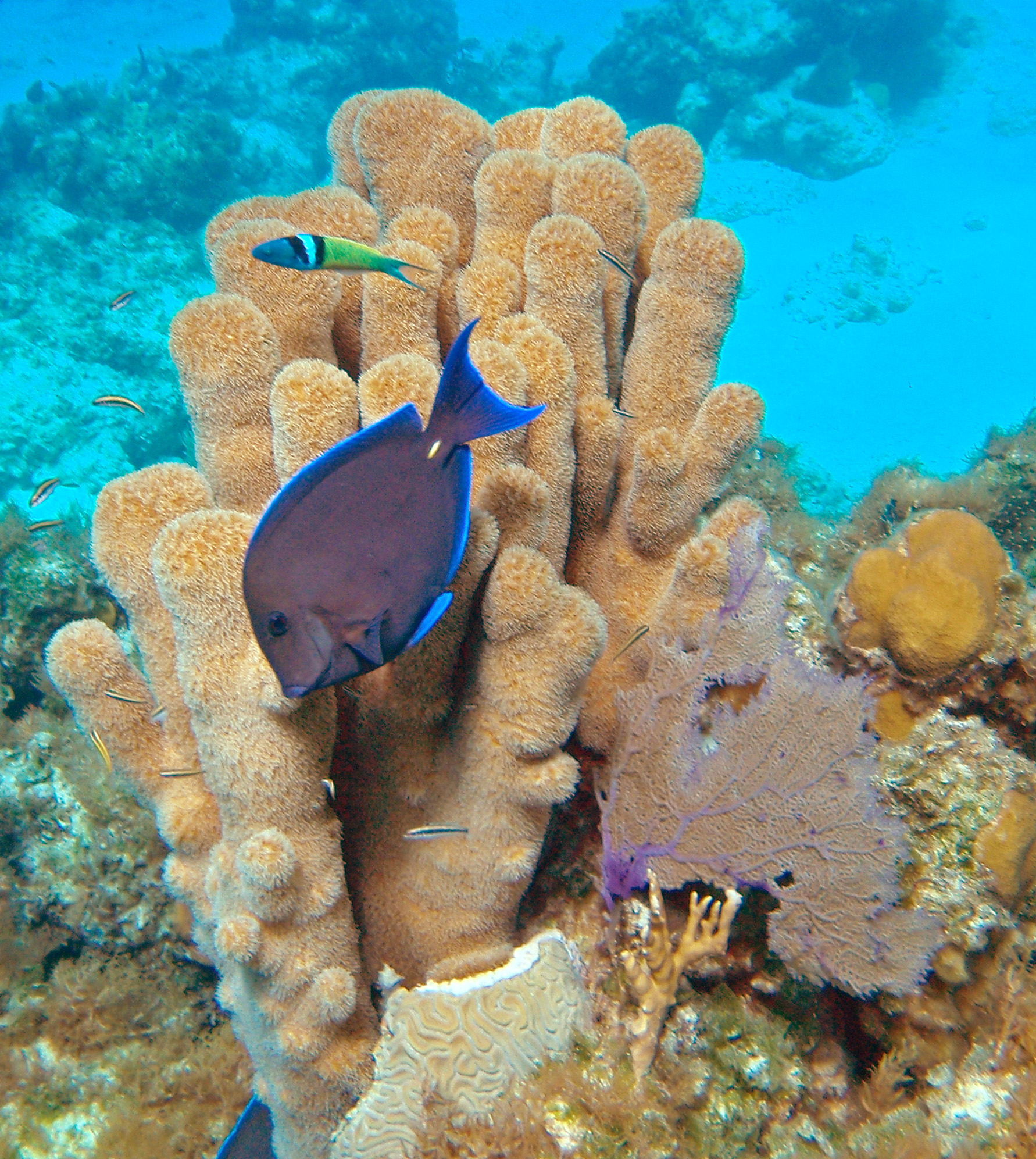
Pillar coral on a patch reef

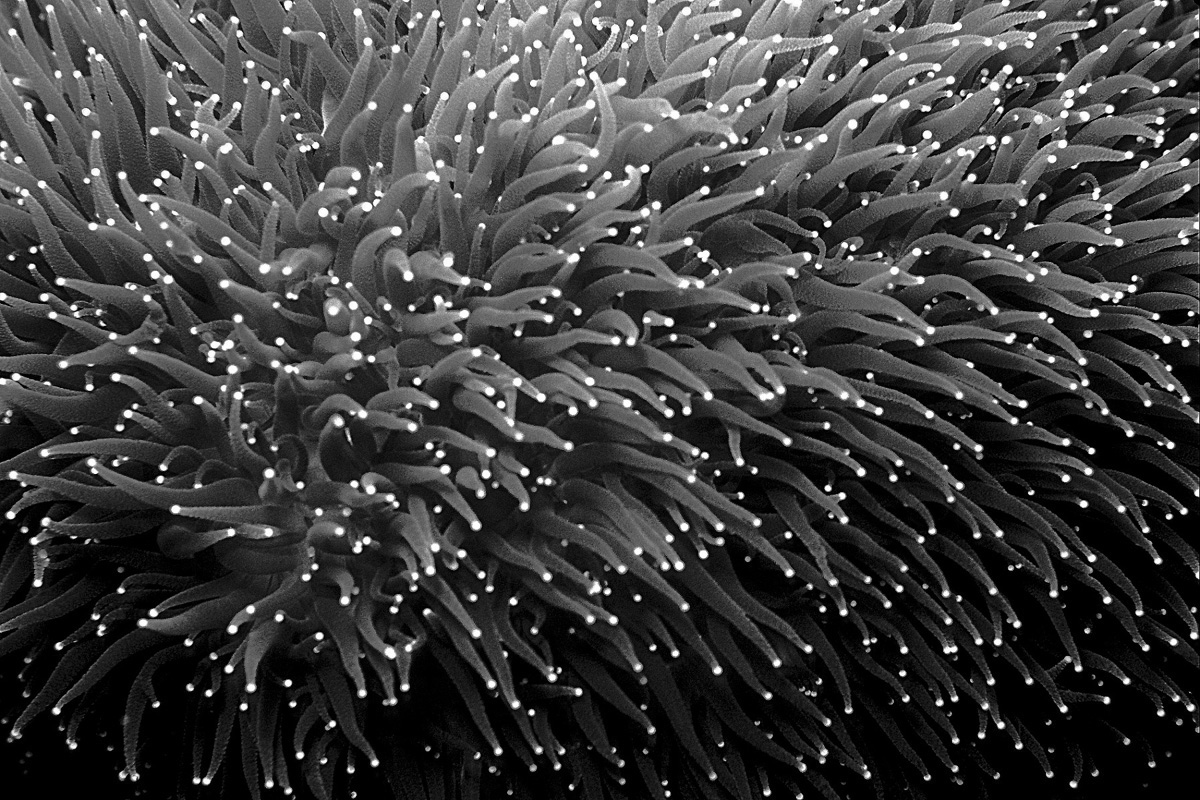
Close-up of polyps with tentacles extended

Pillar coral forms an encrusted base from which grow vertical cylindrical, round-ended columns. This coral can grow to a height of 3 m (10 ft) with pillars more than 10 cm (4 in) wide but is usually much smaller than this. The corallites from which the polyps protrude are smaller than 1 cm (0.4 in) in diameter and arranged in shallow meandering valleys with low ridges in between. The skeleton of the coral is not usually visible because the polyps are typically extended during the daytime, unlike most other coral species. The mass of undulating tentacles gives the coral a furry appearance. This coral is usually some shade of beige or brown.

== Distribution and habitat ==
Pillar corals are found in the warmer parts of the western Atlantic Ocean and the Caribbean Sea. Within its range, D. cylindrus is common in some places, but rare in other seemingly suitable locations. Some of the islands in the Bahamas have plentiful numbers of colonies as does the north coast of Jamaica. It used to be common on the reefs off the coast of Florida but has suffered from over-collection there. It seems to be absent from Bermuda and the coasts of Panama and Colombia. It usually grows on level or slightly sloping parts of the reef at depths between 1 and 20 metres (3 ft 3 in and 65 ft 7 in).

== Biology ==
Pillar coral is a zooxanthellate species, with symbiotic dinoflagellate algae living within the tissues. In sunlight these undergo photosynthesis and most of the organic compounds they produce are transferred to their host, while they make use of the coral's nitrogenous wastes. These algae give the coral its brownish colour and restrict it to living in shallow water into which the sunlight can penetrate.

Pillar coral is a slow-growing, long-lived species. A number of columns grow up from a basal plate; if the whole colony is dislodged and topples over, new cylindrical pillars can grow vertically from the fallen coral. Some specimens have been found where this has happened more than once, and the history of the colony can be deduced from its shape. If a pillar gets detached and becomes lodged in a suitable position, it can continue to live, sending up new pillars from the base and other parts of the column.

Each pillar coral clonal colony is either male or female, an evolutionary life history strategy described as gonochoric. However, hermaphroditic events have been recorded for the species. Sexual reproduction takes place with gametes being released into the water column where fertilisation takes place. The larvae that develop from the eggs are planktonic and drift with the currents before settling on the seabed to found new colonies.

== Status ==
The IUCN Red List of Threatened Species lists pillar coral as being Critically Endangered under criteria A2bce. This is because recruitment and survival rates of juveniles is low and this coral is particularly susceptible to both bleaching and white plague disease. It is resistant to strong wave action but can be wrecked by hurricanes and tropical storms. However, broken fragments regenerate well. Some of the localities in which it is found are in marine parks and in these it should be safe from human disturbance. In addition, the advent of stony coral tissue loss disease in Florida and the Caribbean is causing local extinctions and may have species-level effects on this species as it is infected at an early stage of the disease progression. Finally, it is a gonochoric species which was never particularly common within its range, making its reproductive potential lower than might otherwise be expected.

The species is functionally extinct in Florida, US, and mostly survives in captivity.

== Gallery ==
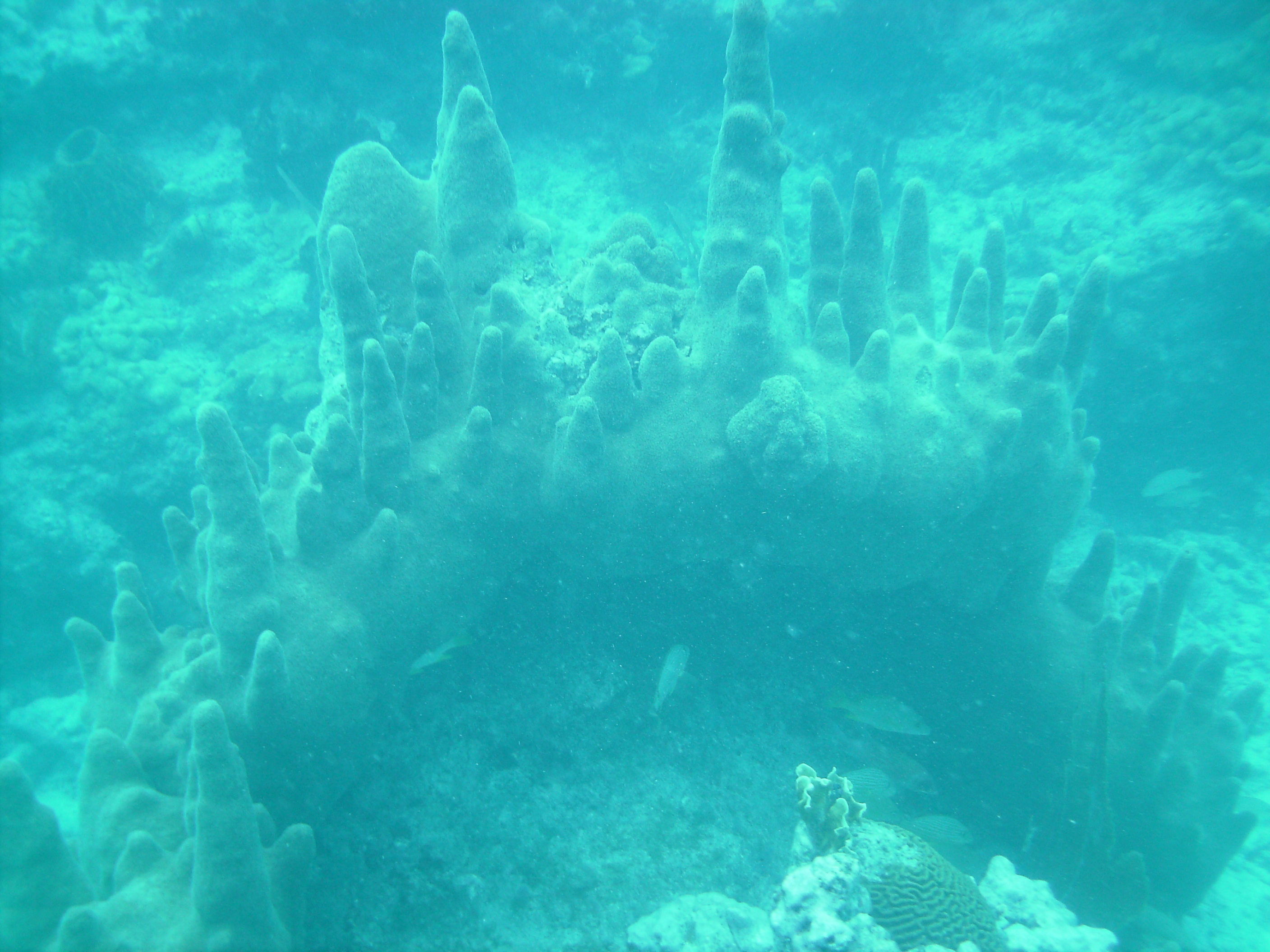
A large colony at Marker 32 reef in the Florida Keys, June 2010

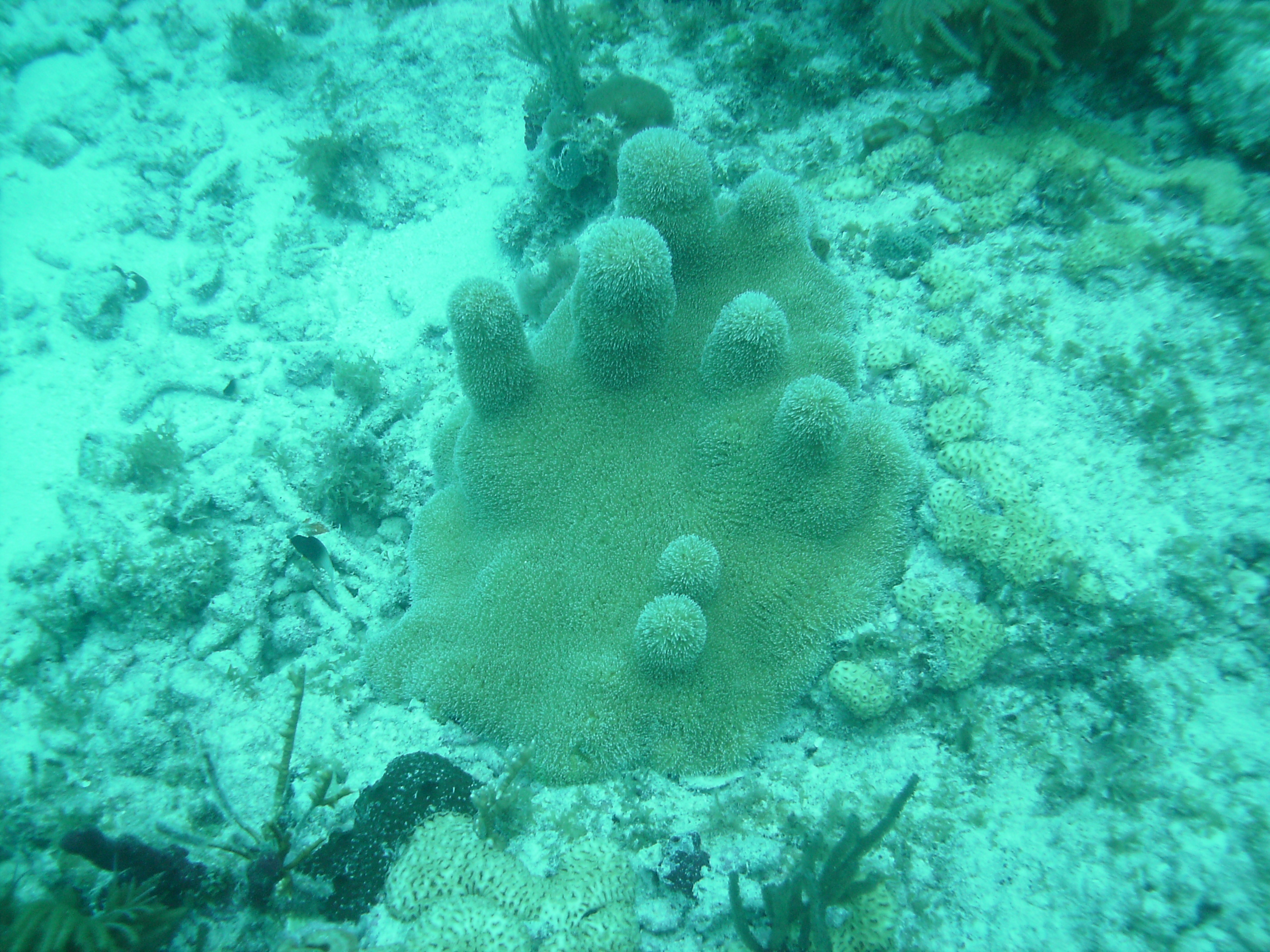
A small colony at Marker 32 reef in the Florida Keys, June 2010

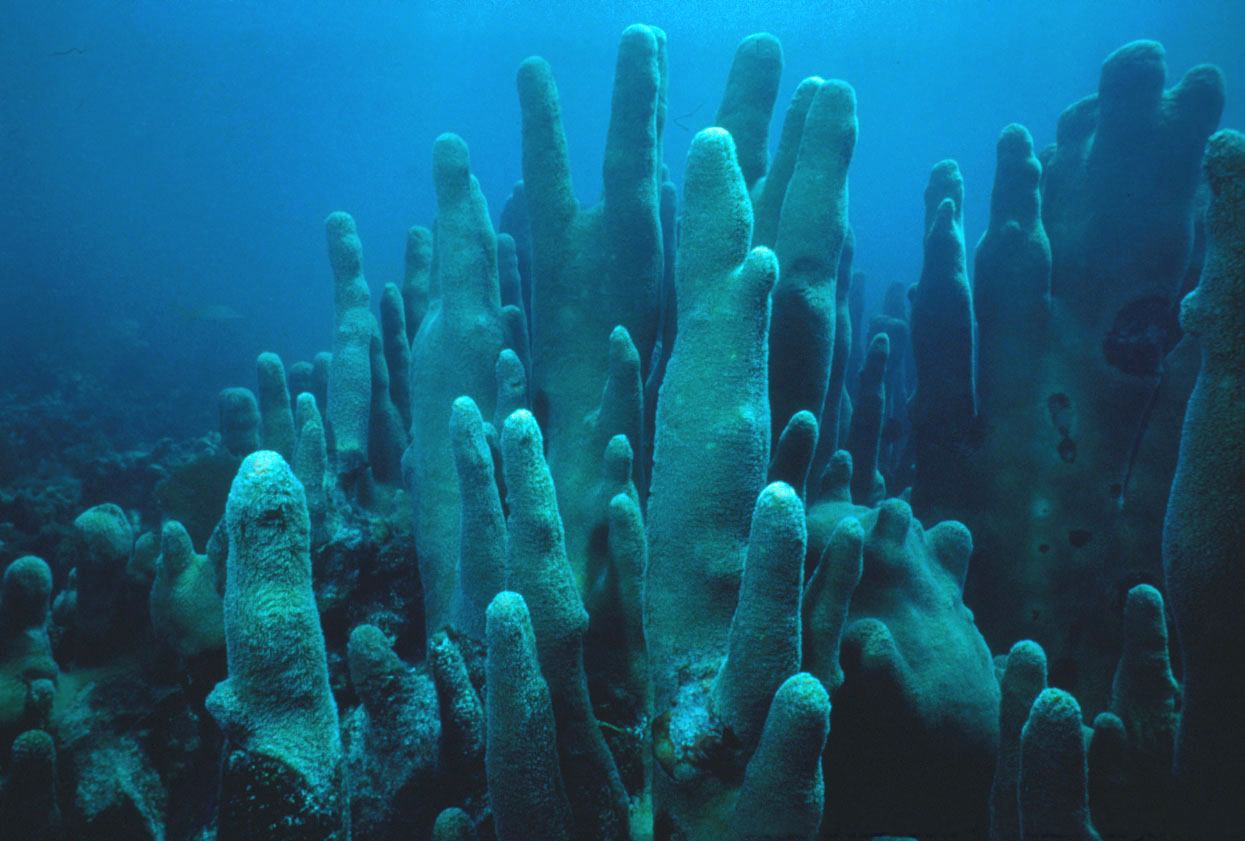
A large colony

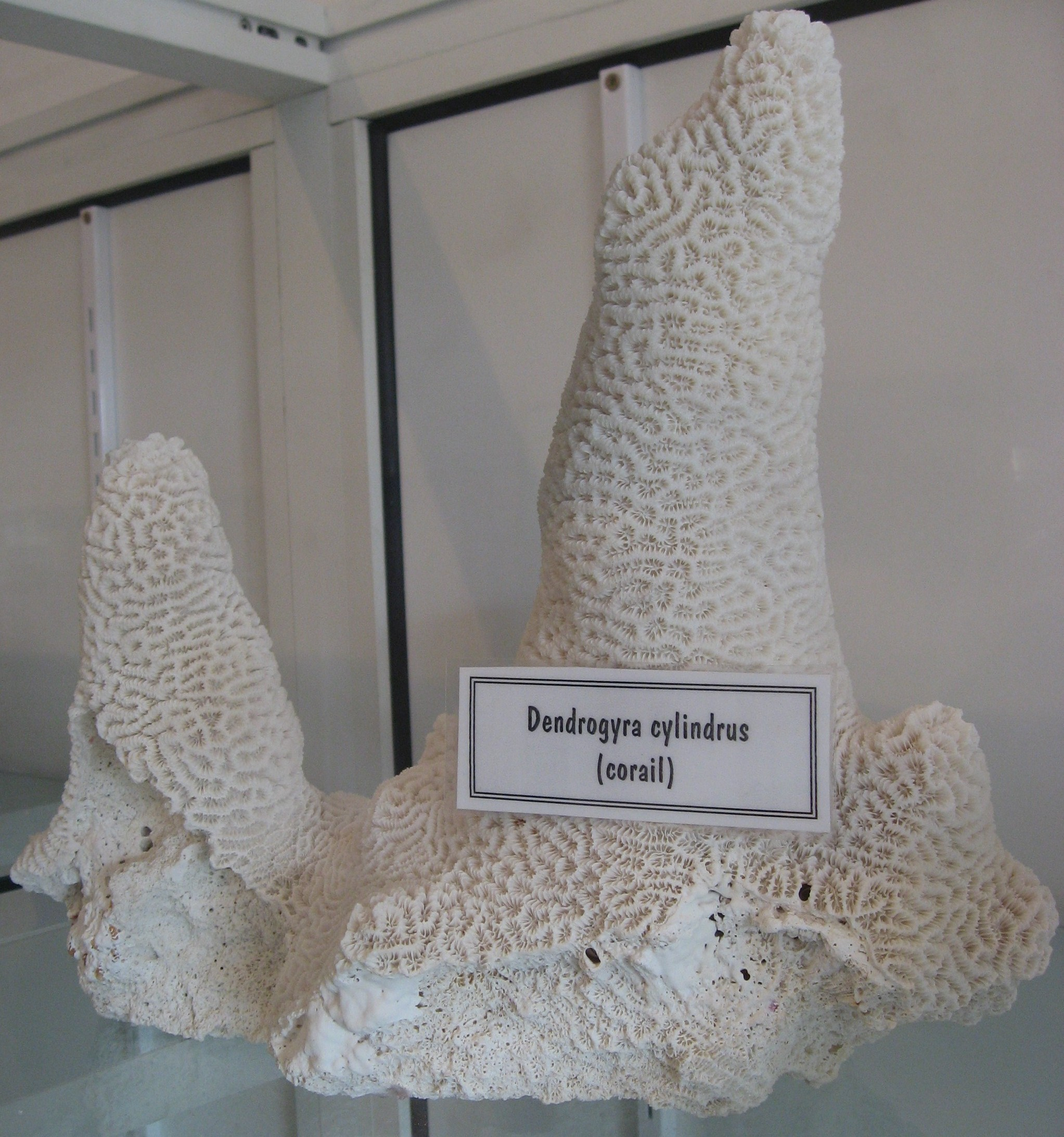
A skeletal specimen from Fort Napoléon, Guadeloupe, December 2006
