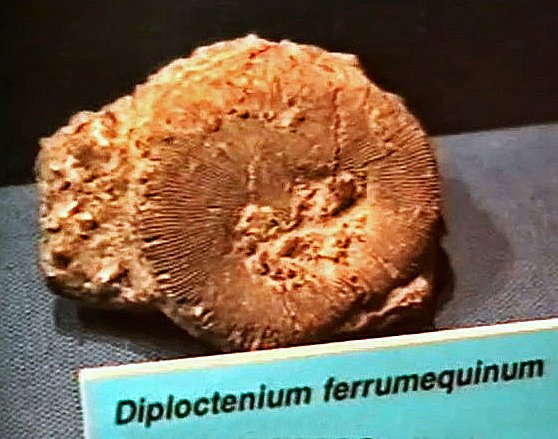
- Fossil of Diploctenium ferrumequinum. Salzburg, Haus der Natur

Scientific classification
- Domain: Eukaryota
- Kingdom: Animalia
- Phylum: Cnidaria
- Subphylum: Anthozoa
- Class: Hexacorallia
- Order: Scleractinia
- Family: Meandrinidae
- Genus: †Diploctenium; Goldfuss 1827

= Diploctenium =

Diploctenium Temporal range: Cretaceous - Paleocene

Extinct genus of corals

Diploctenium is an extinct genus of stony corals belonging to the family Meandrinidae.

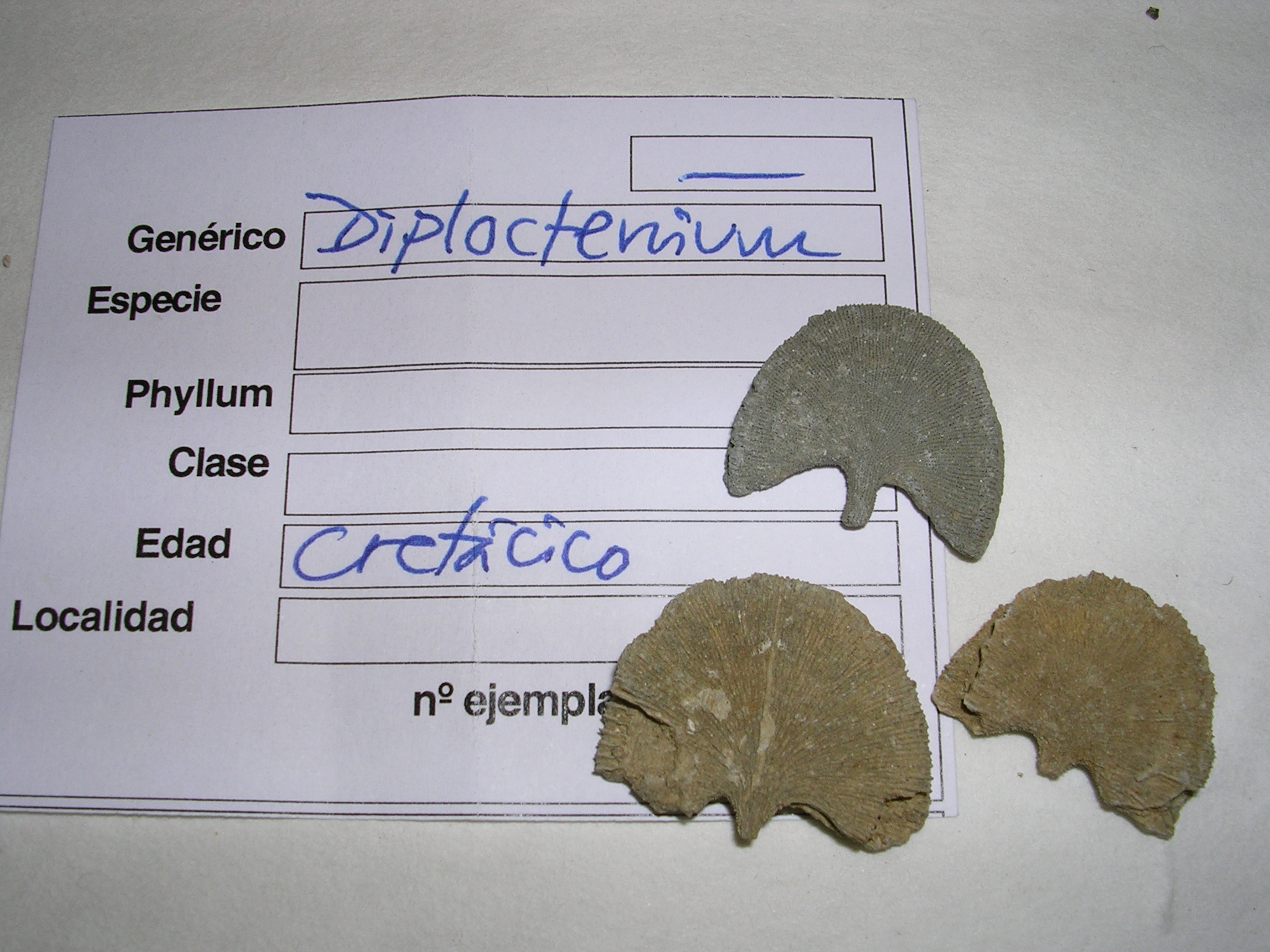
Fossils of Diploctenium species

== Fossil record ==
This genus is known in the fossil record from the Cretaceous to the Paleocene (from about 89.3 to 61.7 million years ago). Fossils of species within this genus can be found in Austria, Croatia, France, Georgia, the Netherlands, Oman, Spain and in the United Arab Emirates.

== Species ==
Species within this genus include:

- Diploctenium affine †
- Diploctenium arnaudi †
- Diploctenium corbariensis †
- Diploctenium cordatum †
- Diploctenium crassicostatum†
- Diploctenium cureti †
- Diploctenium enigma †
- Diploctenium epagnacensis †
- Diploctenium ferrumequinum †
- Diploctenium gracile †
- Diploctenium Jacobi †
- Diploctenium lamellosum †
- Diploctenium lunatum †
- Diploctenium lutaudi †
- Diploctenium matheroni †
- Diploctenium mixtum †
- Diploctenium parvum †
- Diploctenium petrocoriensis †
- Diploctenium plumum †
- Diploctenium provincialis †
- Diploctenium simplex †
- Diploctenium subcirculare †
- Diploctenium toucasi †
- Diploctenium uxacalcensis †
