= Eastern Sambo =

Coral reef in the Florida Keys, US

- Location within Florida Location within the Caribbean

Location
- Location: Caribbean
- Coordinates: 24.494°N 81.663°W
- Country: United States

Geology
- Type: reef

Eastern Sambo is a coral reef located within the Florida Keys National Marine Sanctuary. It lies to the south of Boca Chica Key. It is designated "Research Only".

== See also ==
- Western Sambo
