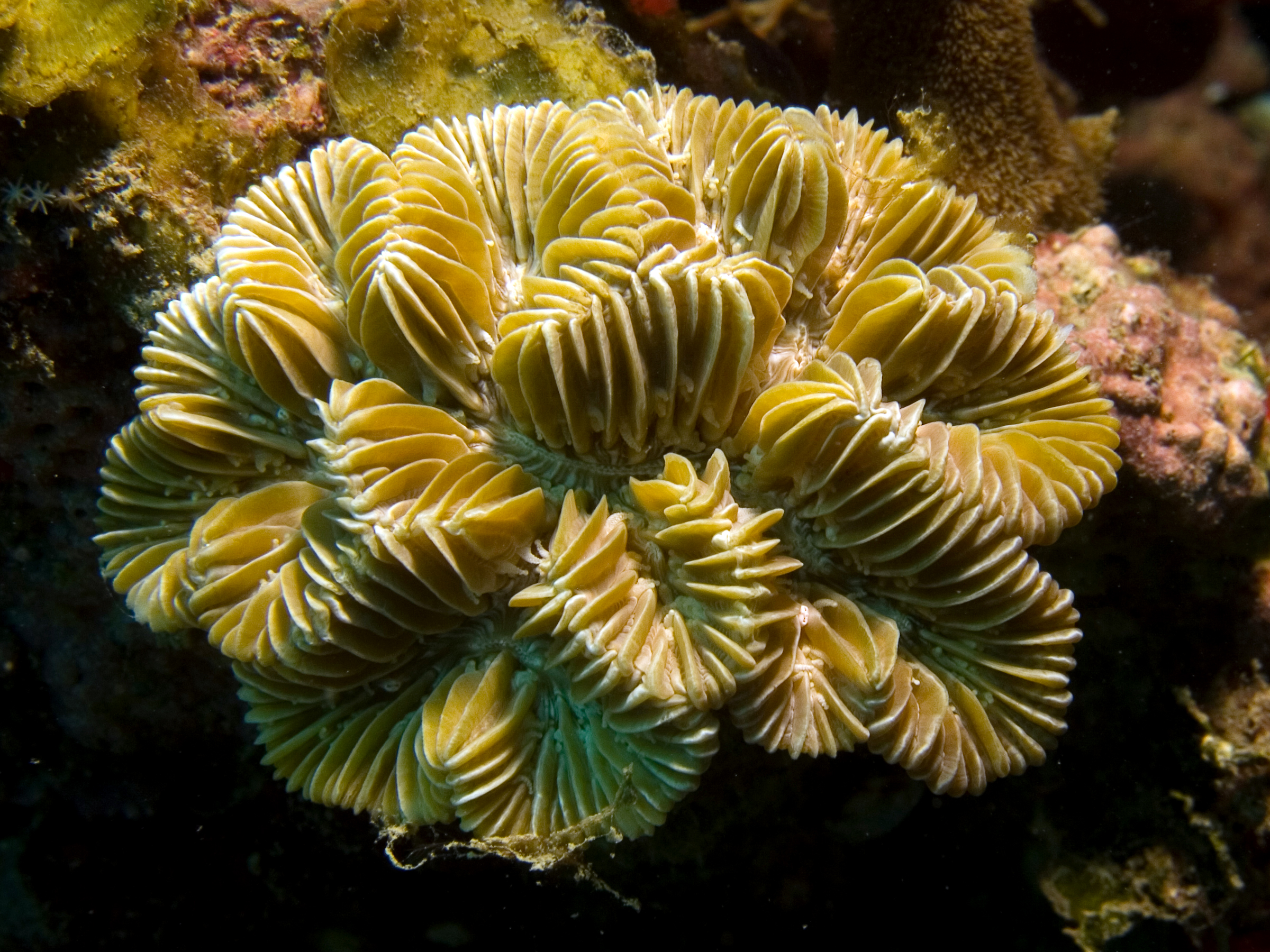
- Small clump of Meandrina meandrites

Scientific classification
- Kingdom: Animalia
- Phylum: Cnidaria
- Subphylum: Anthozoa
- Class: Hexacorallia
- Order: Scleractinia
- Family: Meandrinidae
- Genus: Meandrina; Lamarck, 1801

Species
- See text

Synonyms
- List: Ctenophyllia Dana, 1846; Goreaugyra Wells, 1973; Maeandra Oken, 1815; Maeandrina Dana, 1846; Meandra Oken, 1815

= Meandrina =

Genus of cnidarians

Meandrina is a genus of colonial stony coral in the family Meandrinidae. Corals in this genus form massive hemispherical heads or have large flat plates and can grow to a metre (yard) across. Sometimes it is referred to as brain coral.

== Species ==
The World Register of Marine Species lists the following species:

- Meandrina brasiliensis (Milne Edwards & Haime, 1848)
- Meandrina danae (Milne Edwards & Haime, 1848)
- Meandrina jacksoni Weil & Pinzón, 2011
- Meandrina meandrites (Linnaeus, 1758)
- †Meandrina polygonalis Catullo, 1856
