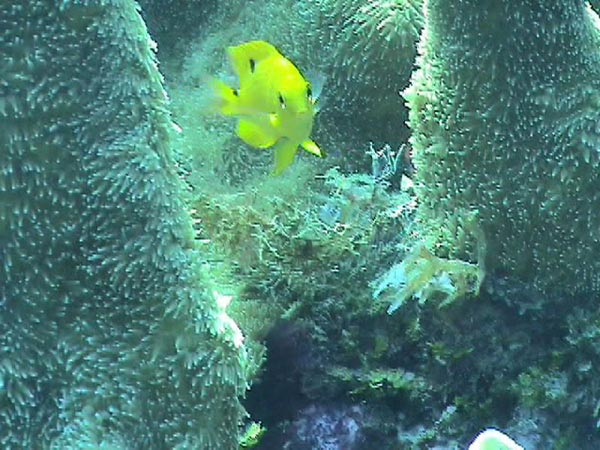
- Threespot damselfish (Stegastes planifrons) among Dendrogyra cylindrus corals

Scientific classification
- Kingdom: Animalia
- Phylum: Cnidaria
- Subphylum: Anthozoa
- Class: Hexacorallia
- Order: Scleractinia
- Suborder: Faviina
- Family: Meandrinidae; Gray, 1847

Genera
- See text

= Meandrinidae =

Family of corals

The Meandrinidae are a family of stony corals. The name comes from the Greek, maiandros meaning "meandering", referring to the miniature, winding valleys found between the corallites. Fossil corals in this family have been found dating back to the Cretaceous.

== Description ==
The Meandrinidae are colonial corals and form part of the reef- building community. They contain zooxanthellae, microscopic algae symbionts that provide them with energy. They occur in various different shapes, including massive, encrusting, columnar, and phaceloid (with tubular corallites united at the base). Although superficially resembling members of the family Faviidae, the corallites of meandrinids have solid, nonporous walls and evenly spaced, solid septa. Most of the genera are found only in the Atlantic Ocean.

== Genera ==
The World Register of Marine Species includes these genera in the family:

- †Aulosmilia Alloiteau, 1952
- †Dasmiopsis Oppenheim, 1930
- Dendrogyra Ehrenberg, 1834
- Dichocoenia Milne Edwards & Haime, 1848
- †Diploctenium Goldfuss, 1826
- †Eugyriopsis L Beauvais, 1976
- Eusmilia Milne Edwards & Haime, 1848
- †Flabellosmilia Oppenheim, 1930
- †Glenarea Počta, 1887
- †Grumiphyllia Wells, 1937
- †Ixogyra Eliášová, 1974
- Meandrina Lamarck, 1801
- †Nefophyllia Wells, 1937
- †Pachygyra Milne Edwards & Haime, 1849
- †Phragmosmilia Alloiteau, 1952
- †Phyllosmilia de Fromentel, 1862
- †Progyrosmilia Wells, 1937
- †Rennensismilia Alloiteau, 1952
- †Scalariogyra Gerth, 1923
- †Strotogyra Wells, 1937
- †Taxogyra Wells, 1937
