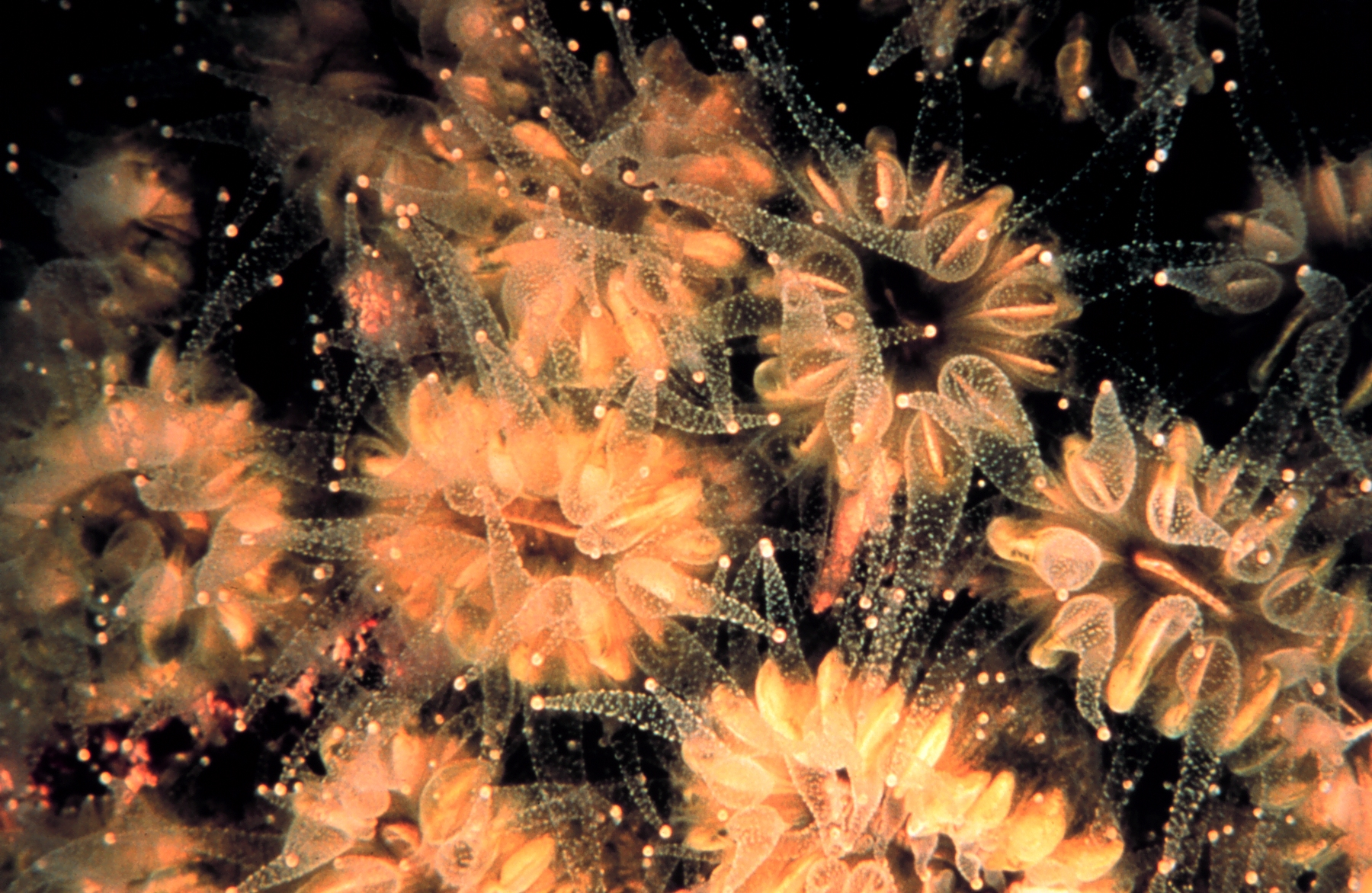

Conservation status
- Critically Endangered (IUCN 3.1)

- Apparently Secure (NatureServe)

Scientific classification
- Kingdom: Animalia
- Phylum: Cnidaria
- Subphylum: Anthozoa
- Class: Hexacorallia
- Order: Scleractinia
- Family: Meandrinidae
- Genus: Eusmilia; Milne Edwards & Haime, 1848
- Species: E. fastigiata

Binomial name
- Eusmilia fastigiata (Pallas, 1766)

Synonyms
- (Species): Madrepora fastigiata Pallas, 1766

= Eusmilia =

Genus of corals

Eusmilia is a genus of stony coral in the family Meandrinidae. It is a monotypic genus represented by the species Eusmilia fastigiata, commonly known as the smooth flower coral. It is found on reefs in the Caribbean Sea.

== Description ==
Smooth flower coral is a colonial species that grows to about 50 centimetres (20 in) across. It forms a low mound of stony calcium carbonate, the surface of which is covered with tubular projections, the corallites, in groups of one to three. The polyps protrude from these and are either round or oval, with the oval form being more common at moderate depths. They are large and widely spaced and are connected by a layer of translucent, jelly-like mesoglea tissue called coenosarc which covers the surface of the carbonate skeleton. During the day they are retracted back into the cup-shaped corallites. These have large smooth-edged ridges called septa, and the polyps have corresponding grooves at their base. At night, the polyps stretch out their translucent white tentacles to feed and the coral "flowers". This coral is usually cream, yellow or pale brown, often with a green or pink tinge.

== Distribution and habitat ==
Smooth flower coral is found in the Caribbean, the Gulf of Mexico, the Bahamas and southern Florida, at depths down to about 60 metres (200 ft) though it is commonest between 5 and 30 metres (16 and 98 ft). It is found on both the back and the front edges of reefs and is sometimes overhung by larger corals. It is listed as being critically endangered by the IUCN Red List of Threatened Species

== Biology ==
The polyps remain retracted in the skeleton during the day but extend at night to feed. The tentacles search for zooplankton and small invertebrates which are transferred to the mouth. Another major source of energy is the result of the symbiotic dinoflagellates which live within the coenenchyme and which produce nutrients by photosynthesis. The coral benefits from the carbohydrates produced and the algae use the coral's nitrogenous waste products.

== Reproduction ==
Reproduction in corals takes place when gametes are released into the water. The fertilized egg develops into a planula larva which forms part of the zooplankton and drifts with the current. After passing through a number of larval stages this settles on the sea bed and undergoes metamorphosis into a polyp. The base of this secretes the calcium carbonate skeleton and the polyp founds a new colony, producing new polyps by budding.
