= Western Sambo =

Coral reef in the Florida Keys, US

- Location within Florida Location within the Caribbean

Location
- Location: Caribbean
- Coordinates: 24°28′40″N 81°42′48″W
- Country: United States

Geology
- Type: reef

Western Sambo is a coral reef located within the Florida Keys National Marine Sanctuary. It lies to the south of Boca Chica Key, within Western Sambos Ecological Reserve. The reef itself lies along the southern edge of the reserve boundary.

== See also ==
- Eastern Sambo
