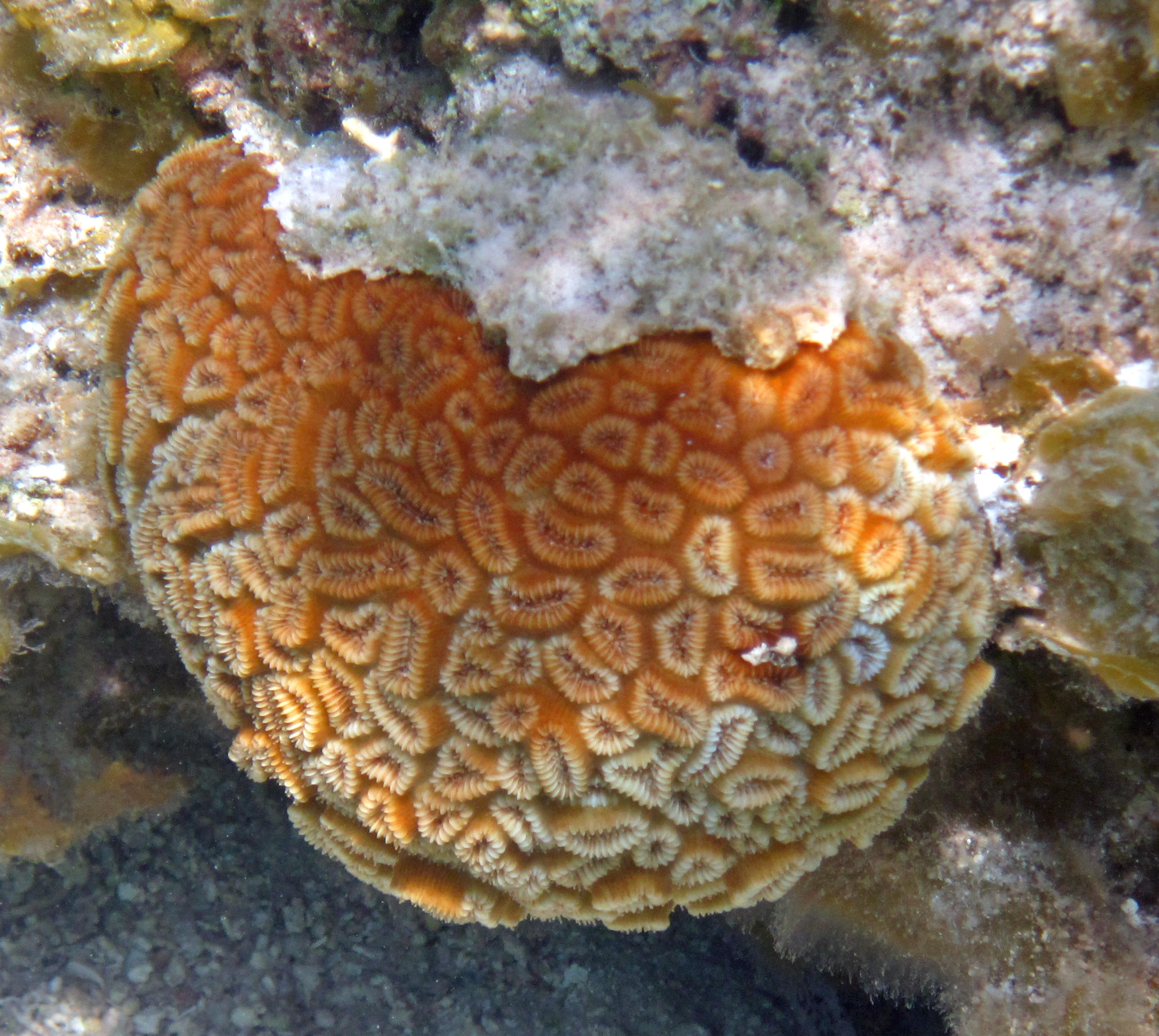

Conservation status
- Vulnerable (IUCN 3.1)

- Vulnerable (NatureServe)

Scientific classification
- Kingdom: Animalia
- Phylum: Cnidaria
- Subphylum: Anthozoa
- Class: Hexacorallia
- Order: Scleractinia
- Family: Meandrinidae
- Genus: Dichocoenia; Milne Edwards & Haime, 1848
- Species: D. stokesi

Binomial name
- Dichocoenia stokesi Milne Edwards & Haime, 1848

Synonyms
- List (Genus): Parastrea Milne-Edwards & Haime, 1849; (Species): Astrea porcata Lamarck, 1816; Dichocoenia stellaris Milne Edwards & Haime, 1848; Dichocoenia stokesi Milne Edwards & Haime, 1848 [lapsus]

= Dichocoenia =

Genus of corals

Dichocoenia is a monotypic genus of stony coral in the family Meandrinidae. It is represented by a single species, Dichocoenia stokesii, which is commonly known as pineapple coral, elliptical star coral, or pancake star coral. It is mostly found in the Caribbean Sea and the western Atlantic Ocean. Dichocoenia stokesii has irregular calyces and its form can be either a massive, hemispherical hump or a flat, platform-like structure.

== Description ==
Dichocoenia stokesi is a massive colonial coral that forms rounded humps up to 40 centimetres (16 in) in diameter or thick plates. It is recognisable by the fact that many of the corallites, the stony cups from which the coral polyps protrude, can be oval, or elongated. They can be up to 5 centimetres (2.0 in) long and only 0.5 centimetres (0.20 in) wide. Others are circular or Y-shaped and all have raised rims. The columella, the central axial structure in the corallite, is fragile and spongy. The polyps are large and well-separated with a diameter of about 4 millimetres (0.16 in). The colour is variable and can be white, cream, orange, yellowish-brown, green, olive or brown and the septo-costae, the little ridges that surround the corallites, are white. Sometimes two individual corals grow side by side and intertwine, forming one hump, but in these circumstances they do not fuse and each retains its original colour.

== Distribution and habitat ==
Dichocoenia stokesi is found in the western Atlantic Ocean and Caribbean Sea. Its range extends from Bermuda and southern Florida to the southern half of the Gulf of Mexico and along the coast of Central America to Venezuela. The fossil record shows that this species grew in the Caribbean region as long ago as the Oligocene Era (34 to 23 million years ago). It is a relatively uncommon species and tends to grow on fore reefs and back reefs but not on reef crests. It has a wide depth range of 2 to 72 metres (6 to 236 feet) but is commonest at 30 metres (98 ft) or less. The corallites are larger and more prominent in individuals growing at greater depths.

== Biology ==
Dichocoenia stokesi is a zooxanthellate coral. Single celled symbiotic green algae live within the tissues. These use the coral's nitrogenous waste and supply the coral with the organic products of photosynthesis. During the day, the coral's polyps are retracted but at night they emerge and the tentacles are extended to catch plankton and small invertebrates. This coral is not much affected by predation but is eaten by some bivalve molluscs and is sometimes overgrown by sponges.

The sexes are separate in Dichocoenia stokesi. There seem to be two mass spawning events during the year, one at the end of August and the other in October. The free-swimming planula larvae eventually settle on the seabed and develop into juvenile polyps which found new colonies.

== Status ==
Although Dichocoenia stokesi is susceptible to bleaching, it is considerably more tolerant of thermal stress than many other stony coral species. It is very susceptible to the disease white plague, especially at high water temperatures. In the Florida Keys in 1995 there was an epizootic of white plague type II and 75% of Dichocoenia stokesi colonies were killed. Because of its slow growth rate and low level of recruitment, recovery after this outbreak did not occur and the reef population seems to be permanently diminished. Dichocoenia stokesi is also susceptible to black band disease, ciliate infection and dark-spot syndrome.
